= List of parliamentary constituencies of Bermuda =

The House of Assembly is the lower house of the Parliament of Bermuda, a British Overseas Territory, and comprises 36 members elected in single-seat constituencies using first-past-the-post voting. The members serve five-year terms. The last general election was held on the 18 February 2025, and resulted in a Progressive Labour Party (PLP) majority government, with the PLP representing 25 constituencies, and the One Bermuda Alliance (OBA) representing 11. The current bicameral parliament was established by the Bermuda Constitution Order 1968, and was amended most recently by the Constitution of Bermuda (Constituency Boundaries} Order 2010 at the advice of the Boundaries Commission.

== Constituencies ==
† Progressive Labour Party (PLP) ‡ One Bermuda Alliance (OBA) § Free Democratic Movement (FDM) ¶ Independent

No.	Constituency	Registered voters (2025)	Majority	Member of Parliament	Nearest opposition	Parish
01	St. George's North	1,253	240	Renee Anderson Ming †	James 'Smokey' Perry ‡	St. George's
02	St. George's West	1,306	155	Hubert Kim Eugene Swan †	Thomas Harvey ‡	St. George's
03	St. David's	1,365	274	Lovitta Foggo †	Maurice Foley ‡	St. George's
04	St. George's South	1,360	246	Tinee Furbert †	Clifton Lambert ‡	St. George's
05	Hamilton East	1,365	327	Leroy G.W. Bean †	Lateef Trott ‡	Hamilton
06	Hamilton West	1,294	243	Wayne Livingston Furbert †	Joseph Nester Marable ‡	Hamilton
07	Hamilton South	1,290	69	Robin Tucker ‡	H. Anthony Richardson †	Hamilton
08	Smith's South	1,333	410	Benjamin Smith ‡	Lauren Bell †	Smith's
09	Smith's West	1,293	97	Vance Campbell ‡	Shomari Talbot-Woolridge †	Smith's
10	Smith's North	1,305	17	Robert King ‡	Lindsay Simmons †	Smith's
11	Devonshire East	1,222	148	Thomas Christopher Famous †	Geoffrey Hart Faiella ‡	Devonshire
12	Devonshire South Central	1,312	421	Craig Cannonier ‡	Andre Q. Famous †	Devonshire
13	Devonshire North Central	1,149	188	Diallo Rabain †	Renee Turini Webb ¶	Devonshire
14	Devonshire North West	1,164	96	Alexa Noelle Herbert Lightbourne †	David Henri Rogers ‡	Devonshire
15	Pembroke East	1,143	338	Owen K. Darrell †	Malachi Troy Symonds ‡	Pembroke
16	Pembroke East Central	1,137	390	Michael Anthony Weeks †	Shermaine Riley-Murphy §	Pembroke
17	Pembroke Central	1,121	162	Jason Hayward †	Sophia Marie Cannonier ‡	Pembroke
18	Pembroke West Central	1,190	304	David Burt †	Nicky Gurret ‡	Pembroke
19	Pembroke West	1,199	79	Jache Adams †	Marcus Jones ‡	Pembroke
20	Pembroke South West	1,080	316	Michael M. Fahy ‡	Iesha T. Musson †	Pembroke
21	Pembroke South East	1,150	208	Curtis L. Dickinson †	Sophia Tessitore ‡	Pembroke
22	Paget East	1,395	346	Scott Pearman ‡	J. Dawn Simmons †	Paget
23	Paget West	1,246	262	Jarion Richardson ‡	Kim Wilkerson †	Paget
24	Warwick South East	1,244	84	Lawrence Scott †	Tarik J.D. Smith ‡	Warwick
25	Warwick North East	1,325	294	Douglas DeCouto ‡	Joanne Ball-Burgess †	Warwick
26	Warwick South Central	1,279	366	Neville Sinclair Tyrrell †	Montell Hugh Currin ‡	Warwick
27	Warwick North Central	1,209	199	Paul Gordon Edwin Wilmot †	Dion Earlston Smith ‡	Warwick
28	Warwick West	1,299	30	Dennis J.R. Lister †	Victoria Cunningham ‡	Warwick
29	Southampton East	1,209	318	Zane De Silva †	Deon Smith ‡	Southampton
30	Southampton East Central	1,342	168	Dwayne Vernell Robinson ‡	Mischa Gandhi Fubler †	Southampton
31	Southampton West Central	1,302	19	Linda Smith ‡	Crystal Caesar †	Southampton
32	Southampton West	1,234	97	Scott Arthur Simmons †	Marc Bean §	Southampton
33	Sandys South	1,269	223	Jamahl Snaith Simmons †	Michael Swan ‡	Sandys
34	Sandys South Central	1,241	310	Kim N Wilson †	Steven Faries ¶	Sandys
35	Sandys North Central	1,214	178	Dennis Lister †	Christopher Bean ¶	Sandys
36	Sandys North	1,225	69	Rev. Dr. Emily Gail Dill †	Cire Bean ¶	Sandys

== See also ==
- Parliament of Bermuda
- House of Assembly of Bermuda
- Elections in Bermuda
