= Kim Swan =

Bermudian politician

The Honourable H. Kim E. Swan JP, MP

Member of Parliament
- Incumbent
- Assumed office July 2017 to present
- Preceded by: Nandi Davis (OBA)
- Succeeded by: Kim Swan (PLP)
- Constituency: St. George's West
- Majority: 330 votes (65.71%)

10th Leader of the Opposition
- In office 21 January 2008 – 16 May 2011
- Premier: Paula Cox
- Preceded by: Michael Dunkley
- Succeeded by: John Barritt

Personal details
- Born: 4 October 1957 (age 69) Bermuda
- Party: Progressive Labour Party
- Education: Troy University

Hubert "Kim" E. Swan (born 4 October 1957) is a Bermudian professional golfer and politician. He was reelected for the Progressive Labour Party (PLP) in July 2017. He was a member of parliament from 2007 to 2012, where he was Leader of the Opposition of Bermuda from 21 January 2008 until 16 May 2011. He also served as a UBP Senator from 1998 to 2007.

== Early life ==
Swan is the eldest son of working-class parents, Hubert E. E. Swan (a career police officer) and Barbara Swan of Southampton. He spent many of his formative years with his maternal grandparents, John and Ivy Anderson. Through his paternal grandfather, Swan is a 6th-generation descendant of Charles Roach Ratteray (1799–1872), a renowned ship builder, entrepreneur and pioneer of the AME Church in Bermuda..

Swan attended Southampton Glebe, Berkeley Institute and Warwick Secondary Schools in Bermuda before receiving his tertiary education at Palm Beach Junior College (now Palm Beach State College) in Lake Worth, Florida. He received a Bachelor of Science degree from Troy State University in Troy, Alabama in 1980.

== Golf career ==
Swan learned the game of golf from his uncle, Herman Santucci Bascome, a former golf pro at Ocean View Golf Course in Bermuda, while growing up at the newly developed government-owned Port Royal Golf Course in the early 1970s. He was a member of the then Palm Beach Junior College golf team led by Ken Green, which finished 4th in the State Junior College Championship in 1978, before joining Troy State University golf team. Individually, he won medalist honours at the Northeast Louisiana University Invitational at Chenault Park Municipal Golf Course in Monroe, Louisiana. He played under legendary golf coach Mike Griffin at Troy. He led the Troy team that placed 4th in the 1979 NCAA Division II Golf Championship at El Macero Country Club in Davis, California, and was named Troy's MVP in 1979.

As an amateur golfer, Swan also participated in major amateur events including the 1974 Orange Bowl Junior Championship in Miami, Florida, and two World Amateur Team Championships (for the Eisenhower Trophy) in 1978 in Fiji and 1980 in the United States.

Swan turned professional in 1980, qualified for the European Tour in 1980, and competed for two years. He partnered with fellow Bermudian Keith Smith to qualify for the 1984, and for three Bermuda Open Golf Championships. He also partnered with Dwayne Pearman in the 1993 World Cup of Golf.

Since 2012, Swan has been the teaching golf pro at Port Royal Golf Course. As an independent contractor, he created the Port Royal Golf Developmental Program for new golfers.

== Political career ==
Initially, Swan contested four general elections over 25 years before winning a seat in the House of Assembly of Bermuda in December 2007. He served in the Senate of Bermuda as a UBP nominee for 9 years (1998–2007), became Opposition Senate Leader in 2001, and served as Senate Leader under four Opposition Leaders, until his election to the Bermuda House of Assembly at the 2007 election. He became party leader, and on 21 January 2008 became Leader of the Opposition, a position he held until 16 May 2011.

UBP was in merger negotiations with the Bermuda Democratic Alliance; and, following the Central Council's 3 May 2011 vote to disband the UBP, several general members of UBP expressed concern that there was no special general meeting on the issue in any of the party's 36 branches. Swan and others petitioned the party executive to hold a public meeting, but their pleas were ignored. When he and the others attempted to convene a dispute tribunal under Section 13 of the UBP constitution, they were also ignored. On 10 May 2011, Swan, three other former party chairmen and others successfully filed a court injunction preventing UBP from disbanding.

On 15 May 2011, seven of the nine UBP members resigned and joined the Bermuda Democratic Alliance; and on 16 May, Swan notified the governor of his resignation as Leader of the Opposition. Swan and the others dropped their injunction, permitting the UBP executive to settle its affairs. However, Swan continued to sit in the House of Assembly and said he planned to rebuild the party. When the House of Assembly was dissolved for the 17 December 2012 election, he ran as an independent. He finished third, receiving 23% of the vote behind 39% for the new One Bermuda Alliance, only narrowly besting 38% for the Progressive Labour Party candidate. It was the only constituency where the winner received less than 40% of the vote.

In 2014, Swan accepted an invitation from Leader of the Opposition Marc Bean to join the Progressive Labour Party.
