= Leader of the Opposition (Bermuda) =

- Incumbent; The Hon. N. H. Cole Simons JP, MP since 2 November 2020
- Style: The Honourable
- Term length: While leader of the largest political party in the House of Assembly that is not in government

The Leader of the Opposition (officially the Leader of His Majesty's Opposition in Bermuda or Leader of Her Majesty's Opposition in Bermuda when the monarch is female) is the leader of the largest political party in the House of Assembly that is not in government. The Leader of the Opposition is seen as an alternate Premier-in-waiting and leads Bermuda's Opposition and Shadow Cabinet.

The current holder of the post of Leader of the Opposition is Jarion Richardson.

== List of leaders of the opposition of Bermuda ==
#	Incumbent	Portrait	Tenure		Political party
#	Incumbent	Portrait	Took office	Left office	Political party
1	Arnold Francis		February 1963	1966	Progressive Labour Party
2	Walter Robinson		1966	May 1968	Progressive Labour Party
3	Lois Browne-Evans		22 May 1968	June 1972	Progressive Labour Party
(2)	Walter Robinson		June 1972	April 1976	Progressive Labour Party
(3)	Lois Browne-Evans		April 1976	October 1985	Progressive Labour Party
4	L. Frederick Wade		November 1985	13 August 1996	Progressive Labour Party
Acting	Jennifer Smith		13 August 1996	20 August 1996	Progressive Labour Party
5	Jennifer Smith		20 August 1996	9 December 1998	Progressive Labour Party
6	Pamela Gordon		9 December 1998	October 2001	United Bermuda Party
7	Grant Gibbons		October 2001	January 2006	United Bermuda Party
8	Wayne Furbert		January 2006	3 April 2007	United Bermuda Party
9	Michael Dunkley		3 April 2007	18 December 2007	United Bermuda Party
10	Kim Swan		18 December 2007	17 May 2011	United Bermuda Party
11	John Barritt		17 May 2011	15 September 2011	One Bermuda Alliance
12	Craig Cannonier		15 September 2011	17 December 2012	One Bermuda Alliance
Acting	Derrick Burgess		17 December 2012	21 December 2012	Progressive Labour Party
13	Marc Bean		21 December 2012	4 November 2016	Progressive Labour Party
Acting	Edward David Burt		4 November 2016	7 November 2016	Progressive Labour Party
14	Edward David Burt		7 November 2016	18 July 2017	Progressive Labour Party
15	Patricia Gordon-Pamplin		26 July 2017	21 November 2017	One Bermuda Alliance
16	Jeanne Atherden		21 November 2017	20 September 2018	One Bermuda Alliance
17	Craig Cannonier		24 September 2018	October 2020	One Bermuda Alliance
18	N.H. Cole Simons		2 November 2020	August 2023	One Bermuda Alliance
19	Jarion Richardson		August 2023	September 2025	One Bermuda Alliance
