= 2020 Bermudian general election =

- 1 October 2020

All 36 seats in the House of Assembly 19 seats needed for a majority
- Registered: 42,638
- Turnout: 60.93% (▼12.05pp)
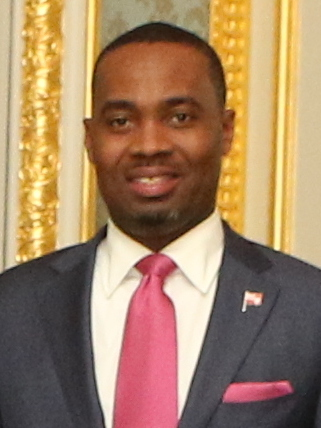

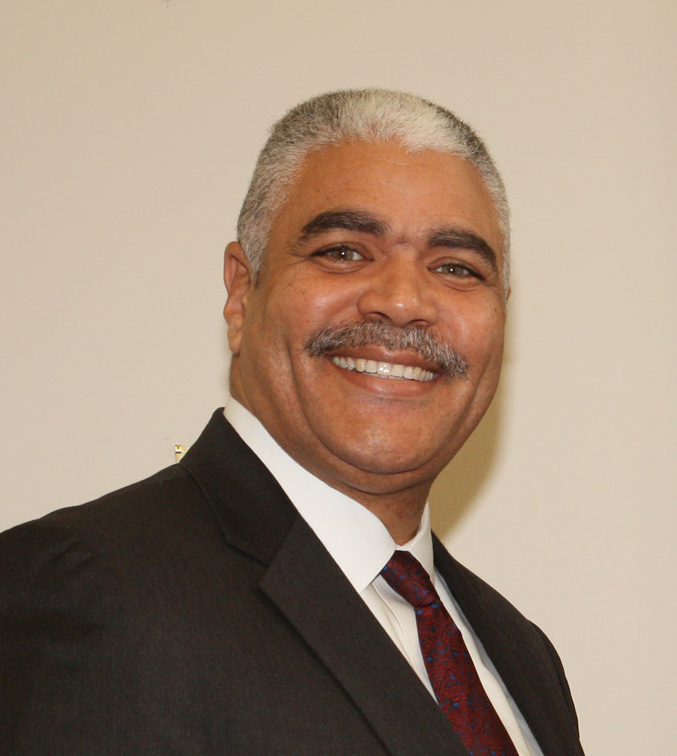
	First party	Second party
Leader	Edward David Burt	Craig Cannonier
Party	PLP	OBA
Last election	58.89%, 24 seats	40.61%, 12 seats
Seats won	30	6
Seat change	▲6	▼6
Popular vote	15,995	8,314
Percentage	62.09%	32.27%
Swing	▲3.10pp	▼8.34pp
- Results by constituency
Premier before election
Edward David Burt
PLP
Elected Premier
Edward David Burt
PLP

General elections were held in Bermuda on 1 October 2020 to elect all 36 members of the House of Assembly. On 21 August 2020 Premier Edward David Burt announced that Governor of Bermuda John Rankin has accepted his advice to call a snap election. The election resulted in the largest victory for one party since party politics began in Bermuda in 1968, as the Progressive Labour Party won 62% of the vote and 30 of 36 seats (including 3 seats where they ran unopposed).

== Electoral system ==
The 36 members of the House of Assembly are elected from single-member constituencies by first-past-the-post voting.

== Contesting parties ==
Party	Position	Ideology	Leader (since)	Last election	At dissolution	Contested
Progressive Labour Party	Centre-left	Social conservatism Social democracy Anti-colonialism	Edward David Burt (December 2016)	24 / 36 (67%)	25 / 36 (69%)	36 / 36 (100%)
One Bermuda Alliance	Centre-right	Liberal conservatism	Craig Cannonier (October 2018)	12 / 36 (33%)	10 / 36 (28%)	31 / 36 (86%)
Free Democratic Movement	Centre-right	Conservative liberalism Subsidiarity	Marc Bean (September 2020)	0 / 36 (0%)	0 / 36 (0%)	14 / 36 (39%)

== Incumbent MPs not seeking re-election ==
Retiring incumbent		Electoral District	Term in office	Reason	Date announced	Replaced as MP by
Trevor Moniz	OBA	Constituency Nine/Smith's West	1993-2020	Not standing	3 August 2020	
Rolfe Commissiong	PLP	Constituency 21/Pembroke South East	2012–2020	Not standing	28 August 2020	

== Candidates by Parish ==
The announced candidates are presented below, along with the incumbent candidates before the election. MPs who are not standing for re-election are marked (†). Government ministers and speakers are in bold, and party leaders are in italics.

=== St. George's Parish and St. David's Island ===
Electoral District	Candidates			Incumbent
Electoral District	PLP	OBA	**FDM**	Incumbent
Constituency One/St. George's North	Renee Ming	James Perry		**Renee Ming**
Constituency Two/St. George's West	Kim Swan	Thomas Harvey	Dwain Smith	Kim Swan
Constituency Three/St. Davids	Lovitta Foggo	Antoine Cannonier		**Lovitta Foggo**
Constituency Four/St. George's South	Tinée Furbert	Kimberlee Pitcher		Tinée Furbert

=== Hamilton Parish ===
Electoral District	Candidates			Incumbent
Electoral District	PLP	OBA	**FDM**	Incumbent
Electoral District Five/Hamilton East	Derrick Burgess	Elizabeth Harvey	Desmond Crockwell	**Derrick Burgess**
Electoral District Six/Hamilton West	Wayne Furbert	Simone Barton		**Wayne Furbert**
Electoral District Seven/Hamilton South	Anthony Richardson	Robin Tucker	Cheryl Packwood	Sylvan Richards Jr.

=== Smith's Parish ===
Electoral District	Candidates		Incumbent
Electoral District	PLP	OBA	Incumbent
Constituency Eight/Smith's South	Owen Darrell	Cole Simons	N. Cole Simons
Constituency Nine/Smith's West	Vance Campbell	Vic Ball	Vacant
Constituency Ten/Smith's North	Ernest Peets Jr	Michael Dunkley	Michael Dunkley

=== Devonshire Parish ===
Electoral District	Candidates				Incumbent
Electoral District	PLP	OBA	**FDM**	**Independent**	Incumbent
Constituency 11/Devonshire East	Thomas Christopher Famous	Patricia Gordon-Pamplin			Christopher Famous
Constituency 12/Devonshire South Central	Lindsay Kathleen Simmons	Craig Cannonier	Patrice Minors	Marilyn Louise Steede	Craig Cannonier
Constituency 13/Devonshire North Central	Diallo Rabain	Charles Francis Batson Swan	Leighsa Darrell-Augustus		**Diallo Rabain**
Constituency 14//Devonshire North West	Wayne Caines	Catherine Kempe			Wayne Caines

=== Pembroke Parish ===
Electoral District	Candidates			Incumbent
Electoral District	PLP	OBA	**FDM**	Incumbent
Constituency 15/Pembroke East	Walter Henri Roban	Scott Stewart		**Walter Roban**
Constituency 16/Pembroke East Central	Michael Weeks			Michael Weeks
Constituency 17/Pembroke Central	**Jason Hayward**			**Jason Hayward**
Constituency 18/Pembroke West Central	**Edward David Burt**	Nick Kempe	Enda Matthie	**Edward David Burt**
Constituency 19/Pembroke West	Jache Adams	Marcus Jones	Leyoni Junos	Jeanne Atherden
Constituency 20/Pembroke South West	Davida Marie Morris	Susan Jackson		Susan Jackson
Constituency 21/Pembroke South East	**Curtis Dickinson**		Gavin Smith	Rolfe Commissiong

=== Paget Parish ===
Electoral District	Candidates		Incumbent
Electoral District	PLP	OBA	Incumbent
Constituency 22/Paget East	Curtis Peadel Richardson	Scott Pearman	Scott Pearman
Constituency 23/Paget West	Arianna Jasmin Leigha Hodgson	Jarion Richardson	Patricia Gordon Pamplin

=== Warwick Parish ===
Electoral District	Candidates				Incumbent
Electoral District	PLP	OBA	**FDM**	**Independent**	Incumbent
Constituency 24/Warwick South East	W. Lawrence Scott	Tarik Smith			Lawrence Scott
Constituency 25/Warwick North East	Ianthia Simmons-Wade	Jon Leslie Brunson			**Curtis Dickinson**
Constituency 26/Warwick South Central	**Neville Tyrrell**				**Neville Tyrrell**
Constituency 27/Warwick North Central	David Arnold Burch	Douglas Seraphim James DeCouto	Collingwood Robinson	Antoine Raynor Maria Antoinette Seaman	**David Burch**
Constituency 28/Warwick West	Dennis James Ryan Lister	Dwayne Vernell Robinson			Dennis Lister III

=== Southampton Parish ===
Electoral District	Candidates			Incumbent
Electoral District	PLP	OBA	**FDM**	Incumbent
Constituency 29/Southampton East	Zane DeSilva	DaQuan Jahki Lamel Scott		Zane De Silva
Constituency 30/Southampton East Central	Jason Russell Weathered Wade	Leah Kimberly Scott		Leah Scott
Constituency 31/Southampton West Central	Crystal Camille Caesar	Benjamin Anthony Smith	*	Ben Smith
Constituency 32/Southampton West	Scott Arthur Simmons	Karen Louise Magnum	Christopher Paul Gauntlett	Scott Simmons

- - Kae Thomas Palacio filed as a candidate for the FDM in constituency 31 but withdrew her candidacy and resigned from the FDM before election day.

=== Sandys Parish ===
Electoral District	Candidates				Incumbent
Electoral District	PLP	OBA	**FDM**	**Independent**	Incumbent
Constituency 33/Sandys South	Jamahl Simmons		Christina Eliot Storey		Jamahl Simmons
Constituency 34/Sandys South Central	Kim N. Wilson	Nicky Gurret	Clarence E. Dean		Kim Wilson
Constituency 35/Sandys North Central	Dennis Patrick Lister	Michael Cann	Tiana Pamela Butterfield Saltus		Dennis Lister
Constituency 36/Sandys North	Kathy Lynn Simmons	Jefferson Colby Sousa	Marc Allan Bean		Michael Scott

== Results ==
Party	Votes	%	Seats	+/–
Progressive Labour Party	15,995	62.09	30	+6
One Bermuda Alliance	8,314	32.27	6	–6
Free Democratic Movement	1,384	5.37	0	0
Independents	67	0.26	0	0
Total	25,760	100.00	36	0
Valid votes	25,760	99.15		
Invalid/blank votes	220	0.85		
Total votes	25,980	100.00		
Registered voters/turnout	42,638	60.93		
Source: Parliamentary Registry
