= List of political parties in Bermuda =

This article lists political parties in Bermuda.

Bermuda has a three-party system, which means that there are three political parties: the Progressive Labour Party (PLP), the One Bermuda Alliance (OBA) and the Free Democratic Movement. From 1968 — Bermuda's first party-based election — to 1998, the United Bermuda Party (UBP) controlled Parliament. In 1998, it was supplanted by the slightly older PLP. Most UBP members merged with a breakaway party called the Bermuda Democratic Alliance in 2011 to form the OBA. The PLP and OBA currently hold all of the seats in the House of Assembly and were the only two parties with offices and organizations before September 1, 2020.

Another party, the Bermuda Democratic Party, contested the 1968 election but failed to win any seats and collapsed soon after, eventually to be replaced by the now-defunct National Liberal Party. In addition, several candidates have run as independents, to varying success, or have formed temporary, one-man parties such as the Gombey Liberation Party (or, in its later days, the National Liberal Party).

== The parties ==
=== Parties Represented in the Legislature ===
Party	Abbr.	Leader	Political position	Ideology	Senators	Assembly members
Progressive Labour Party	PLP	Edward David Burt	Centre-left	Social democracy Social conservatism Anti-colonialism	5 / 11	25 / 36
One Bermuda Alliance	OBA	N. H. Cole Simons	Centre-right	Liberal conservatism	3 / 11	11 / 36

=== Other Parties ===
- Free Democratic Movement: formed on 1 September 2020, it ran as a party in the election of 1 October 2020 but won no seats.

=== Historical parties ===
- United Bermuda Party: multiracial party, formed 1964, dissolved in 2011 after being replaced by the One Bermuda Alliance as the official opposition party
- National Liberal Party: defunct
- Bermuda Democratic Party: 1967 to 1970
- Gombey Liberation Party: defunct, one-man grass roots movement
- Bermuda Democratic Alliance: Political movement founded by seven concerned Bermudians, merging with the One Bermuda Alliance in 2011

== See also ==
- Lists of political parties
