= Jeanne Atherden =

Bermudian politician

Jeanne Atherden is a Bermudian politician who formerly served as a Cabinet Minister from 2014 until 2017 and later as the leader of One Bermuda Alliance (OBA) and Leader of the Opposition in the House of Assembly of Bermuda from November 2017 until September 2018.

== Political career ==
In 2008, she was appointed to serve as a Senator for the United Bermuda Party (UBP) and later became chair of the UBP and Opposition Senate leader in 2010. Following the UBP's merger with the Bermuda Democratic Alliance to form the One Bermuda Alliance, she became the OBA's deputy Chair.

At the 2012 Bermudian general election in which the OBA successfully won a majority, she was elected as the Member of Parliament for Pembroke West. In 2014, she became a Cabinet Minister with responsibility for Health, Seniors, and Environment, although the Environment section of the portfolio was later given to Cole Simons in 2016.

At the 2017 Bermudian general election, Atherden was re-elected as MP for Pembroke West, however the OBA lost the election to the PLP and the OBA became the official opposition. In November 2017, she won the OBA's leadership contest, beating former leaders Patricia Gordon-Pamplin and Craig Cannonier, and becoming Leader of the Opposition.

In September 2018, following a motion of no confidence in her leadership that was backed by 8 of OBA's 11 MPs, Atherden shortly afterwards resigned as OBA leader and Leader of the Opposition, being succeeded by former Premier and party leader Craig Cannonier. She did not run for re-election in Pembroke West at the 2020 Bermudian general election.

== Personal life ==
Atherden's father, Pearl Adderley, was a former UBP candidate and activist. Her brother, Erwin Adderley, is a former UBP MP who ran against her in Pembroke West as an independent at the 2012 election.
