= Marc Bean =

Bermudian politician (born 1974)

The Honourable Marc Bean JP
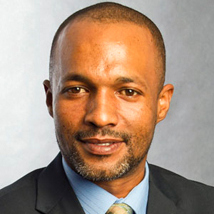

Leader of the Opposition
- In office 21 December 2012 – 4 November 2016
- Monarch: Elizabeth II
- Governor: George Fergusson; Ginny Ferson (acting)
- Preceded by: Derrick Burgess (acting)
- Succeeded by: Edward David Burt

Member of Parliament
- In office 15 December 2010 – 4 November 2016
- Constituency: Warwick South Central
- Preceded by: Ewart Brown

Personal details
- Born: 19 February 1974 (age 52)
- Party: Progressive Labour Party (before 2020); Free Democratic Movement (2020-present)
- Spouse: Simone (m. 2012)
- Children: 3
- Education: Delaware State University

Marc A. Bean (born 19 February 1974) is a Bermudian politician, and the former Leader of the Opposition. Bean was a Member of Bermuda's Parliament since winning a by-election in 2010, securing the seat of Warwick South Central for the Bermuda Progressive Labour Party (PLP). Previously, Bean had served in the Bermuda Senate. While in government, Bean held various ministerial and junior ministerial portfolios, including Environment, Planning and Infrastructure Strategy. In September 2020, he announced that he was forming a new political party, the Free Democratic Movement, to contest the 2020 Bermudian general election.

In addition to being a politician, Bean is also a businessman and a qualified air traffic control specialist, possessing a FAA commercial pilot's license, with multi-engine, and instrument ratings.

== Early life and education ==
Born in Paget, Bermuda, Bean attended the Southampton Glebe Primary School, The Berkeley Institute, Delaware State University, Bailbrook College, and flight school in Atlanta, Georgia.

== Legislative career ==
Bean began his career in politics in June 2008, when he was named a Government Senator under then Premier, Dr. Ewart F. Brown. Bean sat in the Senate until 2010, and served as junior for the Minister of Tourism, Transport, Environment, and Sport, and later, the Ministry of Telecommunications, E-Commerce and Energy.

In December 2010, following the retirement of then-Premier Brown, Bean was elected to replace him as the Parliamentary Representative for Constituency 26, Warwick South Central.

In November 2011 Bean was named to the Cabinet of then-Premier Paula Cox, serving as Minister of Environment, Planning and Infrastructure Strategy. He retained this position until December 2012.

Following the PLP's defeat in the 2012 general election, Bean replaced Cox as Party Leader, thereby becoming Bermuda's newest Opposition Leader.

Despite being a part of the traditionally social-democratic and centre-left PLP, Bean has described himself as a classical liberal, an ideology usually associated with the centre-right.

=== Opposition leader ===
After being chosen to lead the PLP Opposition in December 2012, Bean set out to rebuild the party, and regain the confidence of the electorate. But his time as leader was marked by controversy — and internal clashes that saw seven MPs quit his Shadow Cabinet. In March 2015, he was suspended from Parliament for week after he threatened to “take out” government MPs.

Bean quit politics on 4 November 2016, vacating his post as Opposition Leader, Leader of the Bermuda Progressive Labour Party, and MP for Warwick South Central. He was replaced as Opposition Leader by Edward David Burt, who became premier in the 2017 Bermudian general election

== Free Democratic Movement leader ==
Following the calling of the 2020 election by Bermuda Premier David Burt, Bean announced on September 5, 2020, that he would be leading a new party, called the Free Democratic Movement, to contest the vote. This would be Bermuda's third party to contest the election, in addition to the ruling Progressive Labour Party and the opposition One Bermuda Alliance.

== Family and personal life ==
Bean is Married to his wife, Simone, and has 4 children.

== See also ==
- Leader Marc Bean
- Free Democratic Movement website
