= Edgar F. Gordon =

Caribbean physician and parliamentarian (1895–1955)

Edgar Fitzgerald Gordon
- Born: 20 March 1895; Port of Spain, Trinidad and Tobago
- Died: 20 April 1955 (aged 60); Paget Parish, Bermuda
- Other names: Mazumbo
- Occupations: Physician, parliamentarian, civil-rights activist
- Spouse: Clara Marguerite Christian
- Relatives: Moira Stuart (granddaughter)

Edgar Fitzgerald Gordon (20 March 1895 – 20 April 1955), born in Trinidad and Tobago, was a physician, parliamentarian, civil-rights activist and labour leader in Bermuda, and is regarded as the "father of trade unionism" there: According to Bermuda Biographies, "He championed the cause of Bermudian workers and fought for equal rights for black Bermudians, thereby laying the groundwork for much of the political and social change that came about after his death". He was president of the Bermuda Industrial Union (BIU) 1945–55. Gordon has been described as "perhaps the only black charismatic leader to have emerged in the island's modern political history", and as "Bermuda's most dedicated Pan-Africanist".

In 2011, Gordon was honoured as a National Hero of Bermuda. Other posthumous honours he has been accorded include the Peace & Social Justice Award 2016 from the Catholic Church of Bermuda.

== Early years and education ==
Edgar Fitzgerald Gordon was born to Olympia Jardin and Frederick Charles Gordon in Port of Spain where he received his early education at Queen's Royal College (QRC), graduating as one of the school's most brilliant scholars.

In 1912, he went to Scotland to study medicine at the University of Edinburgh (also becoming involved with the Afro-West Indian Society and pan-African politics). There he met and married a fellow medical student, Clara Christian (who had previously studied music in the US at Hampton Institute in Hampton, Virginia, and Oberlin College, Ohio, and who was the first black woman to study at the University of Edinburgh). To the displeasure of her father George James Christian, a Dominican barrister who had settled in the Gold Coast in 1902, she abandoned her medical studies to begin a family with Gordon.

== Medical career ==
Qualifying as a doctor at the age of 23 in 1918, Gordon was for some time a medical practitioner in the small Scottish town of Kingussie. In 1921, he returned to the Caribbean with his wife Clara and young family. He briefly worked in Trinidad, then went on to become chief medical supervisor in Dominica.

=== Move to Bermuda ===
In 1924, Gordon went to Bermuda, where he set up a busy medical practice on Heathcote Hill in Somerset. According to biographer Ira Philip, Gordon "was brought to Bermuda by Sandys businessman William Robinson to fill a void caused by the death of black Dr Arnold Packwood. The all white local medical board was embarrassed when Dr Gordon passed what he termed was an impossible examination which he contended was calculated to fail him."

Gordon began to take up the cause of black nurses and the discrimination they faced in employment in Bermuda, writing a series of letters, dating from 1929, to the editor of The Royal Gazette, criticising the refusal of the Bermuda Welfare Society to hire Blacks as district nurses. After decades of lobbying, the first black district nurse to be hired was Leonie Harford in 1963.

== Political life ==
After standing unsuccessfully for Parliament in 1933 and 1943, Gordon won a seat in St George's in 1946.

=== Name change ===
On 22 June 1947, in protest at that his fellow parliamentarians persistently refused to address him by his correct title, and that a Bermuda newspaper, the Mid-Ocean News, prefixed "Mr" to the names of white members of Bermuda's Parliament (second oldest in the world), but called him simply Gordon, he announced that henceforth he was to be known by the African name of Mazumbo, with no prefix. His notice to this effect in The Royal Gazette read:

"I, Edgar Fitzgerald Gordon, Bachelor of Medicine and Bachelor of Surgery of Edinburgh University, President General of the Bermuda Industrial Union, President of the Progressive Bermuda League and Member of Parliament for St. George's, hereby declare that from henceforth I shall be known as Mazumbo."

He gave as explanation: "The name Gordon, which I inherited, reminds me very painfully that some Scotsman in some other age compelled a grandmother of mine to submit to his desires. In Bermuda I am black and treated as Bermuda treats the black people. So I want to be called by a name that belongs to my race and requires no prefix." He was further quoted as saying that he had taken his new name from "a famous West African chieftain, who had once been received by Queen Victoria". This was a reference to a 19th-century Trinidadian lawyer called Emmanuel Lazare, popularly known as Mazumbo (or Mzumbo) Lazare, about whom Maureen Warner-Lewis has written: "although born in the Antilles, Lazare appropriated, or condoned the use of, an overtly African designation. The name was a symbol of his identification with black people and the poor. He was a defender of their rights, joined the Pan-African Association founded in 1901 in England by fellow Trinidadian Henry Sylvester Williams, and became a moving spirit behind democratic political reforms at the turn of the twentieth century." This characterisation of Mazumbo Lazare is additional evidence for Gordon's motivation in associating himself with the name.

=== Personality in Parliament ===
As a Member of the Colonial Parliament (MCP), Gordon was a fiery and sometimes controversial orator. After the death in July 1948 of the Speaker of the House of Assembly Sir Reginald Conyers (who in his will left money for the Port Royal School in Hamilton, providing it was "used for the education of white children"), Gordon told a public meeting that he had only attended Conyers' funeral to "make sure he was put in the hole". According to the historian and activist Eva Hodgson, Gordon's "dramatic personality, his drive, and his unabashed theatricals had done what no one else either could do, or chose to do. He had alerted the Negro masses, he had given expression to their unvoiced despair and anger, often his words had given shape and form to emotions which they themselves could hardly define."

=== Bermuda Workers' Association (BWA) ===
Championing the rights of black and working-class Bermudians, Gordon was asked to become president of the Bermuda Workers' Association (BWA) in 1944, which fought for trade union rights and was committed to the removal of segregation and the adoption of universal adult suffrage. Membership of the BWA had by then dwindled to 200 but under Gordon's vigorous leadership it increased to 5,000 in 1945. In 1946, he began his campaign to petition for social and constitutional change, and in that year the Legislature passed Bermuda's first Trade Union and Disputes Act, which was designed to curb the fledgling BWA, making it illegal for a union to have a newspaper or operate a business. Gordon took the lead in the subsequent establishment that year of the Bermuda Industrial Union (BIU), and the BWA for the time being continued as its political arm.

=== Petition to British Colonial Office ===
During an extended visit to England from December 1946 to March 1947, Gordon presented a petition containing more than 5,000 signatures to the British Colonial Secretary from the Bermuda Workers' Association outlining various concerns, including the limited franchise, segregation, and restricted occupational opportunities. Only seven percent of the population could vote, and (as Meredith Ebbin notes) there were more votes cast than actual voters because a property owner could vote in every parish where he owned land. It was a system that gave "the monied classes a distinct and definite control over the election results", Gordon said, pointing out that while the UK and its dependencies had undertaken voting reforms, Bermuda had operated under the same system since 1620.

The matter was debated in the British Parliament, which while condemning many of the practices highlighted in the petition refused Dr. Gordon's request for a Royal Commission to investigate social, political and economic conditions on the island. The Colonial Secretary subsequently issued a document (Command Paper 7093), sent to the Governor, Admiral Sir Ralph Leatham, strongly recommending positive and progressive changes to the colony's discriminatory laws. A Joint Committee of the Bermuda Legislative Council and House of Assembly was formed to study the matter; however, its report in April 1948 recommended against changing the colony's Jim Crow laws, holding that "the early adoption of adult franchise would be prejudicial to the best interests of Bermuda". (It would not be until 1959 that segregation ended, with the BIU playing a key role in the civil disobedience that brought about the change.)

At the 1948 election, Gordon lost his House of Assembly seat – a setback attributable to his preoccupation with a dock workers' dispute that year, which had limited the time he could devote to his Parliamentary duties – but he was re-elected in 1953.

=== Queen's visit to Bermuda ===
In November 1953, when the newly crowned Queen Elizabeth II made Bermuda the first (24-hour) stop in her tour of the Commonwealth, Gordon learned that of more than 1,000 guests to be invited to a Government House garden party in her honour only 60 were black, and that not a single black Bermudian had been asked to attend the official state dinner. With the intention of focusing world attention on Bermuda's racially stratified society, Gordon passed this news to the British press and Reuters reported the resultant angry protests from the Daily Mirror and the Daily Herald. In its editorial the Herald stated: "Perhaps others may benefit from this instance of gross ill manners. It is time everyone from Governors downwards grasped the facts about this British Commonwealth. Within its frontiers coloured people outnumber whites by more than eight to one. One of the moral pledges by which it is held together is that the colour bar should be utterly destroyed as speedily as possible...." As Bernews notes: "The Queen set foot in Bermuda the day the story broke. She was photographed that same afternoon meeting a broadly smiling, tail-coated Dr. Gordon in St. George’s."

== Cricket ==
Keenly interested in cricket, Gordon believed that Bermuda would benefit by closer contact with the islands of the West Indies, which were then gaining ascendancy in Test cricket. He championed the Bermudian cricketer Alma Hunt, who in 1933 went to Trinidad to take part in the trial games from which would be selected the West Indies team for the Test series in England that summer. Although proving himself both on and off the field, Hunt was not eventually given a place. Gordon pointed out that Hunt's status would have been more assured had there been an official body to deal with finance and represent him, and advocated for a Bermuda Cricket Board of Control, which was eventually formed in 1938. Gordon was instrumental in bringing about the first ever West Indian cricket tour to Bermuda in 1939, which was headed by Trinidadian Ben Sealey.

== Family life ==
Gordon had six children with his Dominica-born wife Clara, who joined him in Bermuda after the birth of their fifth child (and first son, their second son being born in Bermuda in 1927). Gordon's grandchildren include British broadcaster Moira Stuart.

By a subsequent relationship, Gordon had other children; his last child Pamela F. Gordon, born six months after her father's death, would become Bermuda's youngest and first female premier, in March 1997, when she replaced David Saul as leader of the United Bermuda Party until that party was defeated for the first time in a general election, in November 1998. Another daughter is MP Patricia Gordon-Pamplin, who having served in various ministerial positions in the OBA Cabinet was announced as OBA interim leader after the change of government in July 2017.

== Death ==
Gordon died in Bermuda, at King Edward VII Memorial Hospital, following a heart attack at the age of 60, on 20 April 1955. Two days later, thousands of people turned out for his funeral service, at St. Theresa's Catholic Cathedral, in Hamilton, and burial at Calvary Cemetery, Devonshire Parish. According to Bermuda Online, "Many of Bermuda's blacks wept at his graveside. That they had a better future was in very large part due to his tireless efforts on their behalf over more than two decades."

== Legacy and honours ==
- The Progressive Labour Party was formed in 1963 as the political arm of the labour movement originally organised and energised by Gordon (some of the party's founders describing themselves as "Gordonites").
- On 1 May 2000, a commemorative pack of postage stamps was issued honouring Gordon as one of three "Pioneers of Progress" – the others being Sir Henry James Tucker and women's suffragist Gladys Misick Morrell (1888–1969) – who made a significant and lasting contribution to Bermudian society.
- Also in 2000, a ward of King Edward VII Memorial Hospital in Paget Parish was renamed the "Dr. E. F. Gordon Ward" after him.
- The Dr E.F. Gordon Memorial Hall at the Bermuda Industrial Union building is named after him, as is Dr E.F. Gordon Square on Dundonald Street.
- An annual Dr E. F. Gordon Memorial Lecture was initiated by educator and author Dale Butler.
- On Bermuda's National Heroes Day in June 2011, Dr Gordon was hailed – alongside Dr. Pauulu Kamarakafego (Dr. Roosevelt Browne) and Sir Henry "Jack" Tucker – as one of the architects of modern Bermuda. In the words of one columnist in Bermuda's Royal Gazette newspaper: "The most challenging times cry out for great leaders who move people and move society forward. The United States had Franklin Roosevelt and Dr Martin Luther King. We had Dr EF Gordon."
- On the launch of a City of Hamilton Walkway of History, a plaque was placed at "Beulah", Gordon's former home – one of 25 such plaques placed at sites and buildings of historical and architectural significance.
- A portrait of Gordon is one of 80 painted by Esther Dai for display at the Historic Museum in Bermuda.
- On 2 February 2015, a mural featuring a portrait of Gordon, as well as the slogan "United we stand, divided we fall", was installed at the Bermuda Industrial Union (BIU) headquarters by The Chewstick Foundation as part of their Community Art Program, honouring him as an icon in the history of the BIU and the evolution of Bermuda's political and social growth.
- On 20 March 2015, a celebration of the 120th anniversary of the birth of Gordon was held in front of City Hall in Hamilton, hosted by Imagine Bermuda with the Department of Community and Cultural Affairs and the Chewstick Foundation.
- In October 2016, Gordon was honoured with the Peace & Social Justice Award 2016 by the Roman Catholic Church of Bermuda, for his "sterling contributions as the father of trade unionism and for championing the rights of Bermudian workers and black Bermudians generally".
- On 18 June 2018, National Heroes Day, Bermuda's Department of Community & Cultural Affairs issued a number of posters portraying those who have made "significant positive contributions to the growth and development of society", including Dr Edgar Fitzgerald Gordon.
