= Elections in Bermuda =

Elections in Bermuda have been taking place since 1620. Bermuda's current electoral system, with a lower house elected by all Bermudian status-holders, each casting a single vote, voting in single-member districts on the first-past-the-post method, came into effect with the 1968 constitution.

== Electoral system ==
Bermuda elects on territorial level a legislature. Parliament has two chambers. The House of Assembly has 36 members, elected for a maximum five-year term in single seat constituencies. The Senate has 11 appointed members. Bermuda does not have fixed election dates; the Governor may dissolve Parliament and call a new election at any time, usually on the advice of the Premier.

Bermuda has a two-party system, which means that there are two dominant political parties (currently called the Progressive Labour Party and the One Bermuda Alliance). Candidates getting elected under the banner of a third party or as an independent has been very rare since 1968 (only occurring in 1985, when two National Liberal Party candidates were elected, and in 1989, when one NLP and one independent candidate were elected).

Constituencies in Bermuda

== Most recent election ==
An election was held on February 18, 2025. The results are below:

Party	Votes	%	Seats	+/–
Progressive Labour Party	12,300	49.64	25	–5
One Bermuda Alliance	9,133	36.86	11	+5
Free Democratic Movement	949	3.83	0	0
Emperial Group	116	0.47	0	New
Independents	2,281	9.21	0	0
Total	24,779	100.00	36	0
Valid votes	24,779	100.00		
Invalid/blank votes	0	0.00		
Total votes	24,779	100.00		
Registered voters/turnout	45,064	54.99		
Source: Parliamentary Registry

== Past elections and referendums ==
Historical election results since 1993: elections archive

== See also ==
- Electoral calendar
- Electoral system
