= Eva Hodgson =

Bermudian activist, writer, union leader, and educator (1924–2020)

Eva Naomi Hodgson (October 9, 1924 – May 29, 2020) was a Bermudian activist, writer, union leader, and educator. She was known for her efforts to fight racism in Bermuda, from the segregation era into the 21st century.

Hodgson was labeled by some as a troublemaker for her uncompromising views. She served as the first president of the desegregated Amalgamated Bermuda Union of Teachers and wrote four books on the racial and labor history of her country.

== Early life and education ==
Hodgson was born in 1924 to a family that had lived in the community of Crawl in Hamilton Parish, Bermuda, for many generations. She was raised in the Brethren evangelical movement and remained a devout Christian throughout her life. Her parents, Harold and Ilene Hodgson, had six children; her mother died young in 1942.

After graduating from the Berkeley Institute, Hodgson attended Queen's University in Ontario on a government scholarship.

== Career ==
=== Education ===
Once she had completed her undergraduate degree, Hodgson returned to Bermuda in 1948 to teach at the Berkeley Institute.

After a year of teaching, she left again to earn a diploma in education from the University of London. She later returned to the institution for an honors degree in geography.

On her return to Bermuda in 1959, Hodgson continued teaching at Berkeley.

In 1967, she went to the United States to study at Columbia University. She obtained two master's degrees followed by a Ph.D. in African and African American history in 1980. During her time in graduate school she went to work at Essex County College in New Jersey, where she became chair of the history department in 1978. She also taught part-time at the College of Staten Island and Rutgers University.

After completing her doctoral degree, Hodgson returned to Bermuda and worked as a school guidance counselor. She was then appointed coordinator of oral history and cultural preservation at the Ministry of Education from 1983 to 1990, which involved both overseeing oral history programs and working to introduce human rights into school curricula.

=== Writing ===
Hodgson wrote her first book, Second Class Citizens, First Class Men, in 1963. Sponsored by the Bermuda Union of Teachers, the book discussed changes in Bermudian politics and society from 1953 to 1963.

She then contributed to the 1974 collection Massa Day Dead?—Black Moods in the Caribbean, writing about "Bermuda and the Search for Blackness."

Her other books, all dealing with the history of black activism in Bermuda, are A Storm in a Teacup (1989), The Joe Mills Story (1995), and The Experience of Racism in Bermuda and in Its Wider Context (2008).

== Activism ==
=== Labor leader ===
As a teacher at Berkeley in the early 1960s, Hodgson became the president of the Bermuda Union of Teachers, an organization of black teachers. In 1965, the two segregated teachers unions merged, and she became the first president of the Amalgamated Bermuda Union of Teachers.

Hodgson was an early member of the government's Labour Relations Advisory Council. She was later given the Russell Award from the World Confederation of Organizations of the Teaching Profession for her work with the teachers union.

=== Anti-racist activist ===
Hodgson said that her experience in the 1940s and '50s living in Canada and England, which were less segregated environments—at least officially—heightened her awareness of the racial injustice she observed and experienced in Bermuda.

On her return to her home country, she began speaking out against inequality; she became known for "her consistently strong stance against racism." She started writing letters to the editor of the Bermuda Recorder and other publications. Hodgson became a longtime contributor to Bermudian periodicals' letter pages, helping shape the conversation on race and racism in the country.

In the 1960s, she worked on the Committee for Universal Adult Suffrage, which fought for equal voting rights. Bermudians were still subject to strict voting restrictions based on property ownership, and Parliament was dominated by powerful white businessmen.

Her anti-racist work helped prompt the founding of the Commission for Unity and Racial Equality in the 1990s, which was later folded into the Human Rights Commission.

In 1992, she co-founded the National Association of Reconciliation, an organization that helped force a national conversation on race in the 15 years of its existence.

Hodgson was a member of the Progressive Labour Party from its formation in 1963, but she did not restrict herself from criticizing members of her own party alongside other politicians and community leaders, which made her enemies along the way. She was frequently pressured to run for political office herself but always declined, having seen what she perceived as the failings and compromises of idealistic politicians after they were elected.

Her friends and family expressed the belief that she suffered in her teaching career because of her political outspokenness. She applied several times to work at Bermuda College and was passed over for less-qualified expatriates.

She was often targeted with criticism for being too combative or controversial, and for focusing too much on race. Her critics labeled her a troublemaker and accused her of looking backward as conditions improved for black Bermudians.

But Hodgson refused to be satisfied with the end of official segregation and the ascendence to political power of black Bermudians, citing a persistent racist mentality among many Bermudians and continued disparities in the country. She allied herself with newer organizations such as Citizens Uprooting Racism in Bermuda, whose General Council she served on until 2018, and continued to push for affirmative action and chastise the government for a lack of real progress until her death.

== Death and recognition ==
Hodgson was named to the Order of the British Empire in the 2012 New Year Honors for her work serving the community in Bermuda.

She died in May 2020 at age 95.

After her death, former prime minister Craig Cannonier eulogized her as "one of Bermuda’s leading social rights campaigners."

== Selected works ==
- Second Class Citizens, First Class Men (1963)
- A Storm in a Teacup—The 1959 Bermuda Theatre Boycott and Its Aftermath (1989)
- The Joe Mills Story: A Bermuda Labour Legend (1995)
- The Experience of Racism in Bermuda and in Its Wider Context (2008)
