= Lionel M. Barnes =

Politician in Bermuda

Lionel M. Barnes MCP was a member of the colonial parliament of Bermuda for the United Bermuda Party for the constituency of Paget West.
