= David Burt (politician) =

Premier of Bermuda since 2017

The Honourable David Burt JP MP

13th Premier of Bermuda
- Incumbent
- Assumed office 19 July 2017
- Monarchs: Elizabeth II; Charles III
- Governor: John Rankin; Rena Lalgie; Andrew Murdoch
- Preceded by: Michael Dunkley

Leader of the Opposition
- In office 4 November 2016 – 18 July 2017; Acting: November 4, 2016 – November 7, 2016
- Monarch: Elizabeth II
- Governor: Ginny Ferson (acting); John Rankin
- Preceded by: Marc Bean
- Succeeded by: Patricia Gordon-Pamplin

Member of the House of Assembly of Bermuda
- Incumbent
- Assumed office 18 December 2012
- Constituency: Pembroke West Central

Personal details
- Born: Edward David Burt; 23 November 1978 (age 47)
- Party: Progressive Labour
- Spouse: Kristin
- Children: 2
- Education: The George Washington University (BBA)

Edward David Burt (born 23 November 1978) is a Bermudian politician who has served as the 13th Premier of Bermuda since 2017, and a member of the House of Assembly of Bermuda from Pembroke West Central since 2012. He was Leader of the Opposition from 2016 to 2017.

== Early life and education ==
Edward David Burt was born on 23 November 1978, to Gerald and Merlin as the youngest of six children. His father was from Bermuda while his mother was from Jamaica. He attended Saltus Grammar School and graduated from the Florida Air Academy in 1996. He graduated cum laude from The George Washington University (GWU) with a Bachelor of Business Administration and double major in Finance and Information Systems in 2001. He obtained a Master of Science degree in information systems development in 2003.

== Career ==
In 2004, Burt established GMD Consulting Limited, an IT consulting company, and was its president until 2016. He served on the Tourism Board and National Training Board.

At GWU Burt was a member of the College Democrats of America. From October 2006 to October 2009, Burt was the chair of the Progressive Labour (PLP). He was the chief of staff of Paula Cox. He became deputy leader in October 2014, and leader on 7 November 2016.

Cox appointed Burt to the Senate of Bermuda in 2010. In the 2012 election Burt won a seat in the House of Assembly of Bermuda from Constituency 18 (Pembroke West Central), defeating incumbent Minister Neletha Butterfield in the primary. He maintained his seat in the 2017, 2020, and 2025 elections.

Marc Bean, the Leader of the Opposition, suffered a stroke and was replaced by Burt. The PLP became the largest party after the 2017 election and Burt became premier on 19 July 2017. He is the youngest person to serve as premier.

== Personal life ==
Burt is married to Kristin, with whom he had two children. He has a private pilot license. He was president of the Alpha Phi Alpha chapter at GWU and wrote opinion editorials for The GW Hatchet.

== See also ==
- List of current heads of government in the United Kingdom and dependencies

== Works cited ==
=== News ===
- "38-y-o David Burt sworn in as Bermuda's new premier". Jamaica Observer. 19 July 2017. Archived from the original on 10 October 2017.
- "New Bermuda premier a "miracle baby"". The Gleaner. 23 July 2017. Archived from the original on 27 June 2025.
- Harris, Cayla (21 July 2017). "Alumnus sworn in as youngest premier of Bermuda". The GW Hatchet. Archived from the original on 27 June 2025.
- Hendrickson, Sékou (24 November 2020). "Louise Franks, 107, and Premier celebrate their shared birthday at KEMH". The Royal Gazette. Archived from the original on 27 June 2025.

=== Web ===
- "Constituency #18 Pembroke West Central General Election Results". Bermuda Elections. Archived from the original on 27 June 2025.
- "E. David Burt". Caribbean Elections. Archived from the original on 23 July 2021.
- "The Premier of Bermuda". Bermuda. Archived from the original on 27 June 2025.
