= Gombey Liberation Movement =

- Leader: Gavin "Djata" Smith
- Chairperson: C. Sterlin Smith
- Deputy leader: Duvall "Dagga" Spencer
- Founded: 3 July 2003
- Headquarters: The Symmetron, 63 King Street, Hamilton, Bermuda
- Ideology: Anti-imperialism

Website
- https://gombeyliberation.wordpress.com/

The Gombey Liberation Movement (GLM), originally the Gombey Liberation Party, is a political organisation in Bermuda that contested the 2003 general election. The party did not contest the next election in 2007 and only ran its leader as a candidate in 2011. It eventually transformed itself into an organisation instead of a party having never attained a seat in the Bermuda Parliament.

Twenty-four-year-old artist and musician Gavin Sundjata Smith, the only known member, created the GLP with the assistance of his brother Corin, a former member of the youth wing of the Progressive Labour Party and future United Bermuda Party candidate, and used the name of a type of local dancer, the Gombey, to attract interest in the party.

== Platform ==
Under the slogan, "The Power of One", the GLP's political platform — directed towards the Bermudian youth — revolved around removing the remnants of colonialism and British influence from Bermuda. Much of this influence comes in the form of the Governor of Bermuda, whom Smith claimed was consolidating his power — backed by a conservative neo-colonial movement — over the Bermuda Police Service, the Bermuda Regiment and the legal and banking systems.

GLP intended to use "therapeutic" instead of "adversarial" measures to attain its goals, including civic engagement and a balance between "grassroots values" and "establishment priorities":

Grassroots values

- Faith
- Family
- Fulfillment
- Fairness
- Freedom
- Fun
- Flexibility
- Unity

Establishment priorities

- Ideology
- Bureaucracy
- Necessity
- Force
- Control
- Protocol
- Efficiency
- Order

Other goals included the rejuvenation of local culture through the establishment of "culture centres" on several derelict sites. More ambitious proposals included relocating the Bermuda International Airport and redeveloping St. George's historic forts for a variety of purposes, as well as initiating truth and reconciliation.

== Public response ==
Though many individuals found Smith and the GLP an entertaining concept, few took him seriously. Of those that did was a section who responded with great hostility, including threats to Smith's family. The origin of this hostility is attributed by some to the use of the phrase "Gombey" and the fact that the GLP was running against then-Premier Jennifer Smith.

== 2003 election ==
During the 2003 general election, founder Gavin Smith was the party's only candidate and ran for the St. George's North constituency, against the PLP's then-Premier Jennifer Smith and the UBP's Kenneth Bascome. He received 16 votes, or about 0.2% of the ballots cast, compared to J. Smith's 423 and Bascome's 415.

G. Smith's final count was the lowest of the election, followed by 41 votes for the National Liberal Party's lone candidate Graeme Outerbridge, and 51 votes for the lone independent candidate Stuart Hayward, both of whom were more publicly known than Smith. In fact, these three, and one each from the two main parties, were the only candidates to receive fewer than a hundred votes.
