= Moira Stuart =

English television newsreader (born 1949)

Moira Stuart CBE
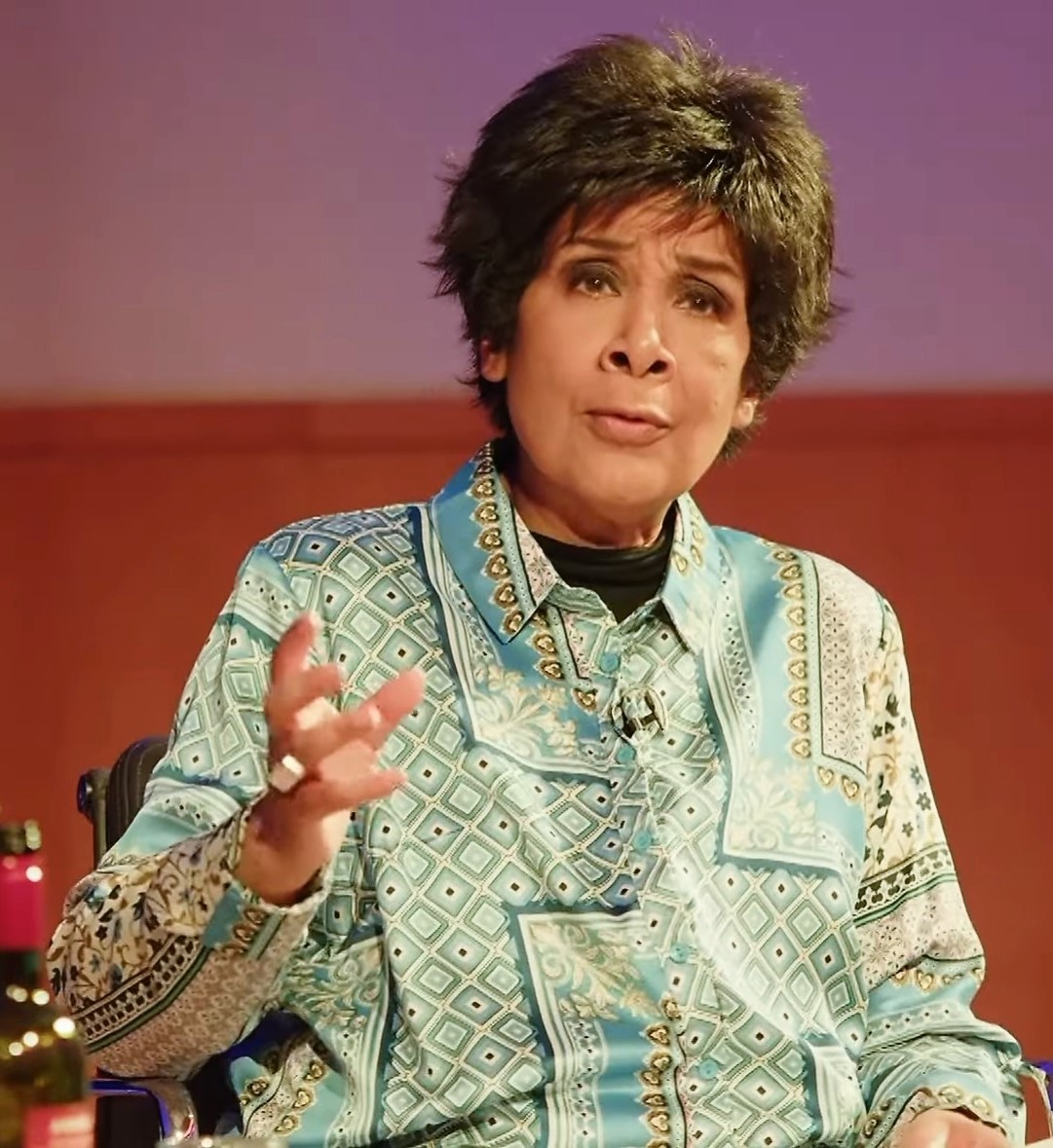
- Stuart speaks at the British Library in 2022
- Born: Moira Clare Ruby Stuart; 2 September 1949 (age 77); London, England
- Occupations: Presenter, newsreader, radio host
- Notable credit(s): BBC News, Classic FM
- Parent(s): Harold Stuart; Marjorie Gordon
- Relatives: Clara Marguerite Christian (grandmother); Edgar Fitzgerald Gordon (grandfather); Margaret Busby (cousin)

Moira Clare Ruby Stuart (born 2 September 1949) is a British TV presenter and broadcaster. She was the first female newsreader of Caribbean heritage to appear on British national television, having worked on BBC News since 1981.

In a career spanning four decades, beginning in the 1970s, Stuart presented a variety of television news and radio programmes for the BBC and Classic FM.

Stuart has received several awards during her career, including being appointed an Officer of the Order of the British Empire (OBE) in 2001, for services to broadcasting, and a Commander of the Order of the British Empire (CBE) in 2022, for services to media.

== Early life ==
Moira Stuart was born at the Royal Free Hospital in London, on 2 September 1949, to Caribbean parents: her mother, Marjorie Gordon, was from Dominica and her father, Harold Stuart, a lawyer, was from Barbados. She has two sisters, Sandra Simmons and Sharon Davis-Murdoch. Her maternal grandfather, Edgar Fitzgerald Gordon, met his wife, Clara Christian, when both were studying medicine at the University of Edinburgh, where she was the first black woman student.

She was educated in London until she was 13, attending Our Lady's Catholic High School, Stamford Hill. She then moved with her family to Bermuda for a time, returning at the age of 15 to London, where she attended college.

== Career ==
=== Early career ===
Stuart began working with the BBC in the 1970s and was a production assistant in the Radio Talks and Documentaries department. She was a continuity announcer and newsreader for both BBC Radio 4 and BBC Radio 2, reading her first Radio 4 news bulletin in 1978, and in 1980 she played Darong in series one of game show The Adventure Game. She moved to television news in 1981, when she co-presented News After Noon.

=== TV news career ===
Stuart was the UK's first female British-Caribbean television newsreader. Since 27 August 1981, she has presented on every news bulletin devised on BBC Television apart from the Ten O'Clock News. She has also appeared on The News Quiz and presented the news on the BBC's Breakfast with Frost programme each Sunday and its successor programme Sunday AM with Andrew Marr. She presented the news for BBC Breakfast, until 2 May 2006, when the broadcast was reorganised. Stuart retained her slot on BBC's Sunday AM show and continued to present some weekend television bulletins on BBC One. She also worked on other long-form programmes for other BBC channels, including BBC Four.

"Throughout her 30-plus years at the BBC,
Moira has achieved a great deal.
She has always been a model professional
as well as being much loved and admired
by both the public and her BBC colleagues.
Everyone in BBC News wishes her
all the best for the future."

— Helen Boaden, Director of BBC News (2007).

In April 2007 she left Sunday AM, resulting in the loss of a regular slot on broadcast TV. This prompted a backlash, accusing the BBC of ageism and sexism. The BBC initially declined to comment on why she was no longer being used, but rumours circulated within the BBC and commercial newsrooms that Stuart had been removed because she was considered "too old" at 57, although Anna Ford had continued anchoring the BBC One O'Clock News until her retirement at 62. This was denied by Director-General of the BBC Mark Thompson when he was questioned by a House of Commons culture, media and sport select committee. Thompson stated: "BBC News, News 24, the radio networks, have changed over the years and the traditional role of the newsreader, as opposed to a correspondent or presenter, has virtually died out over the services.... We tend to use journalists across BBC news programmes ... to read the news headlines."

Stuart's 26-year career with BBC Television News ended on 3 October 2007. In total, her experience had spanned 34 years of BBC radio and TV.

In April 2009, the departing head of BBC News, Peter Horrocks, was quoted as saying: "I regret the way some viewed her departure. Many people came to believe that Moira left for reasons of ageism, or other -isms. This was never the case."

In February 2009, Stuart narrated a Channel 4 documentary programme on ageism called Too Old to Work, looking at ageism in the jobs market, which was broadcast in the Dispatches series.

She returned to BBC News, reading the news for The Chris Evans Breakfast Show, on 11 January 2010. She presented her last bulletins for the show on 14 December 2018.

She later joined Classic FM, from February 2019, to present the news on weekdays during the breakfast show, and from July 2019 would be presenting her own Saturday afternoon show, Moira Stuart’s Hall of Fame Concert. Stuart, who described the move as "a wonderful opportunity to take a whole new journey, with people I really like and admire", made her debut on Classic FM on 11 February 2019.

From 9 August 2020, she hosted a Sunday evening series, Moira Stuart Meets…, and later, The Hall of Fame Concert, on Classic FM.

=== Other projects ===
A keen music lover, Stuart deputised for Humphrey Lyttelton on his BBC Radio 2 Best of Jazz programme, has participated in the BBC Jazz Awards as compère, and features as a narrator on Soweto Kinch's 2006 jazz-rap album A Life in the Day of B19: Tales of the Tower Block.

With Adam Shaw, she also presented the BBC Two personal finance series Cashing In.

Stuart has served on various boards and judging panels including Amnesty International, the Royal Television Society, BAFTA, United Nations Association, the Orange Prize, the London Fair Play Consortium, the Human Genetics Commission, the Queen's Anniversary Prize, and the Grierson Trust.

In November 2004, Stuart was the subject of an episode of the BBC genealogy documentary series Who Do You Think You Are? (series 1, episode 6), which helped trace her family history.

Stuart was a judge (alongside Jo Brand, Jude Kelly and Joanne Harris) for the Orange Prize in 2005, when the winner was Lionel Shriver with We Need to Talk About Kevin.

In 2006, Stuart played a comic version of herself in the Ricky Gervais television comedy Extras, supposedly involved in supplying drugs to Ronnie Corbett.

In March 2007 she also presented the documentary In Search of Wilberforce for BBC Television, examining the role of anti-slavery campaigner William Wilberforce to coincide with the 200th anniversary of the British bill that banned the slave trade. According to a review of the programme: "The documentary is well-structured and the informed questioning by Stuart enables a debunking of the Wilberforce legend and a challenge to the myopia in Britain which focuses upon the abolitionists rather than those who were enslaved."

On 2 June 2007, she hosted the BBC One topical news quiz show Have I Got News for You, and was well received by the public. The extended and uncut version of the programme (shown the following evening, 3 June 2007) revealed that, while making a spoof appeal for work, she fluffed her lines on a number of occasions but took it all with her traditional good humour.

On 16 November 2007, she visited Mill Hill School in Ripley, Derbyshire, to officially open the new school building alongside Councillor Alan Charles from Derbyshire County Council.

In 2008, 2009 and 2010, she appeared in a series of advertisements for HMRC promoting tax-return procedures.

In March 2014, Stuart began hosting the Sunday late-night BBC Radio 2 programme Music Until Midnight, a slot that previously broadcast David Jacobs' long-running Easy listening programme until 2013. She alternates this Sunday-night slot with Oscar-winning songwriter Don Black. She has also presented music documentary series for Radio 2, including Strong and Sassy - Inspiring Women of Jazz (featuring Carmen McRae, Sarah Vaughan, Adelaide Hall, Anita O'Day and Lena Horne) and Jazz Guitar Greats.

In July 2015, Stuart appeared on the television comedy panel show Would I Lie to You? (Series 9, Episode 1).

In 2021, it was announced that she would dance with Aljaž Škorjanec in the Strictly Come Dancing Christmas Special, which was broadcast on Christmas Day. In 2022, she announced the terms and conditions for the Strictly Come Dancing Halloween Special.

In November 2022, Stuart appeared as a guest presenter on Countdown, as part of the Channel 4 show's 40th birthday celebrations.

In September 2024, Stuart decided to speak out after she fell victim to a sophisticated bank scam, stating that it nearly cost her a fortune.

=== Family ===
Her mother, Marjorie Gordon (1921–2017), who was born in Dominica, and her father Harold Stuart (1914–1966), a Barbadian lawyer, divorced when Stuart was ten months old. Her uncle was the singer Ken Gordon, who was a member, with George Browne, of the vocal trio Three Just Men. Her cousin is the Ghana-born publisher and editor Margaret Busby.

Talking about her ancestry, Stuart has said that she is from a "long line of outsiders" and that she considers herself "a true mongrel – and proud of it". For the 2004 edition of Who Do You Think You Are? in which she featured, she visited the Scottish Highlands, as well as to Antigua (where her great-great-grandfather was enslaved) and to Dominica, where her great-grandfather George James Christian was born. Christian was a delegate at the 1900 First Pan-African Conference in London (making a speech that was reported in The Times, about the treatment of South Africans in the Boer War), before migrating to the Gold Coast, West Africa.

During the programme, she discovered the story of how her maternal grandfather Edgar Fitzgerald Gordon met his wife Clara Christian when both were studying medicine at the University of Edinburgh, where she was the first black woman student. While he completed his degree and qualified as a doctor in 1918 (initially going into practice in Kingussie), Stuart's grandmother did not finish medical studies, using money intended for her course to pay their bills instead. The couple ultimately settled in Bermuda, where in addition to being a physician Gordon became a parliamentarian, civil-rights activist and labour leader. In the programme, Stuart was visibly moved to learn more about her ancestors in the context of the Atlantic slave trade, and about their fight for human rights and social justice.

In 2021, she discovered through research by Ancestry UK that, during the Second World War, her mother had worked as a nurse probationer at St Helier Hospital and the children's hospital on the same site, Queen Mary's Hospital in Carshalton. These twin hospitals were among the most heavily bombed hospitals in England.

Stuart recalled: "She told me once that literally every time there was a bombing raid, she would take all of the children out of their beds, put them underneath the beds for protection, and those that she couldn't move she would cover with her own body."

== Honours, awards and achievements ==
Stuart was appointed Officer of the Order of the British Empire (OBE) in the 2001 Birthday Honours for services to broadcasting and Commander of the Order of the British Empire (CBE) in the 2022 New Year Honours for services to media.

- 1988: voted "Best Newscaster of the Year" (1988) by the TV and Radio Industries Club Awards.
- 1989: voted "Best Television Personality" by the Women of Achievement Awards.
- 1994: named "Best Female Television Personality" by the Black Journalists' Association.
- 1997: named "Best Media Personality" by The Voice newspaper.
- 2001: appointed Officer of the Order of the British Empire (OBE)
- 2002: named "Media Personality of 2002" at the EMMA Awards.
- 2003: named one of "100 Great Black Britons".
- 2006: received an honorary doctorate from the University of Edinburgh, the university where her grandparents met.
- 2008: named "Oldie Autocutie of the Year" for her outstanding contribution to television by The Oldie magazine.
- 2012: awarded the degree Honorary Doctor of Letters by De Montfort University.
- 2013: received an honorary doctorate from Canterbury Christ Church University.
- 2020: received Harvey Lee Award for Outstanding Contribution to Broadcasting at Broadcasting Press Guild Awards.
- 2022: appointed Commander of the Order of the British Empire (CBE) for services to media.
- 2022: honorary degree of Doctor of Letters from Northumbria University, Newcastle.
