= Rena Lalgie =

Governor of Bermuda 2020-2025

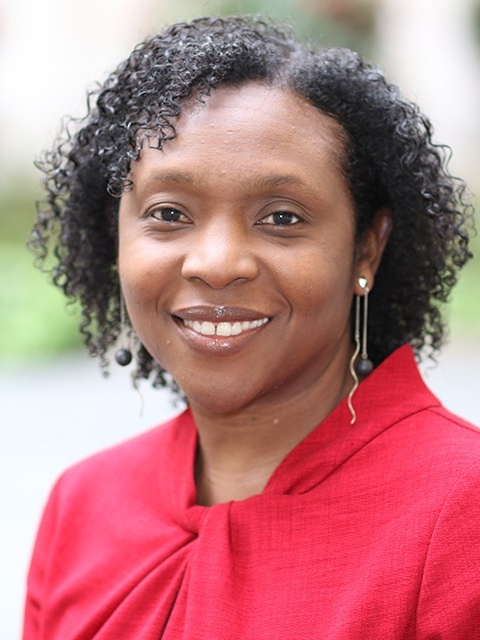
- Rena Lalgie in 2020

Governor of Bermuda
- In office 14 December 2020 – 14 January 2025
- Monarchs: Elizabeth II; Charles III
- Premier: Edward David Burt
- Preceded by: John Rankin
- Succeeded by: Tom Oppenheim (acting); Andrew Murdoch

Rena Lalgie is a British civil servant who served as Governor of Bermuda from December 2020 to January 2025. She was the first woman, and the first person of African-Caribbean heritage, to be appointed governor of Bermuda.

== Career ==
Lalgie has worked in various roles for the Home Office, the Cabinet Office, and the Department for Business, Innovation and Skills. She was director of operations at UK Trade & Investment, now the Department for International Trade. She then became head of the Office of Financial Sanctions Implementation (OFSI), created within the UK Treasury in 2016 to implement and enforce financial sanctions.

Diplomatic posts
Preceded by John Rankin	Governor of Bermuda; 2020–2025	Succeeded by Andrew Murdoch
