= Patricia Gordon-Pamplin =

Bermudian politician

- Education: The Berkeley Institute
- Occupation: Politician
- Political party: United Bermuda Party; One Bermuda Alliance
- Parent(s): Mildred Layne Bean and Edgar F. Gordon
- Relatives: Pamela Gordon (sister)

Patricia Gordon-Pamplin is a politician from Bermuda who formerly served in the Cabinet and as a member of the House of Assembly.

== Early life ==
Gordon-Pamplin's parents were Mildred Bean and Edgar F. Gordon, a prominent trade unionist leader. She studied at The Berkeley Institute and graduated in the class of 1966.

== Political career ==
Gordon-Pamplin first ran for elected office in 1993, running as an independent to protest a foreign spouse policy. In 1998, she contested Pembroke East for the United Bermuda Party (UBP), but she was unsuccessful. Shortly after the election, she was appointed to the Senate by UBP party leader and her sister, Pamela Gordon. In 1999, Gordon-Pamplin ran in a by-election for Paget West and was successful, and was re-elected as an MP in 2003, 2007, 2012, and 2017 (later running as a One Bermuda Alliance (OBA) candidate in the 2010s upon the party succeeding the UBP). From 2012 to 2017, she served as a Cabinet Minister in the OBA government under Premier Michael Dunkley.

In July 2017, she became interim leader of the One Bermuda Alliance (OBA) and acting Leader of the Opposition. In November 2017, she sought election as leader of OBA but lost to Jeanne Atherden. In 2020, she sought election to the Devonshire East constituency but was not successful.

== Personal life ==
Gordon-Pamplin's sister is former Premier Pamela Gordon.
