= Andrew Murdoch (civil servant) =

Governor of Bermuda

His Excellency Commander Andrew Murdoch CMG CVO
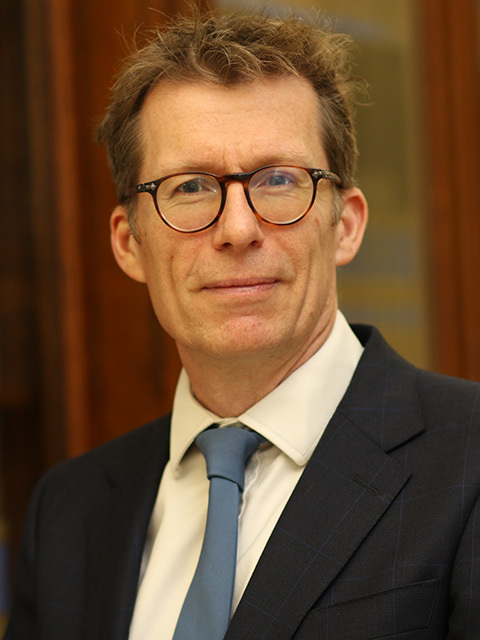
- Murdoch in 2022

Governor of Bermuda
- Incumbent
- Assumed office 23 January 2025
- Monarch: Charles III
- Premier: Edward David Burt
- Preceded by: Tom Oppenheim (acting); Rena Lalgie

Personal details
- Education: Van Mildert College, Durham

Military service
- Branch/service: Royal Navy
- Years of service: 1990–2011
- Rank: Commander
- Commands: Director of the Naval Legal Services

Andrew Murdoch CMG CVO is a British civil servant serving as the Governor of Bermuda since 23 January 2025. Murdoch is also a barrister and has served as a commissioned officer in the British Royal Navy. Murdoch achieved the rank of commander and left the Royal Navy after serving as the Director of the Naval Legal Services from 2009 to 2011.

He was also the owner of Palmerston (2014–2026), a black-and-white tuxedo cat, and the former Chief Mouser of the Foreign & Commonwealth Office (FCO) at Whitehall in London, and the "feline relations consultant" to Murdoch in his role as Governor of Bermuda.

== Career ==
=== Early life and education ===
Murdoch grew up on the coast, and spent his teenage years working on commercial fishing boats before becoming a sea cadet. He studied Geology at Durham University, graduating in 1994.

=== Naval and legal career ===
From 1990 to 1998 Murdoch was a midshipman in the Royal Navy as the deputy logistics officer of the HMS Campbeltown. As a lieutenant, Murdoch underwent legal training to become a barrister. He served as the Assistant Chief Naval Judge Advocate from 2001 to 2002. Then from 2003 to 2004 he was the logistics officer of the HMS York.

Murdoch would continue to rise in the ranks of the navy's legal department, as from 2004 to 2005 he was the Higher Authority Legal Advisor for the Navy. From 2006 to 2008 he was a lieutenant commander and Deputy Fleet Legal Advisor before being appointed Fleet Legal Adviser. During the Iraq War from 2008 to 2009 he was the Coalition Maritime Force legal advisor in Bahrain. Murdoch finally reached the top of the naval legal ladder, serving as Director of the Naval Legal Services from 2009 to 2011. Murdoch would leave the Royal Navy as a commander.

Afterwards, from 2011 to 2014 he was a legal advisor to the Foreign and Commonwealth Office for International Institutions and Security Policy. Then from 2015 to 2016 he was the legal director of the FCO's International Institutions and Security Policy. Starting from 2016 he is the Legal Director and Director of Ocean Policy of the Foreign, Commonwealth and Development Office.

=== Governor of Bermuda ===
On 18 September 2024, Murdoch was appointed the Governor of Bermuda.

Murdoch was sworn in as governor on 22 January 2025 and pledged to be "approachable and accessible" and that he looked forward to cooperating with the Bermudan government. Murdoch also highlighted in his inauguration speech that Bermuda is on the front-lines of climate change and that he is passionate about working on the essential protection of the Bermudan ecosystem. Murdoch's celebrity cat, Palmerston, formerly the Chief Mouser of the Foreign, Commonwealth and Development Office, accompanied him to Bermuda.

On 31 January 2025 he announced that he was accepting résumés for members of the public to become one of the three independent senators appointed by the governor, encouraging any "qualified persons" to put forward their credentials.

Murdoch congratulated Premier David Burt on 19 February 2025, after the 2025 Bermudian general election, stating that "I would like to record my thanks to all those who enabled a safe, peaceful and democratic electoral process."

Murdoch's first official tour of the Royal Bermuda Regiment occurred on 6 March 2025, where he visited cadets at Warwick Camp, performing their fitness test, and the Royal Bermuda Regiment Coast Guard base in Sandys.

Murdoch was appointed a Companion of the Order of St Michael and St George (CMG) in the 2025 Birthday Honours. On 18 May Murdoch announced military collaboration with Jamaica, meeting with Vice-Admiral Antonette Wemyss-Gorman, the first female Jamaican Chief of Defence Staff.

On 7 June Murdoch visited King Charles III in London alongside the Colonel-in-Chief of the Royal Bermuda Regiment; Birgitte the Duchess of Gloucester. Shortly after on 14 June Murdoch organized a celebration of Charles' official birthday (Note: Charles was born on 14 November, however, each Commonwealth realm can celebrate an 'official' birthday on a date of their choosing.) consisting of a parade of the Royal Bermuda Regiment, Bermuda Police Service and Police Reserves and the Bermuda Sea Cadet Corps with Murdoch participating in full ceremonial garb.

On 24 June Murdoch voiced support for reforming how DNA analysis is used in the Bermudian police system, advocating for reducing inaccuracy. This came shortly after Julian Washington, a man sentenced to life in prison for a murder in 2012, was released due to the Director of Public Prosecutions finding gross inaccuracies in the DNA evidence that was key in his sentencing.

On 8 August Murdoch announced support for British efforts to roll back liberal Marijuana laws in Bermuda, arguing that the laws were in violation of international treaties and conventions.

On 30 April 2026, Murdoch, alongside David Burt, welcomed King Charles III on the latter's first visit to Bermuda as monarch. On 2 May 2026, the King appointed Murdoch a Commander of the Royal Victorian Order (CVO) at the conclusion of his visit.

== Ownership of Palmerston ==
Murdoch was the owner of Palmerston (2014–2026), a black-and-white tuxedo cat, and the former Chief Mouser of the Foreign & Commonwealth Office (FCO) at Whitehall in London from 13 April 2016 to his retirement on 7 August 2020, and on 3 February 2025 it was reported that Palmerston had come out of retirement to take up a new role in Bermuda as the "feline relations consultant" to Murdoch in his role as Governor of Bermuda.

== Sources ==
- Andrew Murdoch Appointed As New Governor

Diplomatic posts
Preceded by Rena Lalgie	Governor of Bermuda; 2025–present	Incumbent
