= Parliament of Bermuda =

Bicameral legislature of Bermuda

Type
- Type: Bicameral
- Houses: Senate; House of Assembly

History
- Founded: 1 August 1620; 406 years ago

Leadership
- Monarch: Charles III since 8 September 2022
- Governor: Andrew Murdoch since 23 January 2025
- President of the Senate: Joan Dillas-Wright, Independent
- Speaker of the House of Assembly: Dennis Lister, Progressive Labour

Structure
- Seats: 47
- Political groups: His Majesty's Government (25): Progressive Labour (25); His Majesty's Loyal Opposition (11): One Bermuda Alliance (11)
- Political groups: His Majesty's Government (5): Progressive Labour (5); His Majesty's Loyal Opposition (6): One Bermuda Alliance (3); Independent (3)

Elections
- Last election: 18 February 2025

Meeting place
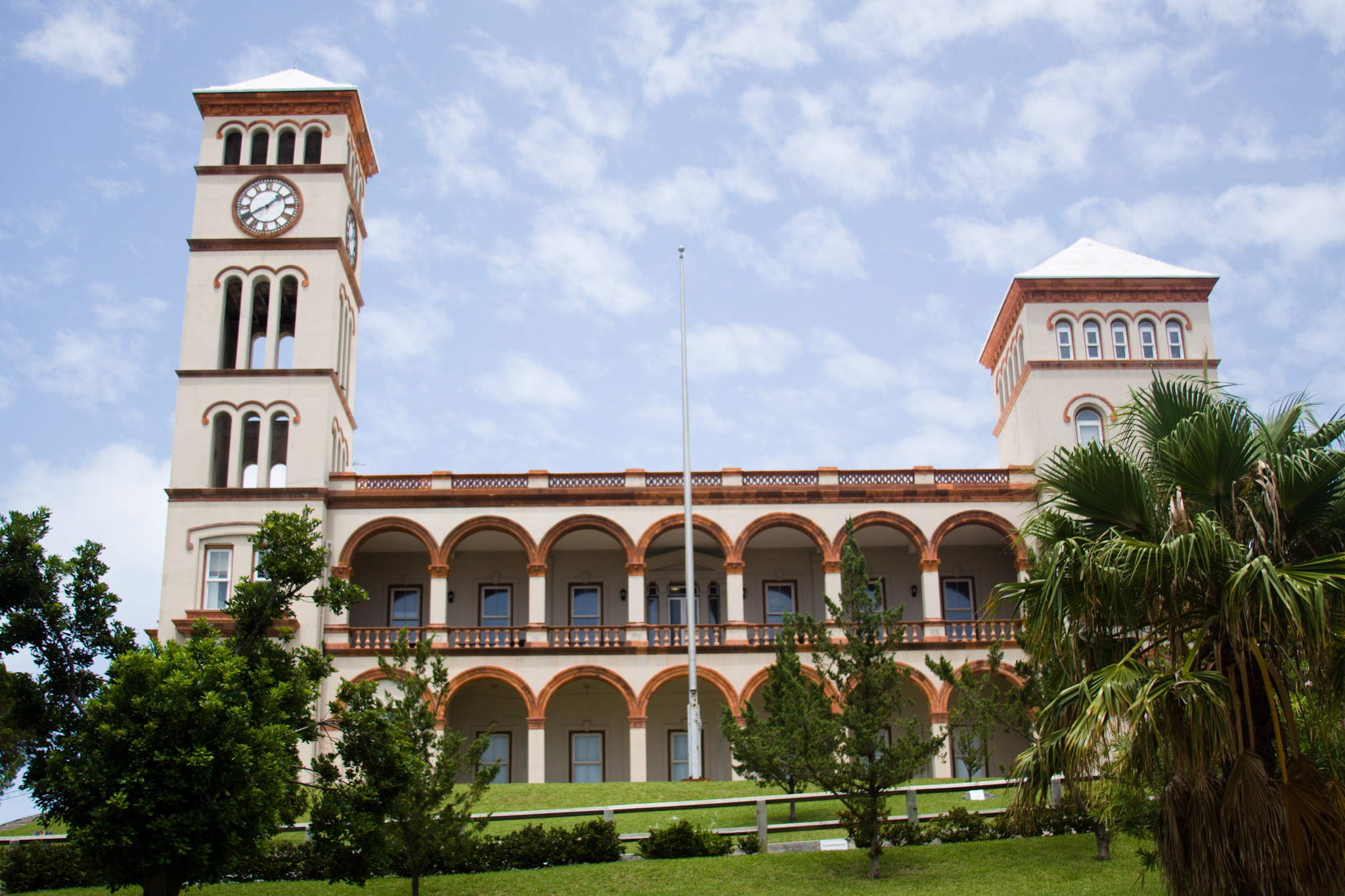
- House of Assembly Building, Hamilton

Website
- parliament.bm

The Parliament of Bermuda is the bicameral legislative body of the British Overseas Territory of Bermuda. Based on the Westminster system, one of the two chambers (lower house) is elected; the other (upper house) is appointed.

The two chambers are:

- House of Assembly (36 members; elected for a five-year term in 36 single-seat constituencies)
- Senate (11 appointed members)

Originally, the House of Assembly was the only house in the legislature. It held its first session in 1620, making Bermuda's Parliament amongst the world's oldest legislatures and the oldest extant legislature in the Americas. An appointed Privy Council originally performed roles similar to those of an upper house and of a cabinet.

A major constitutional change took place in 1968. The Legislative Council was replaced with an appointed Senate as part of a reorganisation of the Parliament of Bermuda into a bicameral system; Bermuda is the only British Overseas Territory to have such a system. Political parties were legalised, and universal adult suffrage adopted. The position of Premier was also introduced as leader of the ruling party, and an official opposition.

== 2025 election results ==
Party	Votes	%	Seats	+/–
Progressive Labour Party	12,300	49.64	25	–5
One Bermuda Alliance	9,133	36.86	11	+5
Free Democratic Movement	949	3.83	0	0
Emperial Group	116	0.47	0	New
Independents	2,281	9.21	0	0
Total	24,779	100.00	36	0
Valid votes	24,779	100.00		
Invalid/blank votes	0	0.00		
Total votes	24,779	100.00		
Registered voters/turnout	45,064	54.99		
Source: Parliamentary Registry
