= Clara Marguerite Christian =

First black woman to study at University of Edinburgh (1895–1964)

- Born: May 1895; Dominica, West Indies
- Died: 24 September 1964 (aged 69); Bermuda
- Education: Hampton Institute; Oberlin College; University of Edinburgh
- Known for: First black woman to study at the University of Edinburgh
- Spouse: Edgar Fitzgerald Gordon
- Relatives: Moira Stuart (grand-daughter); Margaret Busby (niece); Phyllis Christian (niece)

Clara Marguerite Christian (May 1895 – 24 September 1964), born in Dominica, was the first black woman to study at the University of Edinburgh, enrolling as a medical student in 1915, and she went on to be a "highly respected" mother of six. Her university experience speaks to the "double jeopardy" of "navigating both race and gender within whiteness", embodying "the simultaneous invisibility and hyper-visibility" of being a black woman in Edinburgh during the 1910s. She married fellow student Edgar Fitzgerald Gordon, and in the 1920s moved with him to Bermuda, where he joined the medical service, and where she spent the rest of her life.

== Life ==
=== Early life and education ===
Clara Christian was born in Dominica during May 1895; her middle name is also given as Margaret. Her parents were Virginia Boland and George James Christian, the renowned barrister and pan-Africanist, who migrated to the Gold Coast (present-day Ghana) in 1902. After her mother died, Clara was educated at a convent school in Edinburgh, Scotland. She went on to study at the Hampton Institute and Oberlin College in the United States of America, where she trained as a singer. In 1915, she enrolled as a medical student, having "obstinately insisted on taking a full medical course at Edinburgh", becoming the first black woman to study at the University of Edinburgh.

In Scotland, Clara was a member of the Edinburgh Afro-West Indian Association, alongside South African medical student Manasseh Robert Mahlangeni. She started a relationship with and married fellow association member and medical student Edgar Gordon, and gave birth to their first child, Barbara, in Edinburgh in 1917. Against the wishes of her father, Clara dropped out of her degree after marrying Gordon, and waited for her Trinidadian-born husband to complete his studies.

=== Subsequent life and legacy ===
After Gordon qualified in 1918, he and Clara moved to Kinguissie, near Inverness in the Scottish Highlands, where he worked as a doctor, and their next two children – twins Joyce and Evelyn – were born. The couple returned to the Caribbean in 1921, and Gordon worked briefly in Trinidad, then moved on to Dominica, where he became chief medical supervisor, and where their daughter Marjorie (the mother of Moira Stuart) was born in 1921. In 1924 Gordon went to join the medical service in Bermuda, where the family subsequently settled, and Clara gave birth to sons Edgar and Kenneth. Becoming involved in the life of the community, she organized cultural gatherings, including musical soirees, at their home, and Gordon "established a busy practice". Their marriage, however, deteriorated and they separated permanently in 1927 because of "irreconcilable matrimonial problems". According to her father George James Christian, Edgar Gordon subsequently refused "to do his duty by her".

In 1937, Clara successfully applied for a job in the Gold Coast as assistant matron at Achimota School (where another of G. J. Christian's daughters, Sarah – the mother of Margaret Busby – had earlier worked as a nursing sister) but turned down the post because of the job's insecurity, poor pay and poor prospects.

Despite numerous legal battles with her former husband, Clara successfully brought up her daughters as a single mother: Barbara studied at the Royal Academy of Music, Joyce trained as a nurse in England and subsequently moved to the USA, Evelyn trained as a beautician and moved to New York, while Marjorie became a nurse in London, eventually returned to Bermuda and on her retirement joined her youngest daughter in Nova Scotia, Canada. Clara's two sons, Edgar — known as Teddy and later as Hakim — and Kenneth Gordon, meanwhile, enrolled as medical students at the University of Edinburgh in 1944. Ghanaian student Emmanuel Evans-Anfom remembered the "Gordons from Trinidad" in 1940s Edinburgh: "West Indians exhibited airs of superiority but when they came into contact with students from West Africa they found we were all educated and in some cases better than themselves." The brothers did not complete their medical studies due to financial difficulties; Hakim became an ethnologist, travelling the world with his wife and children, and Ken Gordon went on to become a successful jazz musician in London, forming a vocal group called the Four Tune-Tellers, before joining another group, the Three Just Men, alongside calypsonian George Browne and Horace Dawson, "presenting a repertoire that ranged from spirituals to bebop".

== Death ==
Clara Christian died in Bermuda on 24 September 1964 and her funeral was held on 1 October.
