= Ginny Ferson =

British diplomat

Ginny Ferson OBE

Governor of Bermuda Acting
- In office 2 August 2016 – 5 December 2016
- Monarch: Elizabeth II
- Premier: Michael Dunkley
- Preceded by: George Fergusson
- Succeeded by: John Rankin

Deputy Governor of Bermuda
- Incumbent
- Assumed office December 2013

Deputy Governor of the Pitcairn Islands
- In office 2007–2012

Personal details
- Born: 1963 (age 62–63) Ashby-de-la-Zouch, England, United Kingdom
- Profession: Diplomat

Ginny Ferson OBE (born 1963) is a British diplomat, who, since December 2013, has served as Deputy Governor of Bermuda. For several months during 2016 she served as Acting Governor of Bermuda. Ferson served as Deputy Governor of Pitcairn from 2007 until 2012.

== Career ==
Ferson joined the Foreign and Commonwealth Office in 1987 having previously worked for Leicestershire County Council. She has worked in Mauritius, Luxembourg, South Korea and Pakistan.

In 2016 she was appointed to a role in St Helena overseeing the implementation of the recommendations of a review into child protection on the island.

She was appointed as an Officer of the Order of the British Empire in the Queen's Birthday Honours List in June 2017 in recognition of her work in "child safeguarding in the British Overseas Territories."
