= Pamela Gordon (Bermudian politician) =

Bermudian politician (born 1955)

The Honourable Dame Pamela Gordon DBE

6th Premier of Bermuda
- In office 27 March 1997 – 10 November 1998
- Monarch: Elizabeth II
- Governor: Thorold Masefield
- Preceded by: David Saul
- Succeeded by: Jennifer M. Smith

Personal details
- Born: Pamela Felicity Gordon; September 1955 (age 71) Hamilton, Bermuda
- Party: United Bermuda Party
- Parent(s): Mildred Layne Bean and Edgar F. Gordon
- Relatives: Patricia Gordon-Pamplin (sister)
- Education: Queen's University at Kingston

Dame Pamela Felicity Gordon, DBE (born 1955) is a Bermudian politician who served as Premier of Bermuda from March 1997 until November 1998.

== Early life and education ==
Gordon was born in Hamilton, Bermuda, in September 1955, the daughter of Edgar F. Gordon, a civil rights activist and labour leader who died six months before her birth, and Mildred Layne Bean. Gordon was the youngest of five children born to her father and mother. Gordon became pregnant at 16, which meant she was forced to leave the private school she attended. She subsequently attended Alma College in Ontario, Canada. Gordon attended Queen's University at Kingston, Ontario, and earned a Master of Business Administration degree.

She married the father of her daughter and they had another child, a son. However, the marriage ended in divorce. She is currently married to S. Andrew Banks.

== Career ==
Prior to entering politics, Gordon owned and managed a restaurant. Gordon was appointed to the Bermuda Senate in 1990, representing the United Bermuda Party (UBP). The centre-right UBP was the main opponent of the centre-left Progressive Labour Party founded by the political associates of her father. Gordon served as cabinet minister for Youth Development, Sports and Recreation between 1992 and 1995. She was elected as a Member of Parliament in 1993, representing Southampton West, and became Minister for the Environment, Planning, and Natural Resources in 1995. In 1997, Gordon became leader of UBP and the Premier of Bermuda. She was the youngest Premier and the first female Premier.

== After office ==
Gordon has been active in a number of organizations and campaigns concerning gender equality. She chaired the Scholarship committee with the Montpelier Foundation. She also serves on the Queen's University Smith School of Business Global Council. She was inducted into the Council of Women World Leaders. She serves as Chairman of the Global Rhodes Scholar Selection Committee.

== Honours ==
In 2004, Gordon was honoured by Queen Elizabeth as a Dame Commander of the Most Excellent Order of the British Empire (DBE), for public service. Gordon received an honorary Doctor of Laws (LLD) degree from the University of New Brunswick in 1998. In 2013, she subsequently received an honorary Doctor of Laws degree (LLD) from her alma mater, Queen's University in Canada.

In December 2015, Gordon was honoured at a gala in New York celebrating female empowerment hosted by the Girl Be Heard theatre company. The company praised Gordon, saying: "Dame Pamela Gordon-Banks has broken countless ceilings, educationally and economically. She thinks globally and acts locally." Gordon-Banks is the recipient of the 2019 George Parkin Service Award at Oxford University.

In 2025, she listed by The Bermudian among "10 of Bermuda's Most Influential Women".
