= John Rankin (diplomat) =

British diplomat; Governor of the British Virgin Islands

John Rankin CMG
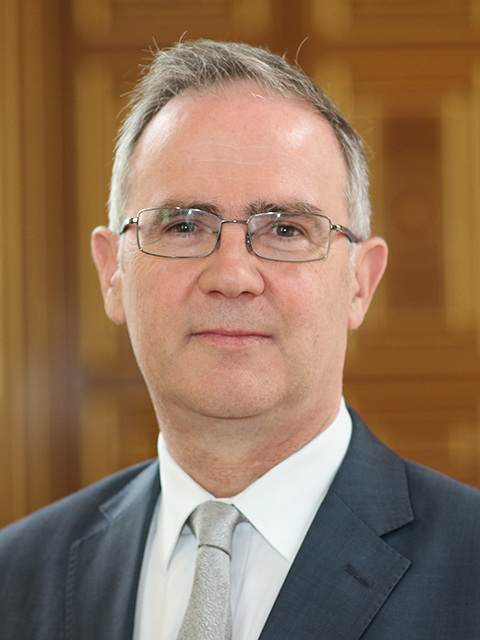

Governor of the British Virgin Islands
- In office 29 January 2021 – 18 January 2024
- Monarchs: Elizabeth II; Charles III
- Premier: Andrew Fahie; Natalio Wheatley
- Preceded by: Augustus Jaspert
- Succeeded by: Daniel Pruce

Governor of Bermuda
- In office 5 December 2016 – 12 December 2020
- Monarch: Elizabeth II
- Premier: Michael Dunkley; Edward David Burt
- Preceded by: Ginny Ferson (acting)
- Succeeded by: Rena Lalgie

British High Commissioner to Sri Lanka
- In office 2011–2015
- Monarch: Elizabeth II
- Preceded by: Peter Hayes
- Succeeded by: James Dauris

British Consul-General in Boston
- In office 2003–2007
- Monarch: Elizabeth II
- Preceded by: George Fergusson
- Succeeded by: Phil Budden

Personal details
- Born: John James Rankin; 12 March 1957 (age 69) United Kingdom
- Education: University of Glasgow; McGill University

John James Rankin, CMG (born 12 March 1957) is a British diplomat and a former ambassador to Nepal. He served as the Governor of the British Virgin Islands from January 2021 to January 2024. He was the Governor of Bermuda from December 2016 to December 2020.

== Early life and education ==
Rankin was born on 12 March 1957. He was educated at Hutchesons' Boys' Grammar School, a private school in Glasgow, Scotland. He studied Scots law at the University of Glasgow, graduating with a first class honours Bachelor of Laws degree. He later studied international law at McGill University, graduating with a Master of Laws degree.

== Career ==
=== Legal career ===
Rankin qualified and practised as a solicitor in Scotland; he was a member of the Law Society of Scotland. He was additionally a lecturer in public law at the University of Aberdeen from 1984 to 1988.

=== Diplomatic career ===
Rankin joined the Foreign and Commonwealth Office (FCO) in 1988. Between posts at the FCO, he served at the embassy in Dublin and was the consul-general at Boston. He took up his appointment as High Commissioner to Sri Lanka and non-resident High Commissioner to the Maldives in February 2011. In 2015, he was appointed Ambassador to Nepal.

He was appointed Companion of the Order of St Michael and St George (CMG) in the 2016 New Year Honours.

=== Governor ===
Rankin was sworn in as Governor of Bermuda on 5 December 2016. In February 2018, signed into law the Domestic Partnership Act 2018, which effectively reversed the right of gay couples to marry. This made Bermuda the first jurisdiction to legalise and then repeal same-sex marriage rights. The law relating to same-sex marriage in Bermuda could change again, as the Supreme Court stated in June 2018 that repealing same-sex marriage rights was discriminatory and thus contrary to section 12 of the Bermudian Constitution. Rankin did delay granting royal assent to refer the matter to the British government but the government declined to recommend refusing royal assent due to the constitutional convention that the British government would not interfere with decisions taken by the British Overseas Territories' legislatures.

In September 2020, it was announced that Rankin would be replacing Gus Jaspert as Governor of the British Virgin Islands in 2021. As such, he was replaced in December 2020 by Rena Lalgie as Governor of Bermuda.

Rankin was sworn in as Governor of the British Virgin Islands on 29 January 2021, after arriving in the territory and observing the mandatory 14-day quarantine due to COVID-19.

== Personal life ==
Johns' wife, Lesley Marshall, separated from him in 2015 and they subsequently divorced in 2019. In 2018 John met his partner, Bermudian / Canadian Tara Curtis while he was Governor in Bermuda. Tara was the previous CEO of Bermuda Cancer and Health Centre, a non-profit Centre which successfully brought Radiotherapy treatment to the island in 2017. Tara joined John in the BVI during his Governorship from 2021 until 2024. John and his first wife Lesley have a son and two daughters. John is now happily retired with his current partner Tara in Pyford, Surrey.

== Publications ==
- The Right of Self-determination: Its Nature, Content and Beneficiaries in International Law, McGill University, 1984

Diplomatic posts
Preceded by George Fergusson	Consul-General in Boston; 2003–2007	Succeeded by Phil Budden
Preceded by Peter Hayes	High Commissioner to Sri Lanka and the Maldives; 2011–2015	Succeeded by James Dauris
Preceded by Andrew Sparkes	Ambassador to Nepal; 2015	Succeeded by Richard Morris
Preceded by Ginny Ferson; Acting	Governor of Bermuda; 2016–2020	Succeeded by Rena Lalgie
Preceded by Augustus Jaspert	Governor of the Virgin Islands; 2020–2024	Succeeded by Daniel Pruce
