= Derrick Burgess (politician) =

Bermudian politician

The Honourable Derrick Burgess JP MP
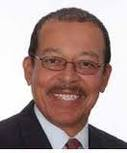
- In office 28 October 2010 – 18 December 2012
- Monarch: Elizabeth II
- Governor: Sir Richard Gozney
- Constituency: Hamilton East (House of Assembly)

Personal details
- Party: Progressive Labour Party

Derrick V. Burgess is a Bermudian politician, former labour union leader and hotel executive. The Hon. Derrick V. Burgess was elected Deputy Leader of the Progressive Labour Party and Deputy Premier of Bermuda on 28 October 2010, immediately following the election of the Hon. Paula Cox, JP, MP as Premier of Bermuda. Four days later, he was named Minister of Public Works.

A graduate from the now-closed Robert Crawford School in Prospect, Mr Burgess earned a Diploma in Hotel Management from the Lewis Hotel School in Washington, D.C., and has pursued programmes of study at Bermuda College, the City College of Chicago, the University of Maryland, the Lewis Hotel School in Washington, D.C., and the George Meany Labour College, also in Washington, D.C. Having commenced his career as a busboy at the now defunct Coral Island Hotel, he rose to the post of General Manager. He later worked at the now defunct Holiday Inn, later Loews Bermuda, later Club Med Hotel, and at the Hamilton Princess Hotel. In addition, he has served as Director of Human Resources at Grotto Bay Beach Resort.

Known for his background in the unions, he held the full-time post of President of the Bermuda Industrial Union [BIU]. His involvement in trade unionism commenced upon his election as shop steward at the Holiday Inn Hotel. In October 2001, he was elected First Vice President of the Caribbean Congress of Labour, the first Bermudian to hold that position.

He has travelled extensively throughout the United States and the Caribbean, and Geneva, Switzerland wearing the hat of a trade unionist. In December 2004, Mr. Burgess was re-elected to the position of 1st Vice President for the Caribbean Congress of Labour.

He was first elected to Parliament in February 1998 during a by-election representing constituency 5, Hamilton East. On 1 September 2006, he was appointed Minister of Labour, Home Affairs and Public Safety, with his Ministry re-configured as the Ministry of Labour and Immigration some three months later. Previous to being elected as Deputy Leader, he served in the capacity of Minister of Works & Engineering.

A member of St. Phillip's A.M.E. Church, Derrick Burgess is married to the former Brenda Walker of St. George's, and they have three children, two foster children and five grandchildren.

Commission of Inquiry

On 6 October 2017, Derrick Burgess gave testimony to the Bermuda Commission of Inquiry under Sir Anthony Evans looking into financial irregularities in the Auditor General's Report. Mr. Burgess' testimony was abrasive and unhelpful labelling the commission a "Lynch Mob".
