= 2012 Bermudian general election =

- 17 December 2012

All 36 seats in the House of Assembly 19 seats needed for a majority
- Registered: 43,652
- Turnout: 71.10% (▼4.77pp)
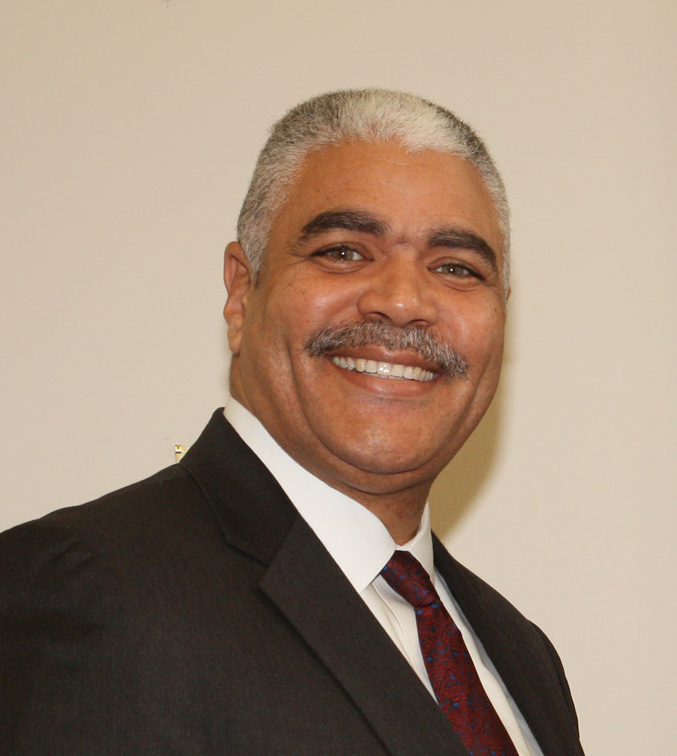

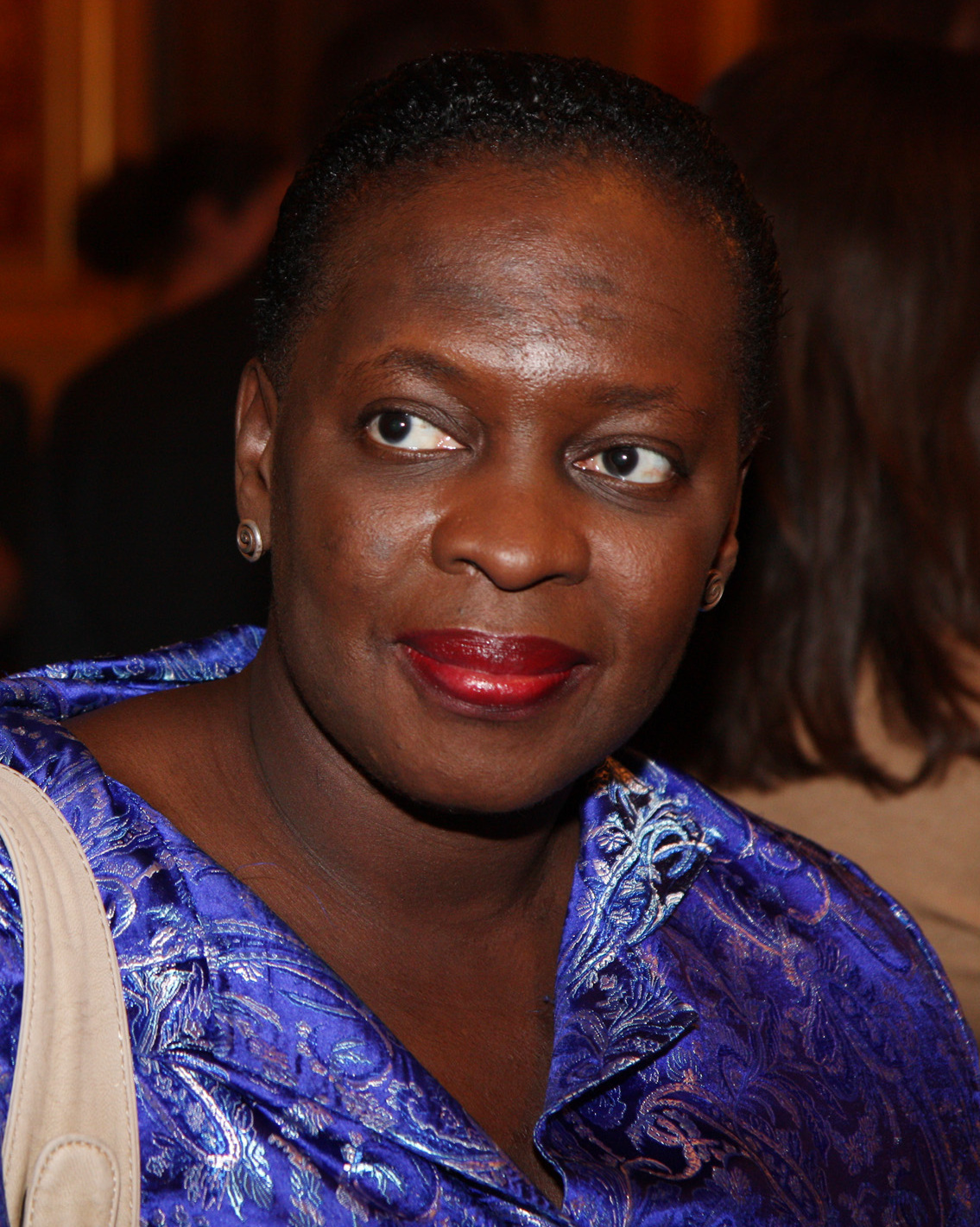
| | First party | Second party |
|---|---|---|
| Leader | Craig Cannonier | Paula Cox |
| Party | OBA | PLP |
| Last election | 47.34%, 14 seats | 52.45%, 22 seats |
| Seats won | 19 | 17 |
| Seat change | ▲5 | ▼5 |
| Popular vote | 15,949 | 14,218 |
| Percentage | 51.68% | 46.07% |
| Swing | ▲4.36pp | ▼6.37pp |
- Results by constituency
Premier before election
Paula Cox
PLP
Elected Premier
Craig Cannonier
OBA

General elections were held in Bermuda on 17 December 2012 to elect all 36 members of the House of Assembly. The result was a victory for the One Bermuda Alliance, led by Craig Cannonier, which won 19 seats in the House of Assembly. The incumbent Progressive Labour Party (PLP) lost five seats and government, and Premier Paula Cox lost her Devonshire North West seat, and resigned as leader of the PLP the next day, with Derrick Burgess becoming Acting Party Leader. Marc Bean became PLP leader on 22 December 2012.

== Results ==
| Party | Votes | % | Seats | +/– |
|---|---|---|---|---|
| One Bermuda Alliance | 15,949 | 51.68 | 19 | +5 |
| Progressive Labour Party | 14,218 | 46.07 | 17 | –5 |
| Independents | 695 | 2.25 | 0 | 0 |
| Total | 30,862 | 100.00 | 36 | 0 |
| Valid votes | 30,862 | 99.44 | | |
| Invalid/blank votes | 174 | 0.56 | | |
| Total votes | 31,036 | 100.00 | | |
| Registered voters/turnout | 43,652 | 71.10 | | |
Source: Parliamentary Registry
