= 2017 Bermudian general election =

- 18 July 2017
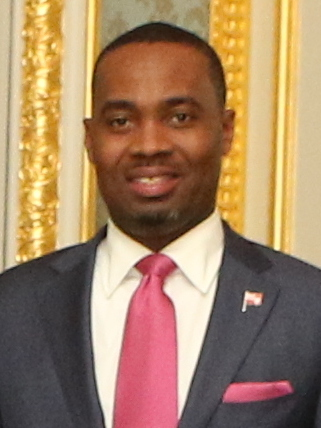

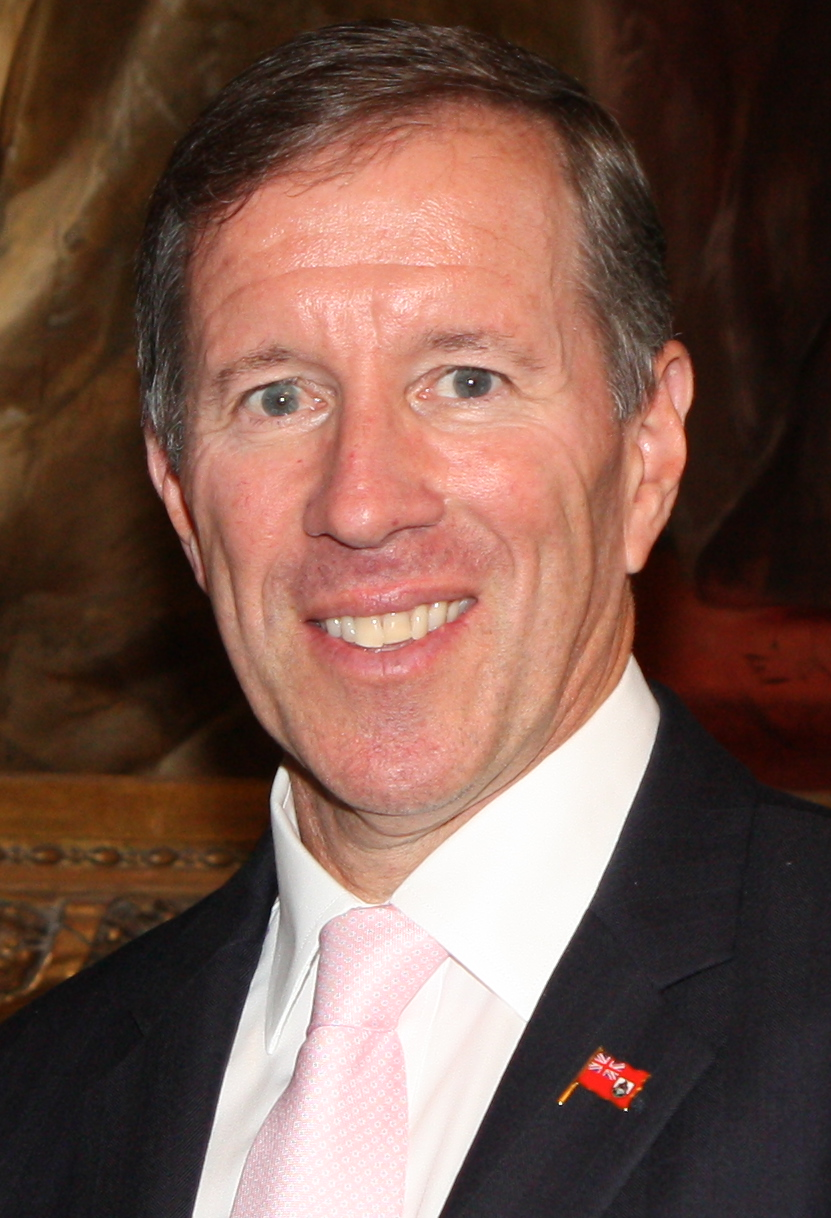
	First party	Second party
Leader	Edward David Burt	Michael Dunkley
Party	PLP	OBA
Last election	17	19
Seats won	24	12
Seat change	▲7	▼7
Popular vote	20,059	13,837
Percentage	58.88%	40.62%
Swing	▲12.81pp	▼11.06pp
Premier before election
Michael Dunkley
OBA
Elected Premier
Edward David Burt
PLP

General elections were held in Bermuda on 18 July 2017 to elect all 36 members to the House of Assembly. The result was a victory for the opposition Progressive Labour Party, which won 24 of the 36 seats. Incumbent Premier Michael Dunkley subsequently resigned as leader of the One Bermuda Alliance. Bob Richards, a senior minister and deputy premier in Dunkley's government unexpectedly lost his Devonshire East seat.

== Background ==
Under section 49(2) of the Bermuda Constitution Order 1968, the Parliament of Bermuda must be dissolved by the Governor five years after its first meeting following the previous elections (unless the Premier advises the Governor to dissolve parliament sooner). Under section 51(1) of the Constitution, a general election must be held no later than three months after a dissolution. As the first meeting of the parliament elected in December 2012 took place on 8 February 2013, meaning parliament would have needed to be dissolved before midnight on 7 February 2018 for elections to take place before 7 May 2018.

However, after the ruling One Bermuda Alliance lost its majority in the House of Assembly when two of its MPs left to sit as independents, the opposition Progressive Labour Party proposed a vote of no-confidence which was scheduled for 9 June 2017. Dunkley pre-empted the vote on 8 June 2017 by asking the Governor to dissolve the House and call elections for 18 July 2017.

== Campaign ==
The PLP was widely considered to have run on a populist platform, highlighting peoples' disenchantment with the political system. The campaign had been compared to the UK Independence Party and Donald Trump's electoral campaigns. The party's campaign slogan was "Let's Put Bermudians First".

In contrast, the OBA had campaigned on its economic record in government, using the slogan "Forward Together, Not Back".

== Results ==
Party	Votes	%	Seats	+/–
Progressive Labour Party	20,059	58.88	24	+7
One Bermuda Alliance	13,837	40.62	12	–7
Independents	169	0.50	0	0
Total	34,065	100.00	36	0
Registered voters/turnout	46,669	–		
Source: Parliamentary Registry

== Irregularities ==
The taxpayer-funded Parliamentary Registry, Bermuda's election management body, assisted the PLP, supplying the party — but not their opponents — with contact information for all registered voters to aid in their campaigning. According to Parliamentary Registrar Tenia Woolridge shortly after the election, there is no law prohibiting this release and that such an action would be solely at the discretion of the Registrar; she further admitted that the Registry had begun sending the PLP the information in 2012 under Ms. Woolridge's predecessor, Kenneth Randolph Scott. The Registry ceased assisting the PLP four days prior to the election, when the OBA became aware and made a complaint. One year after the election, the OBA issued a press release criticising the refusal of the Registry to release a report on the incident, to which the Registry responded by claiming that the Governor of Bermuda had already settled the matter in a letter and also declaring that it would refuse any further comment until unspecified "inaccuracies" made by the OBA in June, 2018, in connection to the issue were corrected.
