= Dennis Lister =

Bermudian politician

Dennis Lister is a Bermudian politician who is serving as Speaker of House of Assembly of Bermuda. He is the longest serving member of parliament of Progressive Labour Party.
