= 2025 Bermudian general election =

- 18 February 2025

All 36 seats in the House of Assembly 19 seats needed for a majority
- Registered: 45,064
- Turnout: 54.99% (▼6.21pp)
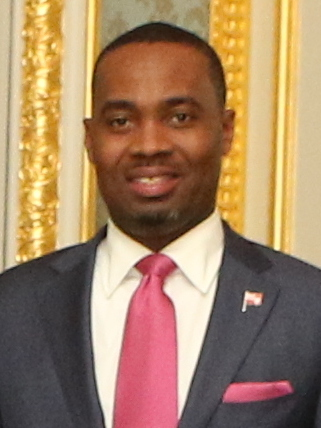

	First party	Second party
Leader	Edward David Burt	Jarion Richardson
Party	PLP	OBA
Last election	62.09%, 30 seats	32.27%, 6 seats
Seats won	25	11
Seat change	▼5	▲5
Popular vote	12,300	9,133
Percentage	49.64%	36.86%
Swing	▼12.45pp	▲4.59pp
- Results by constituency
Premier before election
Edward David Burt
PLP
Elected Premier
Edward David Burt
PLP

General elections were held in Bermuda on 18 February 2025 to elect all 36 members of the House of Assembly.

== Background ==
Prior to the election, the PLP was the dominant party in Bermudian politics, having unseated the OBA in the 2017 general election. In the subsequent 2020 election, the PLP expanded its majority to 30 seats.

Premier Edward David Burt has governed Bermuda since winning the 2017 general election. He has announced on October 19, 2022, his intention to step down as PLP leader in 2026.

== Electoral system ==
The House of Assembly has 36 members, elected by first-past-the-post voting from single-member constituencies.

== Campaign ==
The 2025 general election featured a record-setting 109 candidates, including representatives from the PLP, OBA, FDM, and numerous independents. Emperial Group filed a single candidate.

Economic issues, particularly the cost of living and social programs, were central to the campaign. While the PLP emphasized efforts to reduce high costs and highlighted its governing record on fairness, the OBA criticized the government's handling of economic and social issues, positioning itself as an alternative to improve governance.

Political analysts predicted a closer contest compared to the 2020 election, suggesting that while the PLP was expected to retain power, its victory margin would narrow.

== Contesting parties ==
Party	Position	Ideology	Last election
Progressive Labour Party	Centre-left	Social conservatism Social democracy Anti-colonialism	30 / 36 (83%)
One Bermuda Alliance	Centre-right	Liberal conservatism	6 / 36 (17%)
Free Democratic Movement	Centre-right	Conservative liberalism Subsidiarity	0 / 36 (0%)

== Results ==
Party	Votes	%	Seats	+/–
Progressive Labour Party	12,300	49.64	25	–5
One Bermuda Alliance	9,133	36.86	11	+5
Free Democratic Movement	949	3.83	0	0
Emperial Group	116	0.47	0	New
Independents	2,281	9.21	0	0
Total	24,779	100.00	36	0
Valid votes	24,779	100.00		
Invalid/blank votes	0	0.00		
Total votes	24,779	100.00		
Registered voters/turnout	45,064	54.99		
Source: Parliamentary Registry

== Reactions ==
In a speech outside party headquarters after the election, David Burt reaffirmed his party's commitment to focus on tackling the high cost of living, expensive healthcare, and reform the education system. He emphasized his party’s support for lower and middle-class residents and declared that "Bermudians have chosen progress, fairness, and a PLP government that will deliver for you."

Jarion Richardson, leader of the One Bermuda Alliance (OBA), acknowledged the election results and reaffirmed his party’s commitment to Bermuda. He pledged to serve as a "strong and dedicated opposition" and encouraged OBA candidates, both elected and unelected, to remain engaged in efforts to strengthen the party and the country.
