= George Fergusson (diplomat) =

British diplomat (born 1955)

The Honourable George Fergusson
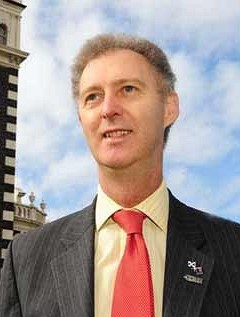

Governor of Bermuda
- In office 23 May 2012 – 2 August 2016
- Monarch: Elizabeth II
- Premier: Paula Cox; Craig Cannonier; Michael Dunkley
- Preceded by: David Arkley (Acting)
- Succeeded by: Ginny Ferson (Acting)

Governor of Pitcairn
- In office 2 May 2006 – May 2010
- Preceded by: Richard Fell
- Succeeded by: Vicki Treadell
- Born: 30 September 1955 (age 71); Scotland, United Kingdom
- Education: Eton College; Magdalen College, Oxford
- Spouse: Margaret Wookey
- Father: Bernard Fergusson

George Duncan Raukawa Fergusson (born 30 September 1955) is a British diplomat. He was the British High Commissioner to New Zealand and Samoa, and the Governor of the Pitcairn Islands, from 2006 to 2010. He was the Governor of Bermuda from 2012 to 2016.

== Early life ==
George Fergusson was born in 1955, the son of Baron Ballantrae, who was Governor-General of New Zealand 1962–1967. His middle name "Raukawa" is Māori and reflects the history of Fergussons being appointed to vice-regal posts in New Zealand (two Governors and two Governors-General; George Fergusson is a direct descendant of all four). He was educated at Eton College and Magdalen College, Oxford, where he edited the student newspaper The Tributary.

== Political career ==
Viceregal styles of The Hon. George Fergusson (2012–2016)
- Reference style: His Excellency
- Spoken style: Your Excellency

Fergusson joined the Northern Ireland Office in 1978. While serving in Belfast he introduced the Foreign Office to Christie Davies's humorous suggestion that Northern Ireland be the new home of Hong Kong's British population when the territory was handed over to China in 1997. In 1988 he transferred to the Foreign Office as 1st Secretary (Political) in Dublin.

From 1991 to 1993, he was in the Soviet and then the Eastern Department of the Foreign and Commonwealth Office in London. From 1994, he was 1st Secretary (Political/Information) in Seoul, and in 1996 he returned to London as Deputy Head of the Southern African Department. Later, in 1996, he became Head of the Republic of Ireland Department.

In 1999, Fergusson became Consul-General in Boston, and in 2003 was seconded to the Cabinet Office as Head of the Foreign Policy Team.

In 2006 he was appointed High Commissioner to New Zealand and Samoa, and Governor of the Pitcairn Islands. He left this Wellington based post in May 2010.

Fergusson was seriously injured in a mugging attack on 20 April 2012 in London. He suffered facial injuries that resulted in loss of the sight in his left eye.

In May 2012, Fergusson took over as Governor of Bermuda from the retiring Sir Richard Gozney and served until August 2016.

== Family ==
He is married to Margaret (née Wookey), and they have three daughters. The couple also had a son, who died in 2005.

Diplomatic posts
Preceded by James Poston	British Consul-General in Boston; 1999–2003	Succeeded by John Rankin
Preceded by Richard Fell	British High Commissioner to New Zealand; 2006–2010	Succeeded by Victoria Treadell
Preceded by Richard Fell	(Non-resident) Governor of the Pitcairn Islands; 2006–2010	Succeeded by Victoria Treadell
Preceded by Richard Fell	(Non-resident) British High; Commissioner of Samoa; 2006–2010	Succeeded by Victoria Treadell
Preceded by David Arkley; Acting	Governor of Bermuda; 2012–2016	Succeeded by Ginny Ferson; Acting
