= Free Democratic Movement =

- Abbreviation: FDM
- Leader: Marc Bean
- Founded: 1 September 2020
- Split from: Progressive Labour Party
- Headquarters: Melbourne House, 11 Parliament Street; Hamilton
- Ideology: Conservative liberalism Classical liberalism Subsidiarity
- Political position: Centre-right
- Colours: Green; Gold; Red
- Senate: 0 / 11
- House of Assembly: 0 / 36

Website
- fdmbermuda.com

The Free Democratic Movement (FDM) is the newest of the three political parties in Bermuda. It was founded by former Progressive Labour Party leader Marc Bean in September 2020 to contest the 2020 Bermudian general election on October 1, 2020. It fielded 14 candidates for the 36-seat legislature, winning no seats and placing second in 4 races, with 5% of the vote.

== Policies ==
Bean identifies as a classical liberal.

The FDM's policies include:

- Individual rights
- Limited government
- Equality
- Subsidiarity
- Spontaneous order
- Property rights
- Honesty among citizens (aka 'The Golden Rule')

In the area of education, the FDM wants to downsize the Department of Education to improve efficiency, introduce a school voucher system as well as an independent system to monitor the performance of schools, and devolve control of what schools teach to educators.

Among other issues, the FDM wants to abolish taxes on sugar and dividends, and has stated its neutrality to same-sex marriage.

The party did not have any published activity after the 2020 election until 2024, when leader Marc Bean announced that the party intended to "re-emerge", although he did not commit to leading the party into the next elections.

In October 2024, Bean stood for the FDM in the by-election for Sandys North, coming in second to Emily Gail Dill, who polled 162 votes, to 108 for Bean, 95 for independent candidate Ci’re Bean, and 91 for Carl Neblett of the One Bermuda Alliance.

== Party leaders ==
Leader	Entered office	Left office
Marc Bean	September 2020	present

== Election results ==
Election	Party leader	Votes			Seats			Position	Government
Election	Party leader	No.	%	±	No. of candidates	No. of seats won	±	Position	Government
2020	Marc Bean	1,384	5.37%	New	14	0 / 36	New	3rd	Extra-parliamentary
2025	Marc Bean	949	3.83%	▼1.54	10	0 / 36	0	3rd	Extra-parliamentary
