= Bermuda Democratic Alliance =

- Leader: Craig Cannonier
- Founded: 5 November 2009
- Dissolved: 16 May 2011
- Split from: United Bermuda Party
- Merged into: One Bermuda Alliance
- Ideology: Liberalism
- Political position: Centre

The Bermuda Democratic Alliance (BDA) was a political party in Bermuda which lasted from its foundation in November 2009 until its merger into the One Bermuda Alliance in May 2011.

== History ==
The BDA was founded on 5 November 2009, by six defecting members of the United Bermuda Party (UBP): Shawn Crockwell, Donte Hunt, Mark Pettingill, Wayne Scott, Michael Fahy, and Sean Pitcher. It later elected businessman Craig Cannonier as its leader.

The party contested one by-election in December 2010, finishing third behind the Progressive Labour Party (PLP) and the UBP. The PLP retained almost the same level of support that it received in the 2007 general election, while the UBP share of the 2007 vote was split between the UBP and BDA. Concerns of vote-splitting among anti-PLP voters led to negotiations between the BDA and the UBP to merge into a new party, culminating with the formation of the One Bermuda Alliance in 2011.

It described itself as a government that stands for equality of opportunity, social and economic justice, fiscal responsibility, security and safety, environmental sustainability, transparency, honesty and fairness in government. They promote a political philosophy that is rational, liberal and progressive.

== Founders of the Bermuda Democratic Alliance ==
	Joined party
Mark Pettingill	2009
Sean Pitcher	2009
Shawn Crockwell	2009
Donte Hunt	2009
Wayne Scott	2009
Michael Fahy	2009
Michael W. Branco	2009

== Platform ==
The Bermuda Democratic Alliance core values are:

1. A democratic process with integrity and broad participation by all Bermudians;
2. A modern justice system that is fair, sensible, cohesive, swift and accessible to all;
3. A society that is inclusive, embraces diversity and equal opportunity and protects everyone's human rights;
4. Government policies which are fair and transparent and reward hard work, family loyalty, trustworthy behaviour and initiative;
5. Government that is fiscally responsible: careful in its spending, honest in its financial reporting and works for the betterment of our people;
6. Government that will protect Bermuda's assets for our children through protecting the environment, preserving our public institutions and prudently managing public assets;
7. An education system that will ensure all of Bermuda's people are equipped with the knowledge and understanding to preserve our freedoms and maintain our prosperity;
8. Political leadership that acts for the greater good of Bermuda both locally and abroad and prepares us for the future.
