= Craig Cannonier =

Bermuda politician (born 1963)

The Honourable Craig Cannonier JP MP
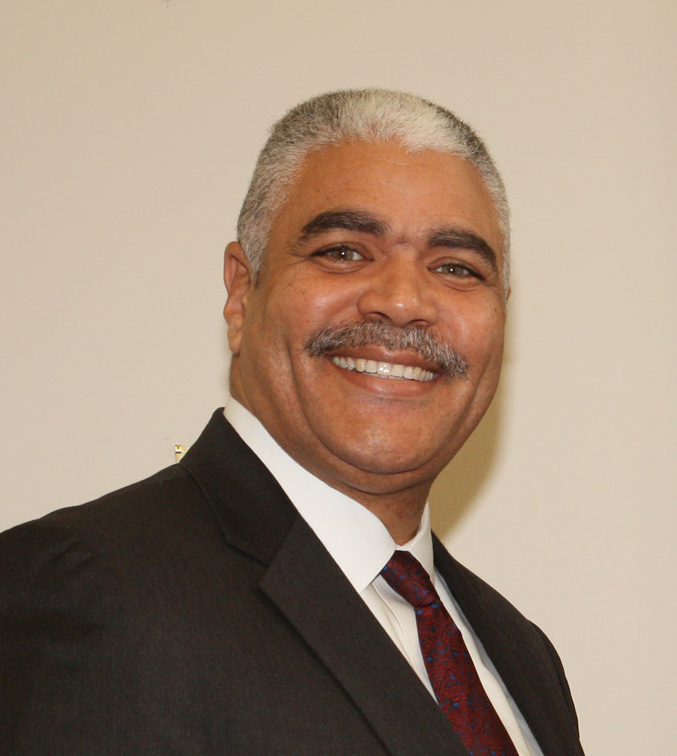

11th Premier of Bermuda
- In office 18 December 2012 – 19 May 2014
- Monarch: Elizabeth II
- Governor: George Fergusson
- Preceded by: Paula Cox
- Succeeded by: Michael Dunkley

Leader of the One Bermuda Alliance
- In office 10 September 2011 – May 2014
- Preceded by: John Barritt (Acting)
- Succeeded by: Michael Dunkley

Personal details
- Born: 1962 (age 63–64)
- Party: One Bermuda Alliance
- Spouse: Antoinette
- Children: 4
- Education: Towson State University

Craig Cannonier (born 1963) is a Bermudian politician, who served as Premier of Bermuda from 18 December 2012 until his resignation on 19 May 2014. He served as the leader of the One Bermuda Alliance from 10 September 2011 until his resignation in May 2014.

== Personal life ==
Cannonier was born and raised in St David's. He was educated at St George's Preparatory school and the Bermuda Institute. After obtaining his high school diploma, he attained a BSc in Industrial Psychology from Towson University in 1986.

== Career ==
Cannonier began his career at the MarketPlace Group where his responsibilities included human resources, training and purchasing. He also served as a general manager of a People's Drug pharmacy location for ten years, during which time he helped that location become an independently owned, rather than become part of CVS acquisition of 490 People's Drug stores. Prior to beginning his association with Esso Bermuda, Cannonier served as a relationship manager for Cable & Wireless. Mr. Craig Cannonier currently runs Esso City Tigermarket, Collector's Hill Esso and Warwick Esso.

In the wake of the "Jetgate" scandal, Cannonier resigned as Premier, with former UBP leader Michael Dunkley taking over the position.

Political offices
Preceded by Paula Cox	Premier of Bermuda; 2012–2014	Succeeded by Michael Dunkley
