= Michael Dunkley =

Bermudian politician

The Honourable Michael Dunkley CBE JP MP
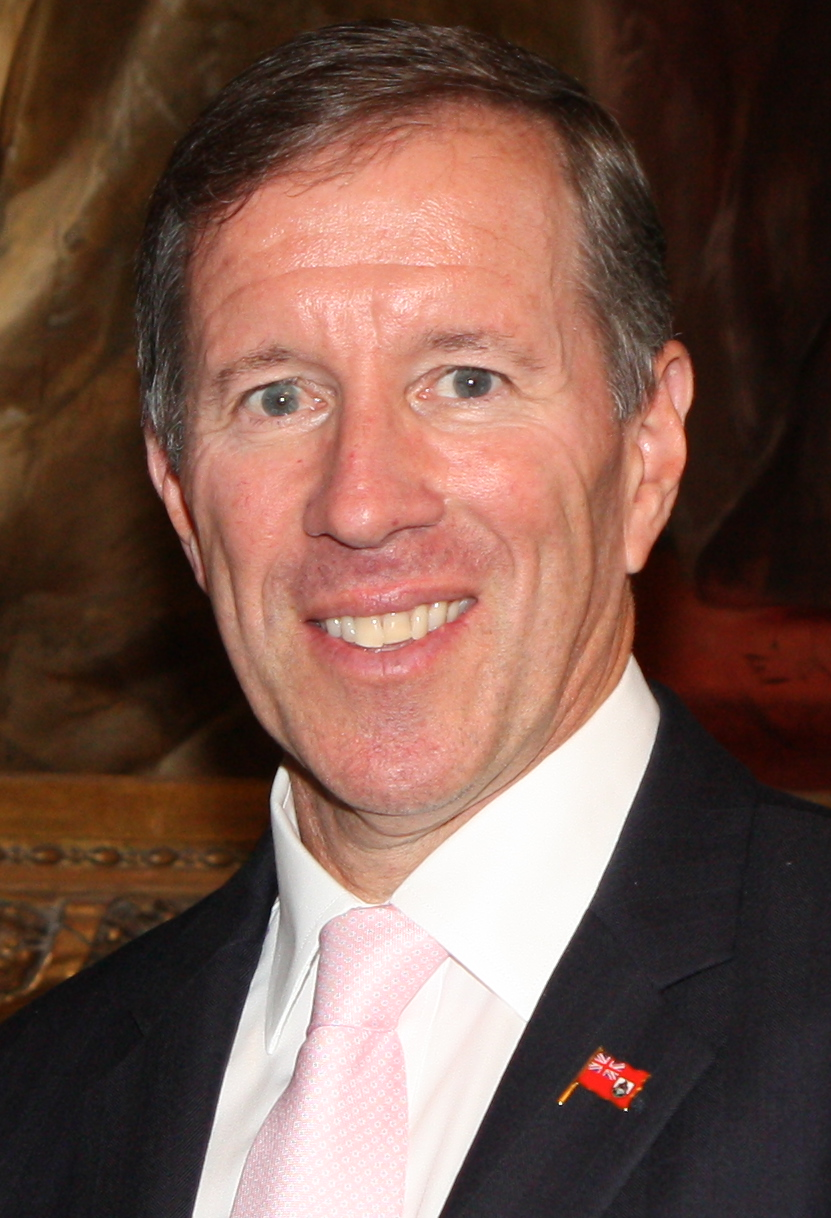

12th Premier of Bermuda
- In office 19 May 2014 – 19 July 2017
- Monarch: Elizabeth II
- Deputy: Everard T. (Bob) Richards (Retired 2017)
- Governor: George Fergusson; Ginny Ferson (Acting); John Rankin
- Preceded by: Craig Cannonier
- Succeeded by: Edward David Burt

Personal details
- Born: 18 June 1957 (age 69) Bermuda
- Party: One Bermuda Alliance
- Spouse: Pamela
- Children: Christine; Brooke
- Education: University of Richmond; George Washington University

Michael Henry Dunkley (born June 18, 1957) is a Bermudian politician and businessman who served as the 12th Premier of Bermuda from 2014 to 2017. He was an MP and member general of the One Bermuda Alliance political party and an active businessman on the island.

Dunkley served as Premier of Bermuda until his party, the One Bermuda Alliance (OBA), was defeated in a landslide victory for the Progressive Labour Party (PLP) on 18 July 2017. Dunkley resigned as leader of the OBA on 19 July 2017.

== Early life and education ==
Dunkley is the son of Henry "Bill" Harlow Dunkley (1929–1974) and Marye Lee Dunkley (née O'Dea). He was educated at Saltus Grammar School in Bermuda, Trinity College School in Port Hope, Ontario, Canada, and graduated from University of Richmond and George Washington University in 1980.

He first entered politics in 1997 with his election to The House of Assembly in Bermuda. On December 17, 2012, the One Bermuda Alliance won the general election and Dunkley was appointed the Deputy Premier and Minister of Public Safety. He has been often recognized by the Best of Bermuda Gold Awards published by the Bermudian Magazine for his work in politics and in 2007 was voted "Most Effective Politician."

As a businessman he is Vice President and Chief Executive Officer of Dunkley's Dairy, a milk processing plant and one of the island's largest food importers. Vice President of Island Properties Ltd, a property management company and is President of Dunkley's Management Holdings Ltd, a management consultant company.

On 19 July 2017, Michael Dunkley resigned as leader of the One Bermuda Alliance party, after having called a snap election and losing the election.

== Personal life ==
On 23 May 1982, he married Pamela and had 2 daughters (Christine and Brooke) with her. Christine married Kyle Dailey. Brooke married John Nixon. They also have a family French Bulldog named Coconut, who has over 1,000 Instagram followers.
