= Paula Cox =

10th Premier of Bermuda

The Honourable Paula Cox
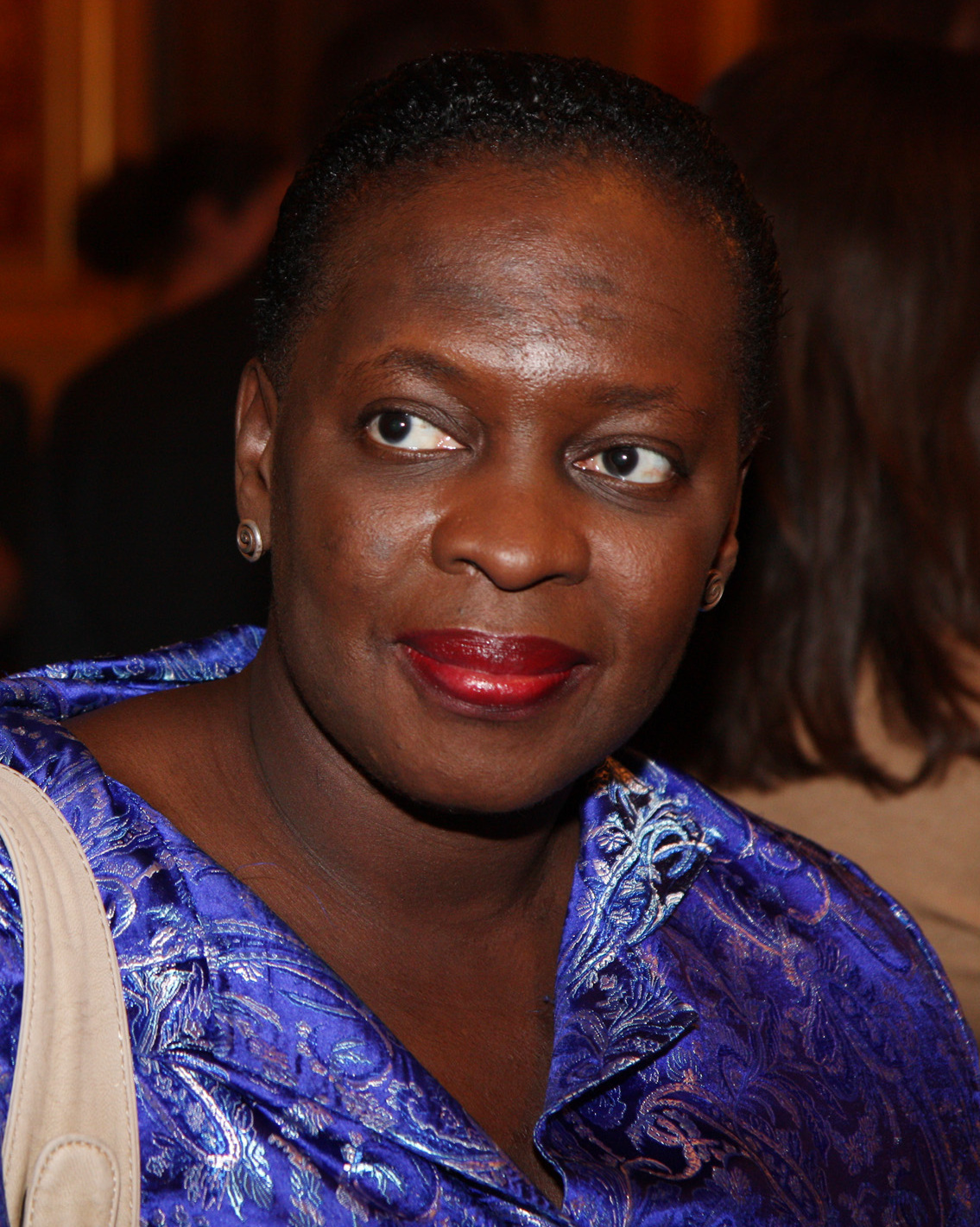
- Cox in 2010

10th Premier of Bermuda
- In office 29 October 2010 – 18 December 2012
- Monarch: Elizabeth II
- Governor: Richard Gozney; David Arkley (Acting); George Fergusson
- Preceded by: Ewart Brown
- Succeeded by: Craig Cannonier

Leader of the Progressive Labour Party
- In office 28 October 2010 – 21 December 2012
- Preceded by: Ewart Brown
- Succeeded by: Marc Bean

Personal details
- Born: Hamilton, Bermuda
- Party: Progressive Labour Party
- Education: McGill University; University of Manchester

Paula Ann Cox CBE is a Bermudian politician and former premier of Bermuda. She was the leader of the Bermuda Progressive Labour Party (PLP), from October 2010 to December 2012. In accordance with the Bermuda Constitution Order 1968, she was appointed Premier of Bermuda, on Friday, 29 October 2010 by Governor Sir Richard Gozney. She was succeeded as Premier by Craig Cannonier on 18 December 2012, when she led her party into election defeat, losing her own seat in the process.

== Early years ==
Paula Cox, the only daughter born to Bermudians C. Eugene and Alinda F. Cox, spent her early years living in Sandys Parish. She attended The Berkeley Institute and Havergal College. She later earned a Bachelor of Arts in political science from McGill University in Canada, and a post-graduate diploma in international law from the University of Manchester. She trained as a solicitor at the College of Law, Chancery Lane, London, and was called to the Bermuda Bar in January 1992. She received an honorary doctorate in education at the May 2004 commencement exercise of Wheelock College (USA) and more recently, in 2009, was made an honorary alumnus of Dalhousie University.

== Political life ==
Cox was first elected to Parliament in October 1996 when she won the Devonshire North by-election (Constituency 14). A seat formally held by the then Opposition Leader, L. Frederick Wade, JP, MP. Then in her mid-30s, Mrs. Cox became one of the youngest members of the House of Assembly.

Following the General Election in November 1998, Cox was appointed the first PLP Minister of Labour, Home Affairs and Public Safety. Her management of that portfolio gained her added recognition when she was judged "the most effective politician" in the Best of Bermuda Gold Awards for 2001 by The Bermudian, a prestigious and long-standing magazine in Bermuda. This achievement was then repeated in 2003.

On 1 November 2001, Cox was given a new assignment and appointed the Minister of Education and Development and was later that year named in the Bermudians' Best of Bermuda Gold annual listing as the most effective politician for 2001. Following the July 2003 general election, Cox retained her Education portfolio but was additionally appointed Attorney-General following the retirement of the iconic former leader of the BPLP, former member of parliament and former Attorney-General and Minister of Justice, Dame Lois Browne-Evans. Cox served in this dual portfolio until January 2004. In 2003, she was again cited in The Bermudian′s Best of Gold's annual listing as the most effective politician.

Cox assumed the Finance portfolio exclusively in January 2004, succeeding her late father, the Hon. C. Eugene Cox, CBE, JP, MP. She and her father were unique in Bermuda and party politics in both being Ministers in the first PLP administration and the only serving father-daughter duo in Parliament.

=== IPOC International Growth Fund affair ===
On a tip by Mikhail Fridman's Alfa Group, she investigated the financial activities of Leonid Reiman, his attorney Jeffrey Galmond, and their firms including the $1 billion Bermuda-based IPOC International Growth Fund which was competing against Alfa Group for the former share held by Leonid Rozhetskin's LV Finance in the Russian telecom giant Megafon. In March 2004, she hired two inspectors from the Financial Advisory Services division of KPMG to independently investigate IPOC International Growth Fund for irregularities and report the findings to the Bermund Monetary Authorities (BMA). To influence the outcome of KPMG's findings, Alfa Group's telecom subsidiary Altimo hired the Haley Barbour founded BGR public relations firm which then hired a security firm co-founded by Richard Burt Due Diligence. In addition to being a board member of Alfa, Richard Burt has a close working relationship with Mikhail Fridman. From spring to October 2005, Due Diligence performed its Project Yucca which infiltrated KPMG's investigation to gain information about the investigation into the IPOC International Growth Fund by impersonating British Secret Services agents.

== Cabinet appointments ==
Premier of Bermuda, October 2010 – December 2012
Minister of Finance, 2004–12
Attorney General, 2003–04
Minister of Education, 2001–04
Minister of Labour, Home Affairs and Public Safety, 1998–2001

Cox was appointed Commander of the Order of the British Empire (CBE) in the 2014 Birthday Honours for public service in Bermuda.

== Corporate life ==
Paula A. Cox is a corporate lawyer, having served as a lawyer for ACE Limited as their Corporate Counsel and previously as Vice-President and Senior Legal Counsel of Global Funds Services at the Bank of Bermuda Limited.

== Personal life ==
Cox is married to businessman Germain Nkeuleu, with whom she has a son, Stephan. She has two brothers, Jeremy Cox, chief executive officer of the Bermuda Monetary Authority, and Robert Cox, an electrical engineer presently working in the United States. Paula Cox is an avid reader of international biographies and collector of African antiquities.

Political offices
Preceded by Ewart Brown	Premier of Bermuda; 2010–12	Succeeded by Craig Cannonier
