= John Barritt =

Bermudian politician and businessman

John Barritt, Sr.

Personal details
- Born: 14 February 1916 Bermuda
- Died: 13 May 2014 (aged 98) Bermuda
- Spouse: Hilary Pantry
- Children: 2 sons, 2 daughters
- Occupation: Politician, businessman

Frederick John Barritt CBE (14 February 1916 – 13 May 2014) was a Bermudian politician and businessman. He served as the Speaker of the House of Assembly of Bermuda from 1979 to 1989. Besides this, he served more than three decades in Bermudian politics, serving as Deputy Speaker and Minister of Transportation during his time in politics.

He graduated from Saltus Grammar School, also serving a storied business career. From 1933 to 1970, he was with Powell and Company, serving as the managing director until the company was acquired by Purvis Limited.

He died on 13 May 2014. His son stated that he had suffered from Alzheimer's disease later in his life.

== See also ==
- List of speakers of the House of Assembly of Bermuda
