= One Bermuda Alliance =

- Leader: Ben Smith
- Chairperson: William Soares
- Founded: 17 May 2011
- Merger of: United Bermuda Party; Bermuda Democratic Alliance
- Headquarters: Reid Street, Hamilton, Bermuda
- Ideology: Fiscal conservatism Direct democracy Reformism
- Political position: Centre-right
- Slogan: Putting Bermuda first
- Senate: 3 / 11
- Assembly: 11 / 36

Website
- www.oba.bm

The One Bermuda Alliance (OBA) is one of two political parties in Bermuda with elected members of the Bermuda's legislative assembly. It was created in May 2011 by the merger of most members of Bermuda's two non-Labour parties, the United Bermuda Party and the Bermuda Democratic Alliance. It won the 2012 election and governed until 2017. Since then, it has been the official opposition in Bermuda's House of Assembly (currently holding 11 of its 36 seats).

== History ==
The United Bermuda Party (UBP) was founded in 1964 and won every Bermuda election until 1998, when it lost to the Progressive Labour Party. The UBP remained the official opposition party until 2011.

The Bermuda Democratic Alliance (BDA) was formed in 2009 by breakaway members of the UBP that believed only a new party could win voters from the PLP. It contested one by-election in December 2010, coming in third behind the PLP and UBP, with the PLP retaining about the same support level that it had in the 2007 general election. Concern that vote-splitting among the two non-Labour parties would result in an easy victory for the PLP prompted the BDA and UBP to enter merger talks.

The initial intention of UBP and BDA negotiators was to formally merge the two parties, but when UBP leader Kim Swan sought an injunction to block the merger, seven sitting MPs of the UBP quit their former party and joined the three BDA members to become Bermuda's new official opposition on 17 May 2011.

The party held its inaugural leadership convention on 10 September 2011, where the former BDA leader, Senator Craig Cannonier, narrowly won the party leadership over challenger Everard T. (Bob) Richards. The party won the 2012 elections, taking 19 of the 36 seats in the House of Assembly.

Cannonier resigned party leadership on 19 May 2014, and Michael Dunkley became party leader and Premier. The party lost its parliamentary majority in March 2017 after two members left the party to become independents, and Dunkley called an election for 18 July 2017. The party lost 7 seats to the PLP, retaining 12 of the 36 seats, and prompting Dunkley to resign as party leader the following day. Jeanne Atherden became the new leader but resigned in September 2018 after internal dissension, with Craig Cannonier returning as leader.

After the party retained only 6 seats in the 2020 Bermudian general election, Cannonier resigned as party leader in October 2020. N.H. Cole Simons was later sworn in as party leader on 2 November 2020, having been the only candidate for the role and remained in post until August 2023. Jarion Richardson was later sworn in as party leader on 10 August 2023.

In the February 2025 general election, the One Bermuda Alliance was defeated by the Progressive Labour Party, though the OBA gained three additional seats. In July 2025, Jarion Richardson announced his intention to step down as party leader at the annual conference.

The annual conference was held on 6 September 2025. The leadership race attracted the largest turnout of OBA members since the party's formation. Deputy Leader Ben Smith was defeated by newcomer Robert King, who was elected as the new party leader.

On 5 February 2026, OBA MPs delivered a motion of no confidence in King to the Governor. This was ratified by caucus on 6 February, making Ben Smith the Leader of the Party and His Majesty's Official Opposition.

== Policies ==
The party's initial slogan was "Putting Bermuda First." Its policies on its foundation included:

- balancing the budget in its first term
- cutting Ministerial pay by at least 10%
- allocating more government contracts to small business
- additional resources for police
- introducing a fully integrated technical curriculum and a longer school day
- having fixed term elections, right to petition for referendums and recall of MPs.

== Party leaders ==
Leader	Entered office	Left office
John Barritt (interim)	May 2011	September 2011
Craig Cannonier	September 2011	May 2014
Michael Dunkley	May 2014	July 2017
Patricia Gordon-Pamplin (interim)	July 2017	November 2017
Jeanne Atherden	November 2017	September 2018
Craig Cannonier	September 2018	October 2020
N.H. Cole Simons	November 2020	August 2023
Jarion Richardson	August 2023	September 2025
Robert King	September 6, 2025	February 6, 2026
Ben Smith	February 6, 2026	Present

== Election results ==
Election	Party leader	Votes			Seats			Position	Government
Election	Party leader	No.	%	±	No. of candidates	No. of seats won	±	Position	Government
2012	Craig Cannonier	15,949	51.70%	—	36	19 / 36	—	1st	OBA
2017	Michael Dunkley	13,837	40.62%	▼11.06	36	12 / 36	▼7	▼2nd	PLP
2020	Craig Cannonier	8,314	32.27%	▼8.34	36	6 / 36	▼6	2nd	PLP
2025	Jarion Richardson	9,133	36.86%	▲4.59	36	11 / 36	▲5	2nd	PLP
