= Gloria McPhee =

Bermudian politician

Gloria Juanita McPhee OBE (née Darrell; 10 November 1926 – 18 February 2007) was a Bermudian politician who served as a member of the House of Assembly from 1968 to 1980, representing the United Bermuda Party (UBP). She was a government minister from 1968 to 1977, the first woman appointed to the ministry.

McPhee was educated in the United States, attending Howard University in Washington, D.C., where she met and married a Bahamian student, George McPhee. She had initially wanted to be a dentist, but instead trained as a laboratory technician and worked at her husband's medical practice in Hamilton. McPhee was active in the community, and in 1966 was recruited by the UBP as one of its first two female candidates, along with Pearl Adderley. At the 1968 election, the first to be held under universal suffrage, she was elected to the two-member Hamilton West constituency alongside John Stubbs, another UBP member; one of their defeated opponents was Walter Robinson, the leader of the Progressive Labour Party (PLP).

After the 1968 election, McPhee was appointed Minister of Health and Social Affairs in the government of Henry Tucker – the first Bermudian woman appointed to cabinet. She was instead made Minister of Education and Libraries after the 1972 election, and Minister of Planning, House, and Environment after the 1976 election. In 1975, McPhee helped found the Black Caucus, a group of UBP members who felt that Black Bermudians were underrepresented in the party. She was critical of Premier John Sharpe, and in February 1977 issued a statement accusing him of "moving towards a dictatorial premiership" characterised by "indecisiveness" and "shortsightedness"; she and three allies resigned from cabinet later that month. She left politics at the 1980 election, and publicly endorsed the PLP candidate in her old seat. McPhee died in February 2007, aged 80. Her sister, Helene Brown, was also a member of parliament, and her nephew, Ewart Brown, served as premier from 2006 to 2010.
