= 2007 Bermudian general election =

- 18 December 2007

All 36 seats in the House of Assembly 19 seats needed for a majority
- Registered: 42,295
- Turnout: 75.87% (▲1.00pp)
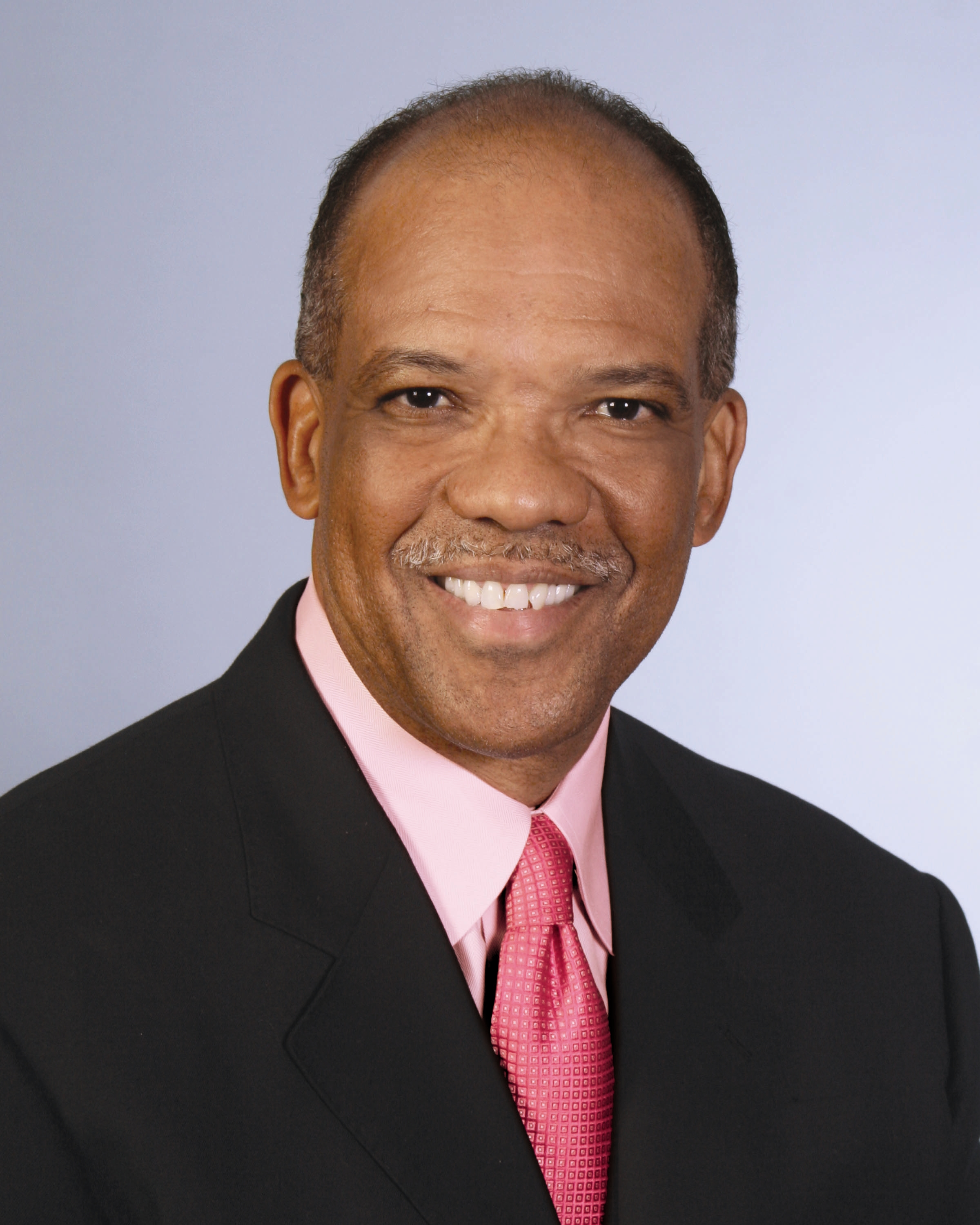

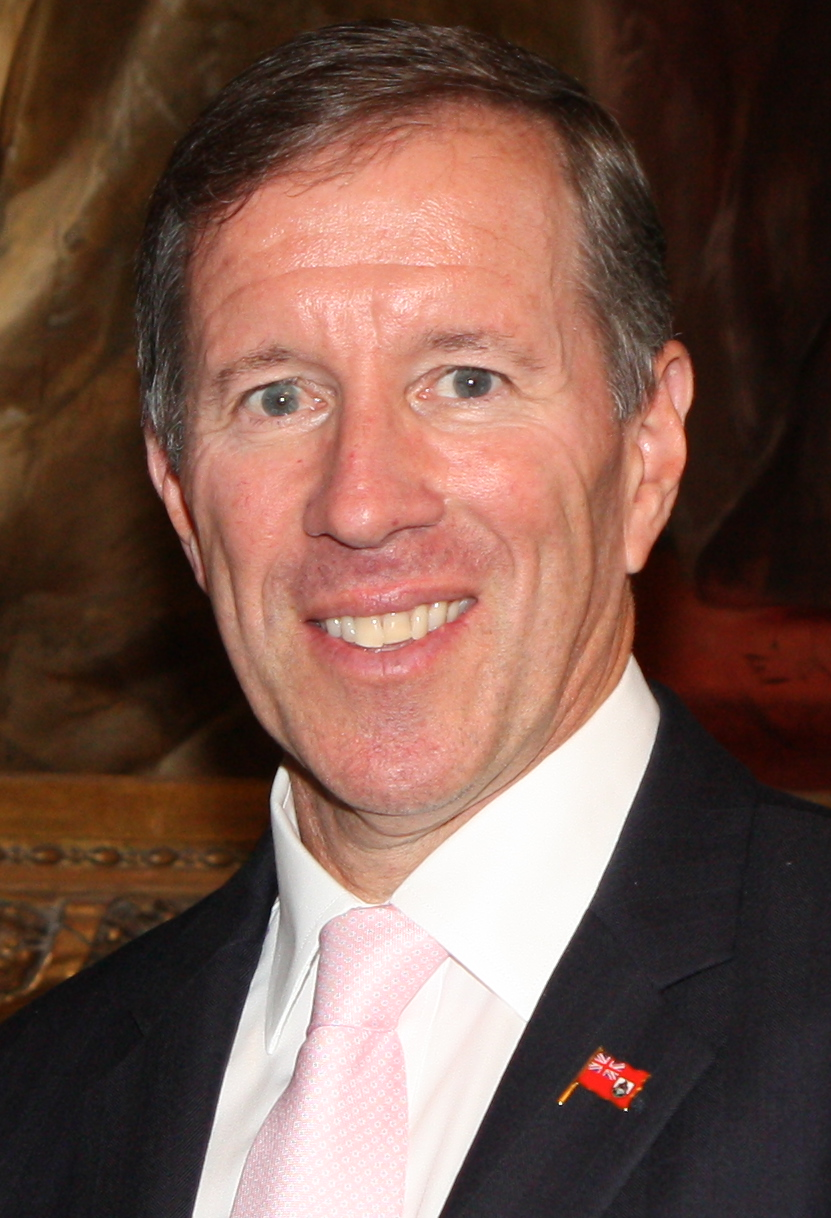
	First party	Second party
Leader	Ewart Brown	Michael Dunkley
Party	PLP	UBP
Last election	50.50%, 22 seats	49.13%, 14 seats
Seats won	22	14
Seat change	Steady	Steady
Popular vote	16,800	15,161
Percentage	52.45%	47.34%
Swing	▲1.95pp	▼1.79pp
- Results by constituency
Premier before election
Ewart Brown
PLP
Elected Premier
Ewart Brown
PLP

General elections were held in Bermuda on 18 December 2007 to elect all 36 members of the House of Assembly. The incumbent Progressive Labour Party (PLP) led by Ewart Brown was returned for a third term, with 22 of the 36 seats of the House of Assembly, with the opposition United Bermuda Party (UBP) winning the remaining 14 seats.

== Background ==
Bermuda gained internal self government with the introduction of a constitution in 1968 and for the first 30 years afterwards the United Bermuda Party was in power. Their domination was broken by defeat in the 1998 election leading to the Progressive Labour Party winning government for the first time. The PLP government was returned at the 2003 election, winning 22 seats compared to 14 seats for the United Bermuda Party.

Bermuda remains a British overseas territory; independence was rejected in a referendum in 1995. However, in 2004 the then Premier of Bermuda, called for a debate on independence to take place.

Ewart Brown became Premier in October 2006, defeating the incumbent, William Alexander Scott, in a contest for the leadership of PLP, while in March 2007 Michael Dunkley became leader of the opposition United Bermuda Party, ousting Wayne Furbert.

== Campaign ==
On 2 November 2007, Premier Brown announced that the election would be held on 18 December. Both main parties put up 36 candidates and there were two independent candidates. Altogether 42,337 people were registered to vote with each constituency having about 1,100 voters. An opinion poll in the summer had put the UBP on 40%, the PLP on 34% and 26% undecided. Analysts saw 7 of the 36 seats as likely to be close.

The incumbent PLP campaigned on the basis of their record where they said they had increased tourism and attracted development to Bermuda. They pledged that they would introduce free day care, bus and ferry transportation if they were re-elected. With Bermuda having a population that was 60% of African descent, the PLP said that votes for the UBP were a vote for white people. They used the example of two black people who had left the UBP earlier in the year after saying that the white elite was still in control of the party.

The election was seen as being partly contested on the performance of Premier Brown. The UBP described him as a polarizing figure and accused him of being involved in corruption. A police dossier had alleged there was corruption in the public housing corporation, but prosecutors said they could not find any evidence of illegality. The PLP, however, described their leader as "the man who gets things done".

The UBP criticised the PLP for having failed to create enough affordable housing and for their plans for enforcing racial equality in the workplace. A former UBP premier said that the PLP's plan to fine companies if they did not promote black people to senior posts could drive away many expatriates and companies from Bermuda. The UBP said that, if they were elected, they would give Bermudian status to everyone who had lived in Bermuda for more than 20 years, which the PLP said would be a mistake which could lead to 8,000 more Bermudians.

Also at issue in the election was both parties' policies over independence for Bermuda. Premier Brown was in favour of independence but his party said that this was just a long-term goal and that they would not use the election as the basis for a push for independence. The UBP said that they would hold a referendum if they won the election and said that Bermuda should not become independent unless there was clear support in a referendum. An opinion poll in 2007 had shown that around two-thirds of Bermudians were opposed to independence.

The campaign lasted six weeks, the longest ever in Bermuda, and was seen as being very bitter. Polls showed the election was tight with analysts saying that they expected the result to be close. During the campaign there was an incident when someone attempted to mail a bullet to Premier Brown, but it was intercepted by a postal worker, which led both parties to try to calm the campaign down.

== Results ==
The results of the election saw no change from the 2003 election with the Progressive Labour Party still winning 22 seats and the United Bermuda Party 14 seats. The leader of the United Bermuda Party, Michael Dunkley, failed to win election in Smith's North losing by 444 votes to 536. He had given up his safe seat of Devonshire East to try to overturn the United Bermuda Party's deficit by winning a marginal seat.

Party	Votes	%	Seats	+/–
Progressive Labour Party	16,800	52.45	22	0
United Bermuda Party	15,161	47.34	14	0
Independents	67	0.21	0	0
Total	32,028	100.00	36	0
Valid votes	32,028	99.81		
Invalid/blank votes	62	0.19		
Total votes	32,090	100.00		
Registered voters/turnout	42,295	75.87		
Source: Caribbean Elections
