= Politics of Bermuda =

Bermuda is the oldest British Overseas Territory, and the oldest self-governing British Overseas Territory, and has a great degree of internal autonomy through authority and roles of governance delegated to it by the national Government (the British Government, which is ultimately responsible for the governance of all British territory). Its parliament held its first session in 1620, making it the third-oldest continuous parliament in the world. As part of the British realm, King Charles III is head of state and is represented in Bermuda by a Governor, whom he appoints on the advice of the British Government. The Governor has special responsibilities in four areas: external affairs, defence, internal security, and policing.

Internally, Bermuda is a parliamentary representative democratic dependency. The premier is the head of government, and there is a multi-party system. The judiciary is independent of the executive and the legislature. Military defence is officially the responsibility of the sovereign government (the government of the United Kingdom), but various military forces have been raised under local legislation, including the current Royal Bermuda Regiment.

Bermuda is represented by British delegations in the UN and its related agencies. The United Nations Committee on Decolonisation includes Bermuda on the United Nations list of non-self-governing territories.

== History ==
The original system of government was created under the Virginia Company, which colonised Bermuda, accidentally in 1609, and deliberately from 1612. The Virginia Company lost its Royal Charter for its territory on the continent of North America ("Virginia") in 1622, and the Crown assumed responsibility for the administration of the continental colony. Bermuda, however, passed in 1615 to a new company (a Spin-off of the Virginia Company, described at the time as an under-company), The Somers Isles Company (The Somers Isles being the other official name of the colony), formed by the same shareholders.

The colonial government was established in 1612 with the arrival of the first Governor of Bermuda, Richard Moore. Moore was actually the Lieutenant-Governor, under the Governor of Virginia. The office would remain a Lieutenant-Governorship under an overseas Governor until the revocation of the Royal Charter of the Somers Isles Company in 1684 (and would continue to be termed as such until re-titled Governor of Bermuda in 1738). Moore was also instructed to appoint a Counsell of Six to assist in the governance of the colony. The original form of local government that developed was similar to that of a County in England and Wales, with a number of prominent men appointed to key roles, such as the judiciary, Secretary, and Sherriff. As the trans-Atlantic colonies were too distant from the political centre at London for the national government (the English Government) to easily fill its role as it did within counties of England and Wales, the (Lieutenant-) Governor was appointed to represent the English Government (and also the company) locally. The Governor was also appointed to fill the role performed in counties of England and Wales by the Lord-Lieutenant, in command of the local Militia (there being no standing English Army at that time), with this office titled Commander-in-Chief or Captain-General. The various appointed officers of the local government were also ex-officio members of the Council, a body that advised the Governor as the Privy Council of England advised the King, and that functioned as a Cabinet.

The elected House of Assembly was created in 1620 under that the Somers Isles Company, functioning as a Lower House of the Parliament of Bermuda with the Council acting as the Upper House until 1888, when the Council was split into an Executive Council (which later became the Cabinet) and a Legislative Council as the Upper House. As there was originally no Deputy Governor, the President of The Council could find himself temporarily acting as Governor in the event of the absence, incapacitation or death of the Governor (or during an interregnum, which occasionally resulted from a retiring Governor departing Bermuda before the arrival of his replacement) until the mid-19th Century, after which the senior military (army, rather than naval) officer in Bermuda assumed the role of Officer Administering the Government during the absence of the Governor.

Voting was originally restricted to males, but (unlike the franchise for the national House of Commons) there was no property qualification as virtually all private land in Bermuda belonged to absentees until the 1630s, when the falling profits of Bermudian tobacco led many of the Company's adventurers to sell their landholdings, usually to the agents or tenants who occupied them (a property qualification would ultimately be introduced to minimise the number of coloured and poor white islanders who could vote). When the numbers of non-white landowners began to increase, a minimum value was established for the properties which entitled their owners to vote. In 1960, this was £60. A man could vote in each parish in which he owned sufficiently valuable land – giving the richest whites as many as nine votes each if they so desired.

Since 1968 Bermuda has had a constitution that sets out its structure of government. The constitution provides the island with formal responsibility for internal self-government, while the British Government retains responsibility for external affairs, defence, and security. The Bermudian Government is always consulted on any international negotiations affecting the territory. Legislative power is vested in both the government and the Parliament. The party system is dominated by the Progressive Labour Party and the One Bermuda Alliance, while prior to 1998 it had been dominated by the United Bermuda Party.

== Executive branch ==
King Charles III, head of state of Bermuda

The Governor is appointed by the Monarch. The Governor invites the leader of largest party in Parliament to form a government as Premier. The premier is head of government and leader of the majority party in the elected House of Assembly. The Cabinet is composed of 14 members selected by the premier from among members of the bicameral parliament consisting of the nominated Senate and the House of Assembly.

The Governor appoints a number of senior government positions, including the puisne judges, police commissioner, the auditor general and the parliamentary registrar.

Office	Position	Name	Since
Monarch	King	Charles III	8 September 2022
King's Representative	Governor and Commander-in-Chief	Andrew Murdoch	23 January 2025

=== Cabinet ===
Following the 2025 Bermudian general election, a new cabinet was appointed:

Portfolio	Minister
Premier and Minister of Finance	David Burt
Minister of Economy & Labour	Jason Hayward
Minister of Legal Affairs and Attorney General	Kim Wilkerson
Minister of Tourism & Transport, Culture and Sport	Owen Darrell
Minister of Home Affairs	Alexa Lightbourne
Minister of Public Works & Environment	Jache Adams
Minister of Health	Kim Wilson
Minister of Housing and Municipalities	Zane DeSilva
Minister of Education	Crystal Caesar
Minister of the Cabinet Office & Digital Innovation	Diallo Robain
Minister of National Security	Michael Weeks
Minister of Youth, Social Development, and Seniors	Tinee Furbert
Junior Minister of Finance	Wayne Furbert
Junior Minister for Youth, Social Development and Seniors, Home Affairs, and National Security	Lindsay Simmons
Junior Minister for the Cabinet Office & Digital Innovation, and Public Works and Environment	Mischa Fubler
Junior Minister for Health, Economy & Labour, and Housing & Municipalities	Lauren Bell
Junior Minister for Justice	Dennis Lister III

Until 2025
Portfolio	Minister
Premier and Minister of Finance	David Burt
Deputy Premier and Minister of Transport	Walter Roban
Minister of Legal Affairs and Attorney General	Kathy Simmons
Minister of Economic Development and Tourism	Jamahl Simmons
Minister of Home Affairs	Walton Brown
Minister of Public Works	Col. David Burch
Minister of Health	Kim Wilson
Minister of Social Development & Sports	Zane DeSilva
Minister of Education	Diallo Robain
Minister of National Security	Renee Ming
Minister of Government Reform	Lovitta Foggo

== Legislative branch ==
The Parliament has two chambers: the House of Assembly and the Senate. The House of Assembly was originally composed of 40 members from 20 electoral districts (two representatives from each district) for a term not to exceed 5 years. As the districts, based on the old parish boundaries, contained significantly differing numbers of voters (malapportionment), that body was replaced in 2002 with a 36-member House elected from single-seat electoral districts of roughly equal population for a five-year term. The Senate, called the Legislative Council until 1980, is the revising chamber and serves concurrently with the House of Assembly. There are 11 senators: five appointed by the governor in consultation with the premier; three in consultation with the Leader of the Opposition; and three at the governor's discretion.

== Political parties and elections ==
The latest election results for the House of Assembly are as follows:

Party	Votes	%	Seats	+/–
Progressive Labour Party	12,300	49.64	25	–5
One Bermuda Alliance	9,133	36.86	11	+5
Free Democratic Movement	949	3.83	0	0
Emperial Group	116	0.47	0	New
Independents	2,281	9.21	0	0
Total	24,779	100.00	36	0
Valid votes	24,779	100.00		
Invalid/blank votes	0	0.00		
Total votes	24,779	100.00		
Registered voters/turnout	45,064	54.99		
Source: Parliamentary Registry

== Judicial branch ==
The Magistrates' Court is a creature of statute. Its jurisdiction includes: adjudicating on small claims in civil matters, dealing with a number of regulatory applications, trial of summary criminal offences and serving as examining justices on indictable matters (that is, determining if there is sufficient evidence to commit a criminal suspect for trial on indictment in the Supreme Court).

The Supreme Court has inherent original jurisdiction for most civil matters, with concurrent jurisdiction in common law and equity. The Supreme Court also deals with trials on indictment (that is, the most serious criminal matters). The Supreme Court can judicially review government action in accordance with the principles of Administrative Law and entertain petitions that laws or public acts are contrary to the Constitution of Bermuda. It also has appellate jurisdiction on matters from the Magistrates' Court.

The Court of Appeal has appellate jurisdiction on matters from the Supreme Court.

The Judicial Committee of the Privy Council is the final court on all matters from Bermuda.

== Administrative divisions ==
Bermuda has two municipal subnational entities: the city of Hamilton and the town of St. George. There are also nine traditional parishes, but these have no administrative or legal role. When Bermuda was first colonised, the territory was divided between eight primary landowners (the shareholders of the Bermuda Company) in equal allotments, and public land (St. George's); these divisions, then called "Tribes", came to be known as "Parishes". Until the late 20th century, the parishes maintained their own community councils responsible for such functions as birth records. Today, the Bermuda parishes are as follows:

1. Sandys
2. Southampton
3. Warwick
4. Paget
5. Pembroke
6. Devonshire
7. Smith's
8. Hamilton
9. St. George's

== International organization participation ==
Caricom (associate), CCC, ICFTU, Interpol (subbureau), IOC

== Political conditions ==
Bermuda's first political party, the Progressive Labour Party (PLP), was formed in February 1963 with predominantly black and working class adherents. Its leadership quickly became dominated by West Indian Bermudians (the 20th century had seen considerable immigration from the West Indies, resulting in profound social and political changes in Bermuda). In 1965, the two-party system was launched with the formation of the United Bermuda Party (UBP), which had the support of the majority of white voters and of some blacks. A third party, the Bermuda Democratic Alliance (BDA) (not to be confused with a party of the same name founded in 2009), was formed in the summer of 1967 with a splinter group from the PLP as a nucleus; it disbanded in 1970. It was later replaced by the National Liberal Party (NLP) which contested elections until 2003 with no success.

Bermuda's first election held on the basis of universal adult suffrage and equal voting took place on 22 May 1968; previously, the franchise had been limited to property owners and those above the age of 21. Persons who owned land in one or more parishes could vote in each parish. In the 1968 election, the UBP won 30 House of Assembly seats, while the PLP won 10 and the BDP lost the three seats it had previously held. The UBP continued to maintain control of the government, although by decreasing margins in the Assembly, until 1998 when the PLP won the general election for the first time with 54% of the popular vote and a 24-seat majority in the 40-member Assembly. The PLP would succeed gaining a second term in July 2003, although by a reduced majority of 52% margin of the popular vote and 22 seats in a new 36-seat Assembly. A leadership battle followed the election, resulting in the PLP's first Premier, Jennifer M. Smith (now Dame Jennifer) being ousted with William Alexander Scott chosen as new Party Leader and later Premier. In December 2007, after an October 2006 party leadership change in which Ewart F. Brown, Jr. became Premier, the PLP gained a third term by maintaining a 52% margin of the popular vote and 22 out of 36 seats in the Assembly. Paula Cox replaced Brown as leader of the PLP, and therefore the Premier, in October 2010.

Unsatisfied aspirations, particularly among young blacks, led to a brief civil disturbance in December 1977, following the execution of two men found guilty of the 1972–73 assassinations of Governor Sir Richard Sharples and four others. In the 1980s, the increasing prosperity of Bermudians, combined with limited land area, caused severe pressure in housing. Despite a general strike in 1981 and poor economic conditions worldwide during 1981–83, Bermuda's social, political, and economic institutions showed resilience and stability.

Bermuda's positive experience with internal self-government has led to discussions of possible complete independence by both parties. However, an independence referendum called by a sharply divided UBP in the summer of 1995 was resoundingly defeated and resulted in the resignation of the Premier and UBP leader, Sir John Swan. Just over 58% of the electorate voted in the independence referendum, which had to be postponed one day due to disruptions caused by Hurricane Felix in 1995. Of those voting, over 73% voted against independence, while only 25% voted in favour. The vote may not have been a true test of support for independence, however, as the Progressive Labour Party (PLP) urged its membership and supporters to boycott the referendum. The PLP stated that the unwillingness of the UBP government to put forward a plan of substantive constitutional reform made it impossible for it to support the referendum.

This was despite independence having been one of the PLP's central principles since the party's inception in 1963. In 1968, the PLP election platform stated that, "No government can be either responsible or democratic while under the rule of another country. Colonialism is a cancer....Therefore we shall return to London to examine with the British Government what arrangements can be made for our independence."

Despite the previous emphasis, any mention of independence was absent from the PLP's general election platform both in 1998, when the PLP first triumphed at the polls, and again in 2003. In fact, Premier Jennifer M. Smith stated that she would not pursue independence during her first term. Again, in 2001, she made the following statement: "As I have stated repeatedly, consistently and unequivocally since assuming the leadership of the Bermuda Progressive Labour Party, I shall state once again for the record – independence is not an issue that we will address in our first term and probably not in our second term....We believe that there are a number of areas that need addressing before Bermuda heads down this road."

Under the leadership of Smith, the Government of Bermuda began to systematically address the issues that it believes are fundamental prerequisites for independence. It very quickly enacted legislation providing for the elimination of annual voter registration. In 2001, the government began taking steps to amend Bermuda's constitution in order to abolish the island's system of parish-based, dual-seat constituencies which favored voters in parishes of small, predominantly white populations. The British Foreign and Commonwealth Office (FCO) prepared an Order in Council empowering the Constituency Boundaries Commission to recommend to the governor the number and boundaries of single-member constituencies into which Bermuda should be divided. The Commission held meetings with the public and concluded its deliberations. The governor then submitted the commission's report to the UK's Secretary of State for Foreign and Commonwealth Affairs, together with the views of the House of Assembly. Finally, the FCO prepared a second Order in Council for presentation to the Privy Council to effect the proposals made by the commission, including constitutional amendments relating to electoral boundaries and representation.

The possibility of independence has relevance to newly enacted UK legislation entitling citizens of Britain's Overseas Territories, including Bermuda, to British citizenship. The British's Overseas Territories Act, passed in February 2002, provides automatic acquisition of British citizenship, including automatic transmission of citizenship to their children; the right of abode, including the right to live and work in Britain; and the right not to exercise or to formally renounce British citizenship.

A poll conducted by the Bermuda Sun, a local semiweekly newspaper, reveals support for British citizenship—however, that support largely comes from whites and the majority of blacks in the island—that is, Bermuda's majority—are not interested in British citizenship, opting rather to live and study in North America. The March 2002 poll revealed that of the 356 persons surveyed, 66.9% were interested in accepting British citizenship, and only 18% said that they would refuse it. However, the poll has come under much controversy recently, with some saying the data and focus are grossly inaccurate. There are no conditions attached to the granting of British citizenship to the Overseas Territories, a fact of particular importance to Bermuda where the issue of independence lies dormant. The white paper specifically states, "The new grant of British citizenship will not be a barrier, therefore, to those Overseas Territories choosing to become independent of Britain....Our Overseas Territories are British for as long as they wish to remain British. Britain has willingly granted independence where it has been requested; and we will continue to do so where this is an option."

There is a Bermuda Independence Commission , and it has published reports and papers to address issues related to independence.

Bermuda electoral politics has been characterized by single-party dominance: the UBP was the dominant party from 1968 to 1998, winning every election; while the PLP has continuously been in power since 1998. The formation of the opposition One Bermuda Alliance from a merger of the Bermuda Democratic Alliance and most members of the UBP was driven by polls showing that the PLP would easily win a fourth straight term if they faced either the UBP or BDA in an election.

== Notable political figures ==
- Sir Henry James "Jack" Tucker (1903 in Bermuda – 1986) was the first Government Leader of Bermuda, serving from 1968 to 1971
- Norma Cox Astwood OBE (born c.1930 in Bermuda) is a Bermudian clinical psychologist. She was the first woman to serve as vice president of the Senate of Bermuda. She lives in Barbados and works as a consultant with the Caribbean Dyslexia Centre
- Clarence James CBE (1931 in Bermuda – 2016 in Bermuda) was a surgeon and politician. He was a member of the House of Assembly of Bermuda
- Sir John William David Swan KBE (born 1935 in Bermuda) is a former Bermudian political figure, a real estate developer and a philanthropist. He served as Premier of Bermuda from 1982 to 1995
- Ewart Frederick Brown, Jr (born 1946 in Bermuda) was the ninth Premier of Bermuda and former leader of the Progressive Labour Party (PLP) from 2006 to 2010. He was the Member of Parliament for Warwick South Central from 1993 to 2010.
