= Yvette Swan =

Bermudian international organization executive, politician, and optician (1945–2021)

Yvette Swan (Fair Use only)

Yvette Victoria Angela Swan (20 August 1945 – 18 April 2021) was a Bermudian senator for the United Bermuda Party, optician, and pastor, as well as president of International Federation of Business and Professional Women and Project 5-0.

== Biography ==
Born in Saint Thomas Parish, Jamaica to two schoolteachers, she went to study at Paddington Technical College in London and Aston University in Birmingham, studying optometry. Swan would then move to Bermuda with her husband Malcolm, working there as an optometrist. She was appointed as a senator for the United Bermuda Party in 1993, having been a campaigner for the party in Warwick West, she was later made Minister of Community and Cultural Affairs in 1995. She would also serve as Minister for Women's Issues, and addressed the United Nations Commission on the Status of Women. She made two bids for the House of Assembly, one in 1998, running in Warwick West with Quinton Edness, the other in 2003, in Warwick North Central, both bids were unsuccessful. She was also president of the International Federation of Business and Professional Women, and Project 5-0.

Swan would later move to Canada, studying Theology and earning her Masters in Divinity at the Atlantic School of Theology. She would go on to become a minister at St. Paul's United Church, in Riverview, New Brunswick, and in 2015 was ordained by the Maritime Conference. Swan spent the last seven years of her life serving the Nashwaak Pastoral Charge.

Bermudian Leader of the Opposition Cole Simons, a member of the One Bermuda Alliance which formed as a merger between the United Bermuda Party and the Bermuda Democratic Alliance, described Swan as "a woman of great passion and dedication, who served tirelessly at various levels of society".
