= 1980 Bermudian general election =

- 11 December 1980
- All 40 seats in the House of Assembly; 21 seats needed for a majority
- Turnout: 79.84% (▼4.46pp)
Party	Leader	Vote %	Seats	+/–
UBP	David Gibbons	53.89	22	−4
PLP	Lois Browne-Evans	46.02	18	+4
This lists parties that won seats. See the complete results below.
Premier before	Premier after
David Gibbons; UBP	David Gibbons; UBP

General elections were held in Bermuda on 11 December 1980. The result was a victory for the United Bermuda Party, which won 22 of the 40 seats.

== Electoral system ==
The 40 members of the House of Assembly were elected in 20 two-member constituencies. Voters had two votes, with the two candidates with the highest vote number being elected.

== Results ==
Of the 30,981 registered voters, 24,736 cast valid votes. In 18 constituencies both elected members were from the same party, whilst two constituencies elected one member of the United Bermuda Party and one from the Progressive Labour Party.

Party	Votes	%	Seats	+/–
United Bermuda Party	26,292	53.89	22	–4
Progressive Labour Party	22,452	46.02	18	+4
Independents	42	0.09	0	New
Total	48,786	100.00	40	0
Total votes	24,736	–		
Registered voters/turnout	30,981	79.84		
Source: Parliamentary Registry
