= 1989 Bermudian general election =

- 9 February 1989
- All 40 seats in the House of Assembly; 21 seats needed for a majority
- Turnout: 74.32% (▲8.11pp)
Party	Leader	Vote %	Seats	+/–
UBP	John Swan	50.00	23	−8
PLP	L. Frederick Wade	36.71	15	+8
NLP	Gilbert Darrell	9.84	1	−1
Independents	–	3.46	1	+1
This lists parties that won seats. See the complete results below.
Premier before	Premier after
John Swan; UBP	John Swan; UBP

General elections were held in Bermuda on 9 February 1989. The result was a victory for the United Bermuda Party, which won 23 of the 40 seats in the House of Assembly.

== Electoral system ==
The 40 members of the House of Assembly were elected in 20 two-member constituencies. Voters had two votes, with the two candidates with the highest vote number being elected.

== Results ==
Party	Votes	%	Seats	+/–
United Bermuda Party	21,174	50.00	23	–8
Progressive Labour Party	15,548	36.71	15	+8
National Liberal Party	4,166	9.84	1	–1
Independents	1,464	3.46	1	+1
Total	42,352	100.00	40	0
Total votes	23,160	–		
Registered voters/turnout	31,162	74.32		
Source: Parliamentary Registry
