= 1976 Bermudian general election =

- 18 May 1976
- All 40 seats in the House of Assembly; 21 seats needed for a majority
- Turnout: 84.30% (▲7.40pp)
Party	Leader	Vote %	Seats	+/–
UBP	John Sharpe	55.48	26	−4
PLP	Lois Browne-Evans	44.43	14	+4
This lists parties that won seats. See the complete results below.
Premier before	Premier after
John Sharpe; UBP	John Sharpe; UBP

General elections were held in Bermuda on 18 May 1976. The ruling United Bermuda Party remained in power after winning 26 of the 40 seats in the House of Assembly, with the opposition Progressive Labour Party gaining three seat, giving it a total of fourteen.

== Electoral system ==
The 40 members of the House of Assembly were elected in 20 two-member constituencies. Voters had two votes, with the two candidates with the highest vote number being elected.

== Results ==
Party	Votes	%	Seats	+/–
United Bermuda Party	20,512	55.48	26	–4
Progressive Labour Party	16,426	44.43	14	+4
Independents	33	0.09	0	New
Total	36,971	100.00	40	0
Total votes	19,466	–		
Registered voters/turnout	23,091	84.30		
Source: The Royal Gazette
