= 1985 Bermudian general election =

- 29 October 1985
- All 40 seats in the House of Assembly; 21 seats needed for a majority
- Turnout: 66.21% (▼14.45pp)
Party	Leader	Vote %	Seats	+/–
UBP	John Swan	62.50	31	+5
PLP	Lois Browne-Evans	30.54	7	−7
NLP	Gilbert Darrell	6.95	2	New
This lists parties that won seats. See the complete results below.
Premier before	Premier after
John Swan; UBP	John Swan; UBP

General elections were held in Bermuda on 29 October 1985. The result was a victory for the United Bermuda Party, which won 31 of the 40 seats in the House of Assembly.

A total of 98 candidates contested the election, although one seat, Southampton West, was uncontested and the two United Bermuda Party candidates returned unopposed.

== Electoral system ==
The 40 members of the House of Assembly were elected in 20 two-member constituencies. Voters had two votes, with the two candidates with the highest vote number being elected.

== Results ==
Party	Votes	%	Seats	+/–
United Bermuda Party	22,368	62.50	31	+5
Progressive Labour Party	10,930	30.54	7	–7
National Liberal Party	2,486	6.95	2	New
Independents	5	0.01	0	New
Total	35,789	100.00	40	0
Total votes	19,427	–		
Registered voters/turnout	29,340	66.21		
Source: Parliamentary Registry
