= Helene Darrell Brown =

Bermudian politician

Member of the Parliament of Bermuda
- Incumbent
- Assumed office 1972
- Constituency: Hamilton East

Personal details
- Political party: United Bermuda Party
- Relatives: Gloria McPhee (sister); Ewart Brown (son)
- Occupation: School teacher, politician

Helene Darrell Brown is a Bermudian former politician. Elected in 1972, she was a member of the parliament of Bermuda for the United Bermuda Party for the constituency of Hamilton East.

Helene Darrell's sister was Gloria McPhee, Bermuda's first female Cabinet Minister. Darrell married Ewart D.A. Brown, and their son Ewart Brown, born May 17, 1946, in Flatts Village, became a doctor and Prime Minister of Bermuda.

Darrell Brown, originally a school teacher, has said that her political involvement was inspired by meeting United States Congresswoman Shirley Chisholm, whom Darrell Brown felt set an example for the impact women could have on their communities by serving in politics. Elected in 1972, Darrell Brown served in parliament alongside her sister McPhee, a first in Bermuda. Darrell Brown served as Chairman of the Health and Welfare Committee. She was also a member of the Women's Civic and Political Association as well as Secretary for the United Bermuda Party in Hamilton West.
