= David Gibbons (politician) =

Bermudian politician and businessman (1927–2014)

The Honourable Sir David Gibbons
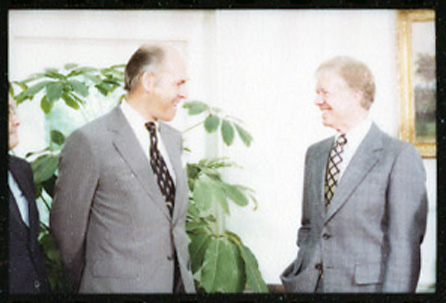
- Gibbons with President Jimmy Carter in 1980

3rd Premier of Bermuda
- In office 30 August 1977 – 15 January 1982
- Monarch: Elizabeth II
- Preceded by: John Sharpe
- Succeeded by: John Swan

Minister of Finance
- In office 1975–1984
- Premier: John Sharpe; Himself; John Swan

Minister of Health
- In office 1974–1975
- Premier: Edward Richards

Personal details
- Born: 15 June 1927
- Died: 30 March 2014 (aged 86)
- Party: United Bermuda Party
- Relatives: Graham (brother)
- Occupation: Politician, businessman

Sir David Gibbons KBE, JP (15 June 1927 – 30 March 2014) was a Bermudian politician and businessman. He served as Minister of Health from 1974 to 1975, Minister of Finance from 1975 to 1985 and ultimately as Premier between 1977 and 1982 for the United Bermuda Party. Gibbons was also a member of the House of Assembly of Bermuda. During his term as Premier he had to deal with large-scale riots in 1977 and a general strike in 1981. He is recognized as one of the architects of modern Bermuda, laying the foundations for the offshore financial industry and reinsurance sector.

== Early life and career ==
Gibbons was born on 15 June 1927. He had an elder brother, Graham, who also became a politician and businessman, as well as a sister. He attended The Hotchkiss School where he met William Clay Ford Sr., whom he later contacted to become agents for Ford in Bermuda. Gibbons afterwards studied economics at Harvard University.

Both before and after his terms in office Gibbons was a businessman. He ran the family business with his brother Graham, which he inherited from his father Edmund. In 1954 Gibbons became the chief executive officer of Edmund Gibbons Ltd, and as of 2011 still served in that position. He managed to strengthen and expand the business in Bermuda and abroad. Gibbons served as chairman of the Butterfield Bank from 1975 to 1984.

== Political career ==
In 1972 Gibbons was elected to House of Assembly of Bermuda. Two years later, in 1974, he was asked by Premier Edward Richards to serve as Minister of Health, to which he agreed.

Gibbons became Finance Minister in 1975. From 1976 he managed to reach a positive government budget, which he managed to do for eleven years. With this he managed to significantly reduce the debts of Bermuda. In the mid-1970s he helped with insurance law that made the country more attractive to US business. And in 1977 he was one the mayor proponents of the Insurance Act.

Gibbons became Premier on 30 August 1977. He served for the United Bermuda Party. As Premier he dealt with the riots in 1977 after the hanging of two men convicted of the assassination of Governor Richard Sharples. In 1978 he asked American psychologist Kenneth Clark to perform a review of the social situation of Bermuda. The following report and its implementation led to social programmes and institutions, including the Bermuda Housing Corporation and a human rights commission. In April 1981 Gibbons presented the government's largest budget up until that point, at 132 million dollar. As Premier Gibbons also had to deal with a general strike in 1981. In the wake of the strike, in late 1981, he decided to step down as Premier.

Gibbons' term as premier ended on 15 January 1982. He was succeeded by John Swan. His term as Finance Minister ended in 1984. He was credited as one of the designers of Bermuda's offshore financial business, and one the architects of modern Bermuda. Swan stated that under the guidance of Gibbons the legal framework for Bermuda's reinsurance and international business sector was laid. Gibbons was an opponent of Bermudian independence from the United Kingdom, citing the free costs for defence and diplomacy as advantages.

== Post-political life ==
In 1986 Gibbons became chairman of the Colonial Insurance Company. He became director of the Nordic American Tanker Shipping in 1995. In 2011 he called the Labour government under Paula Cox incompetent stating the government racked up large debts.

== Personal life ==
Gibbons had a daughter from his first marriage. He was subsequently married to Lully Gibbons with whom he had three more sons.

He was an avid sportsman, playing tennis in his youth and he dived until his 70s. As a philanthropist Gibbons with his family donated lands to the Bermuda National Trust and Audubon Society and with his company funds to the Bermuda Hospital. He was a justice of the peace.

Gibbons died at King Edward VII Memorial Hospital after a short illness on 30 March 2014, aged 86. His memorial took place at Cathedral of the Most Holy Trinity, Bermuda and was presided over by bishop Nick Dill with a eulogy given by Gibbons's two sons and his successor as Premier and friend, John Swan.
