= 1972 Bermudian general election =

- 7 June 1972
- All 40 seats in the House of Assembly; 21 seats needed for a majority
- Turnout: 76.90%
Party	Leader	Vote %	Seats	+/–
UBP	Edward Richards	61.77	30	0
PLP	Lois Browne-Evans	38.23	10	0
This lists parties that won seats. See the complete results below.
Government Leader before	Government Leader after
Edward Richards; UBP	Edward Richards; UBP

General elections were held in Bermuda on 7 June 1972. The ruling United Bermuda Party remained in power, again winning 30 of the 40 seats in the House of Assembly.

== Electoral system ==
The 40 members of the House of Assembly were elected in 20 two-member constituencies. Voters had two votes, with the two candidates with the highest vote number being elected.

== Results ==
Party	Votes	%	Seats	+/–
United Bermuda Party	21,036	61.77	30	0
Progressive Labour Party	13,018	38.23	10	0
Total	34,054	100.00	40	0
Total votes	17,673	–		
Registered voters/turnout	22,981	76.90		
Source: Parliamentary Registry
