= 1993 Bermudian general election =

- 5 October 1993
- All 40 seats in the House of Assembly; 21 seats needed for a majority
- Turnout: 78.33% (▲4.01pp)
Party	Leader	Vote %	Seats	+/–
UBP	John Swan	50.51	22	−1
PLP	L. Frederick Wade	45.84	18	+3
This lists parties that won seats. See the complete results below.
Premier before	Premier after
John Swan; UBP	John Swan; UBP

General elections were held in Bermuda on 5 October 1993. The result was a victory for the United Bermuda Party, which won 22 of the 40 seats in the House of Assembly.

== Electoral system ==
The 40 members of the House of Assembly were elected in 20 two-member constituencies. Voters had two votes, with the two candidates with the highest vote number being elected.

== Results ==
Party	Votes	%	Seats	+/–
United Bermuda Party	25,527	50.51	22	–1
Progressive Labour Party	23,168	45.84	18	+3
National Liberal Party	1,449	2.87	0	–1
Independents	397	0.79	0	–1
Total	50,541	100.00	40	0
Total votes	26,572	–		
Registered voters/turnout	33,922	78.33		
Source: Parliamentary Registry
