= Colin Hamilton Benbow =

Member of the House of Assembly of Bermuda
- In office 1976–1980
- Preceded by: William Cox
- Succeeded by: William Cox
- Constituency: Devonshire South

Personal details
- Born: 1931
- Died: May 1, 2016
- Party: United Bermuda Party
- Education: University of Oxford
- Occupation: Historian, teacher, politician, author
- Known for: Boer Prisoners of War in Bermuda

Colin Hamilton Benbow (1931 – May 2016) was a history teacher, writer, and member of the House of Assembly of Bermuda for the United Bermuda Party for the constituency of Devonshire South. He was chairman of the Board of Works, Agriculture and Fisheries. While in office he played a part in naming Bermuda's roads. He lost his job on one occasion for his views on the legalization of marijuana.

Benbow is best known for his book Boer Prisoners of War in Bermuda.

== Biography ==
Benbow grew up in England and served in the army before attending Oxford University. His initial 18-month service was extended by two years, during which he volunteered for deployment to Korea.

Benbow arrived in Bermuda in 1955. He pursued a career in teaching before entering politics in 1968, when he ran unsuccessfully as an Independent candidate. In 1976, he was elected to the House of Assembly as a member of the ruling United Bermuda Party, defeating incumbent William Cox. He served until 1980, when Cox regained the seat in a subsequent election.

== Boer Prisoners of War in Bermuda ==
Benbow began writing Boer Prisoners of War in Bermuda in 1959, after entering a historical essay competition marking the 350th anniversary of Bermuda’s founding. Initially intended as a short study, the work expanded as Benbow uncovered largely unrecorded accounts of South African prisoners held on the island during the Boer War.

The first edition was published as a modest essay accompanied by photographs, but subsequent editions incorporated additional letters, documents, and images collected over several decades. The book has since become a key reference on this previously overlooked aspect of Bermuda’s history and continues to attract interest from researchers and descendants of the former prisoners.

The fourth edition of the book was published in 2006 as a tribute to Benbow, who was at the time widely regarded as one of Bermuda’s leading historians.

== Selected publications ==
- A century of progress: A history of the Bermuda Telephone Company Ltd., 1887–1987. 1987.
- Boer Prisoners of War in Bermuda by Colin Benbow. 1994.
- Gladys Morrell And The Women's Suffrage Movement In Bermuda. 1994.
- Hamilton, Bermuda: City and Capital 1897–1997. The Corporation of the City of Hamilton, 1997. (With Marian S. Robb) ISBN 0968240003
- The Teachers Association of Bermuda: (1949–1964): The Short History of a Small Trade Union. 2000.
