= Neletha Butterfield =

Bermudian politician, author, and educator

Dr. the Honorable D. Neletha Butterfield MBE, JP

Member of Parliament of Bermuda
- In office 1998–2012
- Constituency: Pembroke West Central

Senator of Bermuda
- In office 1993–1998

Personal details
- Party: Progressive Labour Party

D. Neletha Butterfield (born October 8) is a Bermudan politician, educator, and author who served as a Member of Parliament of Bermuda from 1998 to 2012. She previously served as a Senator of Bermuda from 1993 to 1998. She founded and directed alternative learning center C.A.R.E beginning in 1983. Since her term in politics, she has written books.

== Biography ==
Butterfield has stated her birthday is October 8. She grew up in Pembroke Parish, in the constituency of Pembroke West Central. From a young age, she was a fast runner, and her parents first thought she would become a professional athlete. She studied business administration and computer science.

She worked as a computer education consultant and as a lecturer at the Bermuda College. She founded her own school, C.A.R.E., and also co-founded Prison Fellowship Bermuda, where she helped prisoners learn how to read and attain diplomas.

In 1993, she first contested the Pembroke West Central constituency, but ultimately lost the election. She was appointed that same year to the Senate of Bermuda, where she was opposition spokesperson for the Ministries of Education, Community and Cultural Affairs, Youth Development, Sports, Parks and Recreation and Women's Issues. She was elected to the House of Assembly of Bermuda in 1998, where she served in various ministerial roles. She cited her favorite as her six-week tenure as Minister of Education. As Minister of the Environment, she faced controversy for her approval of a two-story car park for the First Church of God, Bermuda and her delistings.

In 2008, she was removed from the Cabinet by Premier Ewart Brown, in the wake of speculation her reappointment by Brown in 2006 was to appease supporters of his predecessor Alex Scott. However, by 2010, she rejoined the Cabinet as Minister of Culture and Social Rehabilitation. In this role, she called for more foster parents.

In the 2011 elections, she faced a primary challenge from then-Senator David Burt. In the first round, the two tied 35-35, but after a recount, Butterfield got 35 votes to Burt's 34. Allegations flew, however, that Butterfield's 17-year-old grandson had voted despite a recent rule change limiting voters to those above 18, and a second vote was held. This vote was inconclusive, so a third vote was held. In this vote, she lost to Burt, which she alleged was due to some of her supporters being away. She declined a Senate seat.

After her term in office, she became an author and as of 2024 had published ten books. Her tenth book was dedicated to her son, who died in 2023.

She has emphasized what she calls her four Ps: "Prayer, planning, preparation, and people." She has stated part of her surprise at losing her ministerial role in 2008 was from neglecting preparation. She has also emphasized ensuring female representation in the Cabinet and the Senate. As of 2025, she resides both in Bermuda and in Jamaica.

She was named a Member of the British Empire in 2011. She holds an honorary Doctorate of Education. She is a justice of the peace. She previously served as President of the Bermuda Business and Professional Women's Club.
