= 1983 Bermudian general election =

- 4 February 1983
- 40 seats in the House of Assembly; 21 seats needed for a majority
- Turnout: 80.66% (▲0.82pp)
Party	Leader	Vote %	Seats	+/–
UBP	John Swan	56.60	26	+4
PLP	Lois Browne-Evans	43.40	14	−4
This lists parties that won seats. See the complete results below.
Premier before	Premier after
John Swan; UBP	John Swan; UBP

General elections were held in Bermuda on 4 February 1983. The result was a victory for the United Bermuda Party, which won 26 of the 40 seats.

== Electoral system ==
The 40 members of the House of Assembly were elected in 20 two-member constituencies. Voters had two votes, with the two candidates with the highest vote number being elected.

== Results ==
Of the 29,958 registered voters, 24,163 cast valid votes. In 18 constituencies both elected members were from the same party, whilst two constituencies elected one member of the United Bermuda Party and one from the Progressive Labour Party.

Party	Votes	%	Seats	+/–
United Bermuda Party	27,081	56.60	26	+4
Progressive Labour Party	20,765	43.40	14	–4
Total	47,846	100.00	40	0
Total votes	24,163	–		
Registered voters/turnout	29,958	80.66		
Source: Parliamentary Registry
