= Vincent Bridgewater =

Bermudian politician

Vincent Roland Chesterfield Bridgewater (died February 2015) was a Bermudian dentist and member of the parliament of Bermuda for the United Bermuda Party from the constituency of Paget West.

== Biography ==
Bridgewater grew up in the Parsons Road area of Pembroke and attended the Central School, now known as Victor Scott School. He later studied dentistry in the United States before returning to Bermuda to establish his own practice. From 1980 to 1983, he represented Paget West in the House of Assembly. He served in the Senate of Bermuda for the United Bermuda Party.
