= Attorney General of Bermuda =

Established in 1698, the Attorney-General's Chambers of Bermuda is the main legal advisor to the federal government and makes laws accessible to the public. From 1698-1999, the Attorney-General was also the main prosecutor in all criminal matters that pertained to the Bermuda courts. Attorneys-General are appointed by the Governor per the Constitution. All were public officers until 1999 when Lois Browne-Evans was appointed as the island's first political Attorney-General through election. Due to Bermuda's decision to have a political Attorney-General, the Director of Public Prosecutions now handles all criminal matters. Even though there are now two distinct offices, the Attorney-General is also considered Bermuda's Minister of Legal Affairs.

== List of attorneys general ==
- Samuel Brownlow Gray, CMG (1861–1900)
- Reginald Gray, KC (1900–1919)
- Lt.-Col. Thomas Melville Dill, OBE (1920–1937)
- Joseph Trounsell Gilbert (1938–1952)
- J. B. Pine (1954–1957)
- John C. Summerfield (1962–1971)
- Gerald D.M. Collett (1972–1981)
- Saul Froomkin (1981–1991)
- Walter Maddocks (1991–1995)
- Elliot Deighton Mottley (1995–1998)
- Lois Browne-Evans (1999–2003) [1st female]
- Larry Mussenden (2004–2006)
- Philip Perinchief (2006–2007)
- Kim Wilson (2007–2010)
- Michael Scott (2010–2011)
- Kim Wilson (2011–2012)
- Mark Pettingill (2012–2014)
- Trevor Moniz (2014–2017)
- Kathy Lynn Simmons (2017–present)

== See also ==
- Justice ministry
- Politics of Bermuda
