= Trevor Moniz =

Portuguese-Bermudian politician

Trevor Gerard Moniz
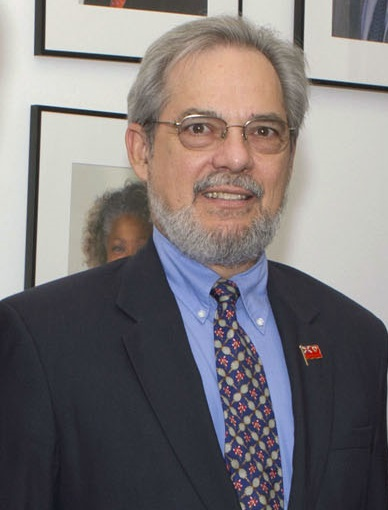
- Moniz in 2011

Member of the House of Assembly for Smith's West
- In office 5 October 1993 - 3 August 2020

Personal details
- Party: One Bermuda Alliance
- Education: King's College London

Trevor Gerard Moniz is a Portuguese-Bermudian politician who served as Attorney General and Minister of Legal Affairs in the Government of Bermuda from 2014 to 2017.

He attended Saltus Grammar School and studied law at King's College London on a Bermuda Government scholarship, graduating with an LLB in 1975. He was called to the Bar in England and Wales in 1976, and to the Bermuda Bar in 1977. He also attended the University of Toronto (Diploma in Business Administration). He was elected to the House of Assembly of Bermuda in 1993 and retired in August 2020.

Throughout his career, Moniz sponsored or supported several private members’ bills, including the John Stubbs Criminal Code Amendment Act 1994, which decriminalised sodomy, the Prohibited Restaurants Act 1997, which banned fast-food franchises in Bermuda, and the Charities Amendment Act 1998, which opened the financial accounts of registered charities to public inspection. He was also among a group of Members of Parliament in the UBP who opposed then-premier Sir John Swan’s proposed 1995 referendum on independence and later resisted the introduction of McDonald’s restaurants on the island.

In 2022, Moniz became the first Bermudian of Portuguese descent to be inducted into the Azorean Order of Merit, awarded by the Legislative Assembly of the Azores for his public service, professional achievements, and promotion of Bermuda’s Portuguese heritage. His nomination was based on his years of dedication to the legal profession, his advocacy for migrant workers and immigration reform, and his service to the National Museum of Bermuda and the Portuguese Cultural Association of Bermuda.

== Personal life ==
Moniz has been married to Yolanda since 1993, they have one son and three daughters.
