= Graham Gibbons =

Bermudian businessman and politician (1920–2016)

Mayor of Hamilton, Bermuda
- In office 1972–1988
- Preceded by: Gilbert Cooper

Personal details
- Born: Edmund Graham Gibbons II; 10 March 1920 Bermuda
- Died: 18 June 2016 (aged 96) Bermuda
- Spouse: Ida Gibbons (m. 1949; died 1988)
- Children: Tracy Gibbons; Grant Gibbons
- Profession: Businessman, politician

Edmund Graham Gibbons II CBE (10 March 1920 – 18 June 2016) was a Bermudian businessman and politician who served as the mayor of Hamilton from 1972 to 1988. Gibbons was the brother of the late Sir David Gibbons, the former Premier of Bermuda from 1977 until 1982. Together, the Gibbons brothers owned and operated the Edmund Gibbons Ltd., a holding company, and its affiliated companies, for more than forty years.

== Biography ==
=== Early life ===
Gibbons was born on 10 March 1920, in Bermuda. His father, businessman Edmund Gibbons, had co-founded the family business, which he and his brother would later inherit.

Gibbons served in the cipher office of the Royal Navy during World War II. Gibbons, who was stationed for almost a year at Admiralty House in Bermuda, worked on breaking German codes during the war. He was also deployed to cipher offices in Jamaica and British Ceylon.

Gibbons married his wife, the former Ida Gibson, a painter and watercolorist, in 1949. They had two children: a daughter, Tracy Gibbons, and a son, Grant Gibbons, a politician and government minister. Graham and Ida Gibbons remained married until her death from cancer in 1988.

=== Business and political career ===
Gibbons returned to Bermuda following the war. In 1946, Gibbons joined his family's company, which had been co-founded by his father. Graham Gibbons oversaw the retail divisions of Edmund Gibbons Ltd., while his brother, David Gibbons, oversaw the company's other holdings, including Bermuda Motors and Colonial Insurance. He served as the President of Edmund Gibbons Ltd. until his retirement during the 1980s. Additionally, Gibbons headed the Bermuda Chamber of Commerce from 1950 to 1951.

Gibbons served as the mayor of Hamilton, Bermuda's capital city, from 1972 to 1988, an unusually long tenure for the mayor's office. He was awarded Commander of the Order of the British Empire (CBE) in 1985 during his time as mayor.

Gibbons directed much of his family's philanthropic efforts to the Bermuda National Trust, which preserves the island's heritage. She had originally inherited 19 acres of the family's sprawling property, known as Locust Hall and located in Devonshire Parish, while his sister, Patsy Phillips, who worked for the Bermuda National Trust, inherited six acres of Locust Hall. In a surprise charitable gift, Graham Gibbons donated the family's entire Locust Hall property to the Bermuda National Trust, with the stipulation that it remain intact as farmland and woodlands.

Gibbons died on 18 June 2016, aged 96, in Bermuda. He was survived by his two children: Tracy and Grant Gibbons, the current Minister of Economic Development of Bermuda. Gibbon's funeral was held at the Cathedral of the Most Holy Trinity in Hamilton. His wife, painter Ida Gibbons, died from cancer in 1988. His brother, former Premier David Gibbons, died in 2014.
