= 1968 Bermudian general election =

- 22 May 1968
- 40 seats in the House of Assembly; 21 seats needed for a majority
Party	Leader	Seats	+/–
UBP	Henry Tucker	30	New
PLP	Walter Robinson	10	+4
This lists parties that won seats. See the complete results below.
Government Leader after
Henry Tucker; UBP

General elections were held in Bermuda on 22 May 1968. The result was a victory for the United Bermuda Party, which won 30 of the 40 seats in the House of Assembly. The Progressive Labour Party increased its representation by four to ten.

On 10 June 1968, Henry Tucker became the territory's first Premier.

== Electoral system ==
Four additional constituencies were created since the 1963 election. The election was the first held under equal universal suffrage, as the additional vote for property owners used in the 1963 election was scrapped, and the voting age lowered from 25 to 21.

== Results ==
Party	Seats	+/–
United Bermuda Party	30	New
Progressive Labour Party	10	+4
Bermuda Democratic Party	0	New
Independents	0	–30
Total	40	+4
Source: Caribbean Elections
