= 1998 Bermudian general election =

- 9 November 1998
- 40 seats in the House of Assembly; 21 seats needed for a majority
- Turnout: 82.76% (▲4.43pp)
Party	Leader	Vote %	Seats	+/–
PLP	Jennifer Smith	54.57	26	+8
UBP	Pamela Gordon	44.32	14	−8
This lists parties that won seats. See the complete results below.
Premier before	Premier after
Pamela Gordon; UBP	Jennifer Smith; PLP

General elections were held in Bermuda on 9 November 1998. The result was a victory for the Progressive Labour Party, which won 26 of the 40 seats in the House of Assembly.

== Electoral system ==
The 40 members of the House of Assembly were elected in 20 two-member constituencies. Voters had two votes, with the two candidates with the highest vote number being elected.

== Results ==
Party	Votes	%	Seats	+/–
Progressive Labour Party	30,422	54.57	26	+8
United Bermuda Party	24,706	44.32	14	–8
National Liberal Party	471	0.84	0	0
Independents	147	0.26	0	0
Total	55,746	100.00	40	0
Total votes	29,378	–		
Registered voters/turnout	35,499	82.76		
Source: Parliamentary Registry
