= Kim Wilson (politician) =

Bermudian politician

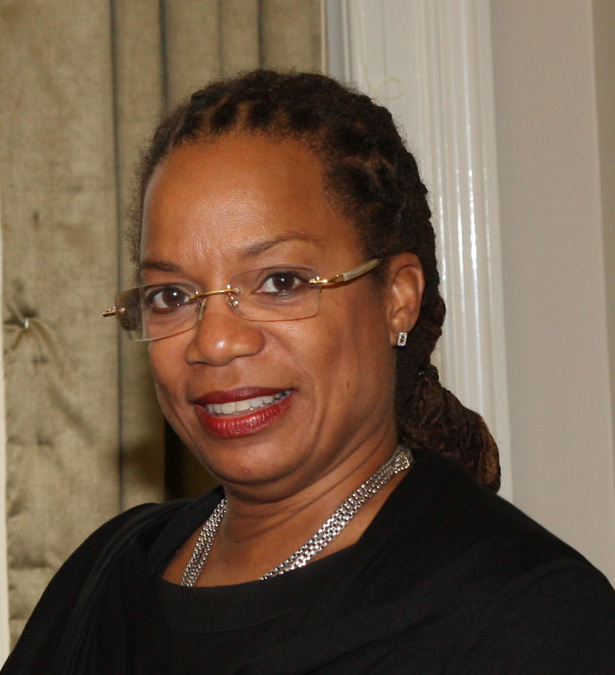

Minister for Health
- Incumbent
- Assumed office 2017
- Monarch: Queen Elizabeth II
- Parliamentary group: Progressive Labour Party
- Constituency: Sandys South Central

Minister for Justice
- In office 2011–2012

Personal details
- Education: University of Illinois Urbana-Champaign; Indiana University Bloomington; School of Oriental and African Studies

Kim Wilson is a Bermudian politician and lawyer, who is Minister of Health for the Government of Bermuda. Elected to parliament in 2012, Wilson has held several ministries, as a member of the Progressive Labour Party.

== Career ==
Wilson studied for a BSc in Psychology at the University of Illinois Urbana-Champaign. She then moved to further study, first at Indiana University Bloomington for a M.Ed in Counselling, followed by an LLB (Hons) from the School of Oriental and African Studies. She was called to the Bermuda Bar in 1995. Her political career began in October 2006 when she was appointed as a Government Senator in the Upper House and as Junior Minister of Finance and Education. She was subsequently appointed Attorney-General and Minister of Justice in December 2007.

In 2010 she was the first person to be appointed Ministry of Economy, Trade and Industry. In 2011 she returned to the roles of Attorney-General and Minister of Justice, and also became Senate Leader. She was elected to parliament in December 2012, representing the Progressive Labour Party in the constituency of Sandys South Central. During time as Minister for Health, Wilson was responsible for the territory's response to the COVID-19 pandemic, acting with "an abundance of caution".

She was reappointed Minister of Health following the 2025 Bermudian general election.
