= 2003 Bermudian general election =

- 24 July 2003
- 36 seats in the House of Assembly; 19 seats needed for a majority
- Turnout: 74.87% (▼7.89pp)
Party	Leader	Vote %	Seats	+/–
PLP	Jennifer Smith	50.50	22	−4
UBP	Grant Gibbons	49.13	14	0
This lists parties that won seats. See the complete results below.
Premier before	Premier after
Jennifer Smith; PLP	Jennifer Smith; PLP

General elections were held in Bermuda on 24 July 2003. The result was a victory for the Progressive Labour Party, which won 22 of the 36 seats in the House of Assembly.

== Electoral system ==
The 36 members of the House of Assembly were elected from single-member constituencies by first-past-the-post voting.

== Results ==
Party	Votes	%	Seats	+/–
Progressive Labour Party	14,868	50.50	22	–4
United Bermuda Party	14,466	49.13	14	0
National Liberal Party	41	0.14	0	0
Gombey Liberation Party	16	0.05	0	New
Independents	51	0.17	0	0
Total	29,442	100.00	36	–4
Valid votes	29,442	99.83		
Invalid/blank votes	51	0.17		
Total votes	29,493	100.00		
Registered voters/turnout	39,394	74.87		
Source: Parliamentary Registry
