= John Henry Sharpe =

Bermudian politician (1921–1999)

The Honourable Sir John Henry Sharpe CBE, JP

2nd Premier of Bermuda
- Monarch: Elizabeth II
- Preceded by: Edward Richards
- Succeeded by: Sir David Gibbons

Personal details
- Born: 8 November 1921 Bermuda
- Died: 11 July 1999 (aged 77)
- Party: United Bermuda Party

Sir John Henry Sharpe (8 November 1921 – 11 July 1999) was a Bermudian politician. He served as Premier of Bermuda from 29 December 1975 to 30 August 1977. Prior to becoming Premier, succeeding Edward Richards, Sharpe served as Minister for Finance.

In 1977, his government presented a discussion paper on independence for Bermuda.

He later served as Minister of Labour and Home Affairs in the government of John Swan. First elected as MP for Warwick West in the House of Assembly in 1963, he retained the seat until he was defeated in the 1993 general election by Ewart Brown of the Progressive Labour Party. Following his death in 1999, a joint sitting of Parliament was held to pay respects to him.
