= David Saul =

Bermudian politician (1939–2017)

5th Premier of Bermuda
- In office 25 August 1995 – 27 March 1997
- Preceded by: John Swan
- Succeeded by: Pamela Gordon

Personal details
- Born: David John Saul; November 27, 1939 Warwick, Bermuda
- Died: May 15, 2017 (aged 77) Devonshire, Bermuda
- Party: United Bermuda Party
- Occupation: Politician, businessman
- Known for: Premier of Bermuda (1995–1997)

David John Saul (Warwick, 27 November 1939 – Devonshire, 15 May 2017) was a Bermudian politician who was the Premier of Bermuda from 1995 to 1997.

== Political career ==
Having finished his career in business David Saul was elected in 1989 from the United Bermuda Party (UBP) and soon after became a Minister of Finance at the government of John Swan. In 1995 the latter appointed him as his successor at the head of United Bermuda Party and government.

Saul was the fifth premier of Bermuda from 25 August 1995 to 27 March 1997, and his main task was negotiations with the British government of John Major about receiving British citizenship for the inhabitants of Bermuda. However, during Saul's tenure, UBP divided in two parts. One part supported the former Premier John Swan, who wanted to bring the franchise of McDonald's restaurants he owned to Bermuda. Unable to bring back party unity, Saul had to resign in 1997 and returned to running his businesses.

== Business career after resignation ==
Saul held two senior posts with Fidelity Investments, from 1984 through to 1995, as the President of Fidelity Bermuda and Executive Vice President of Fidelity International. He retired from the firm in 1999 but remained a Director of Fidelity's main international Board of Dr. Solomon's Group PLC. He was a founding Trustee of the Bermuda Underwater Exploration Institute and a founding Director of the Professional Shipwreck Explorers Association. Saul served as an Operational Controller of Canetic Resources Trust.

== Personal life ==
Saul was married to his wife, Christine, and had two children, Jonathan and Robin. Saul suffered a stroke in March 2017 and then a second stroke soon after, which severely worsened his condition. Soon after, on 15 May 2017, he died at his home due to his condition. A memorial service was held at the Cathedral of the Most Holy Trinity in Hamilton, Bermuda. The service was attended by multiple former Premiers and cabinet ministers. He was buried at sea soon after.
