= 1995 Bermudian independence referendum =

- 16 August 1995
- Are you in favour of independence for Bermuda?

Results
Choice	Votes	%
Yes	5,714	25.88%
No	16,369	74.12%
Valid votes	22,083	99.31%
Invalid or blank votes	153	0.69%
Total votes	22,236	100.00%
Registered voters/turnout	37,841	58.76%

An independence referendum was held in Bermuda on 16 August 1995 for voters to decide whether Bermuda should become an independent sovereign state or remain a British Dependent Territory. On a voter turnout of 59%, 74% voted against independence. Following the decisive result, Premier John Swan, who had been in favour of independence, resigned.

== Background ==
After being an extension of the Virginia colony, Bermuda was made a crown colony of its own rights in 1609 and became a self-governing colony in 1620, with the founding of the Parliament of Bermuda. Following World War II, much of the British Empire was granted independence. In 1968 Bermuda gained a constitution, but the British Government determined that Bermuda was not ready for independence, and so Bermuda was included on the United Nations list of non-self-governing territories. In 1981 Bermuda became a British Dependent Territory as a result of the British Nationality Act 1981.

On 25 March 1995 the House of Assembly of Bermuda narrowly passed the Independence Referendum Bill 20–18, the Senate passed the Bill unopposed two weeks later. For independence to be approved, the yes vote had to be supported by at least 40% of those eligible to vote and over 50% of those who voted.

The referendum question (as set out by the Independence Referendum Act 1995) was:

Are you in favour of independence for Bermuda?

The vote was originally scheduled for 15 August 1995 but was delayed to the next day by Hurricane Felix passing over the islands. Polls were open from 10:00 to 21:00. The decision to delay the referendum was the subject of a public inquiry, which found the Government had acted in accordance with the law.

== Campaign ==
Although in favour of independence, the opposition Progressive Labour Party, led by Frederick Wade, voted against the Referendum Bill, called for a boycott of the referendum itself and stated that independence should be determined in a general election. The governing United Bermuda Party was split on the issue, with Premier John Swan supporting independence while many of his backbenchers were opposed.

During the campaign, the Committee for the Independence of Bermuda stated that if there was a 'yes' vote, independence would not come immediately. Instead, there would be a constitutional conference in London, which would lead to Bermuda becoming an independent Commonwealth realm, with Queen Elizabeth II as Head of State and the Privy Council remaining the supreme court.

== Result ==
Choice	Votes	%
For	5,714	25.88
Against	16,369	74.12
Invalid/blank votes	153	–
Total	22,236	100
Registered voters/turnout	37,841	58.76
Source: Direct Democracy
