= Russell Dismont =

Russell Dismont (27 June 1913 – 7 October 2005) was from a respected black Bermudian family of the time. Despite racial discrimination typical of that period, his father Albert Hilgrove Dismont had become a successful businessman and was the first black man to own a property and business in the totally white-owned city of Hamilton, Bermuda's capital. In 1988, his other son Cecil became the first black Mayor of the city. In 2003, the road 'Dismont Drive' was named in his honour, in recognition of his service and the family's contribution to Bermuda.

Russell began his education at the Berkeley Preparatory School and the Excelsior Secondary School in his native Bermuda. He developed an early interest in literature, music, and art which he later pursued in the United States at the New York School of Art. A keen sportsman, he was a well-known tennis player and cricketer for St Georges Cricket Club (Bermuda), which he helped form. While studying law at the London School of Economics in England, he played for the University of London and once with Sir Garfield Sobers. During this period, he often socialised and talked politics with actors Earl Cameron and Sidney Poitier and the founding father of the Kenyan nation, Jomo Kenyatta.

Upon his return to Bermuda, he won many local tennis championships. Despite this, because of being "coloured", he was permitted to play at the island's tennis clubs only twice a year. Ignoring this rule, on one occasion, he and African-American tennis legend Althea Gibson were ordered off the court. They both faked deafness and continued their game. As a consequence, Mr Dismont was later refused access to the premises completely. In the 1950s, he, William E. R. Joell and others founded the All Bermuda Tennis Club for all people, irrelevant of their skin colour. To continue the interests of the black tennis players, the Somers Isle Lawn Tennis Association was created, of which Mr Dismont was a member.

He began his professional career as an educator and taught at the elementary level at the Central School and later Harrington Sound School. He subsequently became a businessman and operated a shop located in his father's A.H. Dismont Building.

He was becoming increasingly affected and concerned with the racial inequality on the island and was involved in a number of personal and group protests against the social injustices. In 1963, he was elected as one of the first six Members of Colonial Parliament for the newly created Bermudian Progressive Labour Party (PLP). The party was primarily concerned with those issues that affected the "coloured" population and the poor. It called for equitable taxation, the removal of racial discrimination, greater economic parity, the implementation of programmes for healthcare, insurance and pensions. In addition, it called for better housing, improved educational opportunities and electoral reform. During a temporary disenchantment with the Party, he started another – the Bermuda Democratic Party – but later returned and remained a staunch, lifelong supporter of the PLP. On 9 November 1998, the party achieved its ultimate goal and won its first General Election.

His interest in celebrating and preserving the island's culture led him to acquire the magazine Fame (Bermuda). It catered largely to the black community, who had been mostly ignored by other local publications. He remained the publisher and editor for many years.

He has two sons from two of his four marriages: Derek Dismont and Saul Dismont. While at university in Florida, United States, Derek was involved with the Black Panthers. Saul is the nephew of actor Leigh Lawson and Twiggy, and cousin of Crispian Mills, the singer of English rock group Kula Shaker. For a period, Saul was lead singer of the band under its previous name, The Kays. He was a successful club DJ in England (a.k.a. DJ Kemosabe) and is now a barrister in Bermuda.

== Bibliography ==
- Royal Gazette newspaper article
- Bermuda Sun article
- Royal Gazette newspaper article
- Anabolic Info article
- Meredith Ebbin, "PLP pioneer, dead at 92, helped usher in modern politics", Bermuda Sun newspaper article (News from 2005-10-12 Edition).
- PLP website, history of the party
- Twiggy Lawson, Twiggy in Black and White: An Autobiography, 1998
- Boy George column
- http://www.house-music-inyourface.co.uk/neigh006.htm
