= 1963 Bermudian general election =

- 16 May 1963
- All 36 seats in the House of Assembly; 19 seats needed for a majority
Party	Leader	Vote %	Seats
PLP	Arnold Francis	18.62	6
Independents	–	81.38	30
This lists parties that won seats. See the complete results below.

General elections were held in Bermuda on 16 May 1963. They were the first elections to be held under the new Parliamentary Election Act and included political parties. Independents won 30 of the 36 seats in the House of Assembly, with the Progressive Labour Party, which had been established three months before the elections, winning six of the nine seats it contested.

== Electoral system ==
Before the passing of the Parliamentary Election Act the franchise was restricted to property owners. The Act introduced universal suffrage, but increasing the voting age from 21 to 25.

However, powerful white businessmen, who were the dominant force in Parliament at the time, also passed the Watlington Amendment, which gave landowners with rateable property in the territory a second vote in their home constituency. Of the 14,896 registered voters, 8,207 could cast only a single vote and 6,689 were eligible to cast a second vote. Each of the nine parish was divided into two constituencies, each of which returned two members to the House of Assembly, making a total of 36 seats.

== Results ==
Party	Votes	%	Seats
Progressive Labour Party	5,827	18.62	6
Independents	25,471	81.38	30
Total	31,298	100.00	36
Registered voters/turnout	14,896	–	
Source: Parliamentary Registry
