= Jennifer M. Smith =

Bermuda Prime Minister and Cabinet member

The Honourable Dame Jennifer M. Smith DBE, JP, DHumL, MP

7th Premier of Bermuda
- In office 9 December 1998 – 24 July 2003
- Monarch: Elizabeth II
- Governor: Thorold Masefield; Tim Gurney (acting); John Vereker
- Preceded by: Pamela Gordon
- Succeeded by: Alex Scott

Leader of the Opposition
- In office 20 August 1996 – 9 December 1998

Personal details
- Born: 1 January 1947 (age 79)
- Party: Progressive Labour Party

Dame Jennifer Meredith Smith, DBE, JP, DHumL, MP (born 1947) is a Bermudian politician who was the Premier of Bermuda from 1998 until 2003, the first premier who was not a member of the United Bermuda Party.

Affectionately referred to as "Dame Jennifer", she has marked her place in Bermuda's history as the first woman to lead a political party to an election victory, the first Progressive Labour Party Shadow Minister of Education, the first and so far only leader of the PLP to lead the party to win two consecutive general elections, the first female Speaker of the House of Assembly and the second woman to serve as Premier.

Smith is a member of the Council of Women World Leaders, an international network of current and former women presidents and prime ministers whose mission is to mobilize the highest-level women leaders globally for collective action on issues of critical importance to women and equitable development.

== Early life ==
Smith was born in 1947 in Bermuda, the daughter of a bartender. She was raised as a member of the African Methodist Episcopal church. She exhibited an interest in art from an early age, and later enrolled at the Art Institute of Pittsburgh, from which she earned an associate degree in 1970. Upon returning to Bermuda, she began work as a political reporter and editor for the Bermuda Recorder newspaper.

== Political career ==
Dame Jennifer Smith first got involved in frontline politics in 1972, running as a Progressive Labour Party candidate, the youngest person to run for elected office in Bermuda's history.

=== Senate ===
Smith was appointed to the Senate of Bermuda in 1980, becoming Bermuda's youngest Senator and serving in that capacity until 1989.

=== Member of Parliament and deputy party leadership ===
Dame Jennifer was elected to the House of Assembly of Bermuda in 1989 as a member of the Progressive Labour Party. She was elected deputy party leader in 1994, and succeeded to the leadership two years later upon the death of L. Frederick Wade.

=== Leader of the Opposition ===
From 1996 until 1998, Dame Jennifer served as the Leader of the Progressive Labour Party and as Bermuda's Opposition Leader.

=== Premier of Bermuda ===
After two years as Opposition Leader, Smith led her party to victory in parliamentary elections in November 1998, in which the United Bermuda Party, which had dominated elections since autonomy was gained in 1968, suffered an unprecedented defeat.

The Progressive Labour Party again won parliamentary elections in July 2003, but less than a week later, Smith was forced to resign as premier following a coup within her own party. She was replaced by W. Alex Scott, but then was elected as Deputy Speaker of the House of Assembly.

== Damehood ==
Smith was made a Dame Commander of the Order of the British Empire in 2005.
