= National Liberal Party (Bermuda) =

- Founder: Gilbert Darrell; Austin Thomas; Walter Brangman
- Founded: 1985
- Dissolved: 2003
- Split from: PLP

The National Liberal Party was a political party in Bermuda. It was established in 1985 as a breakaway from the Progressive Labour Party by a group of members opposed to the leadership of Lois Browne-Evans. Four sitting MPs left to join the party: Gilbert Darrell, Austin Thomas, Lionel Simmons and Walter Brangman, although Simmons later returned to the PLP.

The new party won two seats in the 1985 general elections with Thomas and leader Darrell retaining their seats. However, the party struggled thereafter, and failed to win seats in the elections in 1993, 1998 and 2003.
