= Edward Richards =

Bermudian politician (1908–1991)

1st Premier of Bermuda
- In office 18 April 1973 – 2 December 1975
- Monarch: Elizabeth II
- Governor: Sir Edwin Leather
- Preceded by: New office
- Succeeded by: John Sharpe

2nd Government Leader of Bermuda
- In office 29 December 1971 – 18 April 1973
- Monarch: Elizabeth II
- Governor: Roland Robinson; Sir Richard Sharples (assassinated); Sir Edwin Leather
- Preceded by: Henry Tucker
- Succeeded by: Office renamed Premier

Personal details
- Born: 4 October 1908 British Guiana (now Guyana)
- Died: May 1991 (aged 83) Bermuda
- Party: United Bermuda Party

Sir Edward Trenton "ET" Richards (4 October 1908 – May 1991) was the first Black Bermudian to head the government of Bermuda and the first Premier of Bermuda. He was the leader of the United Bermuda Party (UBP) between 1971 and 1973. He was a vocal critic of segregation.

== Biography ==
Richards was born in Berbice, British Guiana, British Guiana (now Guyana), the youngest of three siblings. After his mother died while he was an infant, he was raised by his father and grandmother. He trained as a teacher in Georgetown, and in 1930, at the age of 21, he joined his sister Pearl in Bermuda, where he taught mathematics, Latin and games at the Berkeley Institute. He also worked as associate editor of the Bermuda Recorder, and on its pages made known his opposition to segregation. He became a Bermudian citizen seven years after his arrival.

In 1943, he went to Britain to study law at Middle Temple. While studying in London, he assisted Dr. E. F. Gordon to present a celebrated petition from the Bermuda Workers' Association to the British Colonial Secretary in 1946. Richards was called to the UK bar in 1946 and to the Bermuda Bar on 31 January 1947, becoming the fourth black lawyer to practice in Bermuda.

In 1948, he was elected to Parliament representing Warwick Parish, serving in this position for the following two decades.

In 1963, Richards welcomed Emperor Haile Selassie of Ethiopia when Selassie visited Bermuda with his granddaughter Princess Hirut Desta.

== Political life ==
In 1968, he was appointed Deputy Government Leader and Deputy Leader of the UBP. In December 1971, he became Bermuda's first black Government Leader. In 1973, The Constitution Amendment (Consequential Amendments) Act 1973 changed the Government Leader's title to Premier. Richards held the position of Premier until December 1975.

Sir Edward Richards retired from politics on 29 December 1975, and from law practice in 1986, at the age of 78. He died in May 1991 at the age of 83.

== Honours and recognition ==
Richards was knighted by Queen Elizabeth II in 1970.

Richards was a member of Alpha Phi Alpha fraternity.

A portrait of Richards is one of 80 painted by Esther Dai for display at the Historic Museum in Bermuda.

In June 2015, Richards and Gladys Morrell were named National Heroes of Bermuda.

== Family ==
In 1940, Richards married Madree Williams, with whom he had three children. His son, E. T. "Bob" Richards, is a politician and member of the House of Assembly of Bermuda for the United Bermuda Party. His elder daughter is circuit judge Patricia Dangor, who now lives in London, England, with her children and grandchildren. His younger daughter is the writer Angela Barry, who remains in Bermuda with her children and grandchildren.
