= L. Frederick Wade =

Bermudian politician

Leader of the Opposition of Bermuda
- In office 1976–1987
- Preceded by: Lois Browne-Evans
- Succeeded by: Lois Browne-Evans

Personal details
- Born: Leonard Frederick Wade; June 28, 1939 Pembroke Parish, Bermuda
- Died: August 13, 1996 (aged 57)
- Resting place: St. John's Church, Pembroke Parish, Bermuda
- Party: Progressive Labour Party
- Spouses: Marilyn Edwards (divorced); Norma Wilson Morant (divorced); Ianthia Simmons
- Children: Gregory, Michelle, Yusef Wade-Miller, Ceola, Kamela, Frederick
- Education: Queen's University at Kingston; Middle Temple
- Occupation: Politician, lawyer, teacher
- Known for: Leader of the Progressive Labour Party; namesake of L.F. Wade International Airport

Leonard Frederick Wade (28 June 1939 – 13 August 1996) was a prominent Bermudian politician. He served as leader of the opposition Progressive Labour Party (PLP) for 11 years, from 1976 to 1987.

== Early life ==
"Freddie" Wade was the second son of Sgt. Major James Eugene and Helen (née Yorke) Wade. The family was based in Pembroke Parish, but later moved to Warwick Parish. Wade attended Central School (now Victor Scott School) before entering Canada's Ottawa Teachers' College in 1959. Wade completed his studies in June 1960, and joined the teaching staff at Central School, where he taught until 1963. From 1960 to 1963, Wade attended Queen's University in Ontario, receiving a B.A. in economics. He returned to Bermuda, teaching at Prospect Primary School and Sandys Secondary School.

== Political career ==
Despite having grown up in Bermuda, it was only after returning from his time in Canada that he realised how poor conditions were in Bermudian education, especially in regards to the segregation still in force. He joined the Bermuda Union Of Teachers but quickly realised that he was more likely to effect change through wider island politics.

The formation of the PLP in 1962, with its call for major reforms, inspired Wade to join the party, where he became secretary of the party's Devonshire Parish branch.

The 1968 Bermudian general election, though disappointing for the PLP, saw Wade's election as one of two members for Devonshire North. His election led to Wade losing his job, as at the time it was not permitted for a Bermudian to be both an MP and a teacher. He took a series of part-time jobs to pay his way, but his membership of what was seen as a radical political party did him no favours. He was elected party chairman in 1970.

After re-election in 1972, Wade applied for law school and was admitted to London's Middle Temple. He passed his finals in 1976, and during the same year became Deputy Leader of the PLP.

During his time in parliament, Wade held many shadow ministries, including finance, education, and home affairs.

In November 1985, long-time Opposition Leader and colleague of Wade Lois Browne-Evans resigned as PLP leader. Wade was elected as her replacement. He began increasing the appeal of the party by reducing the more radical elements of the party's policy and reaching out to business leaders especially those in international business, who were traditionally supporters of the PLP's opponents, the United Bermuda Party (UBP).

== Personal life ==
In December 1959, Wade married Marilyn Edwards. Their son Gregory was born in 1960, followed by daughter Michelle in 1965.

The couple divorced during the 1970s, and Wade married for a second time, to Jamaican lawyer Norma Wilson Morant. In 1977 the Wades made history as the first married couple in Bermuda to both serve as lawyers. Yusef, Wade-Miller's son from a previous marriage, was adopted by Wade. Again, the marriage did not last.

Wade was married for a third time in 1989, to Ianthia Simmons. In 1991 they became parents of triplets: Ceola, Kamela, and Frederick.

== Health concerns ==
The strenuous schedule of trying to run a law practice while serving as a leading politician took their toll on Wade's health. In 1996, he required treatment at Johns Hopkins Hospital in Baltimore, Maryland, for a heart scare. However, his hereditary condition of polycystic kidney disease, which killed his mother at a young age, became his more serious issue health issue. Wade's health declined during the proceeding decade, but he kept up his tiring work schedule.

== Death ==
In 1996, he collapsed while on his way to attend the 42nd Commonwealth Parliamentary Association Conference in Malaysia, and did not recover. Wade is buried at St. John's Church in Pembroke Parish, Bermuda.

== Legacy ==
In April 2007, the PLP Government renamed Bermuda's sole airport L.F. Wade International Airport in his honour.
