= List of premiers of Bermuda =

Premier of Bermuda
- Coat of arms of Bermuda

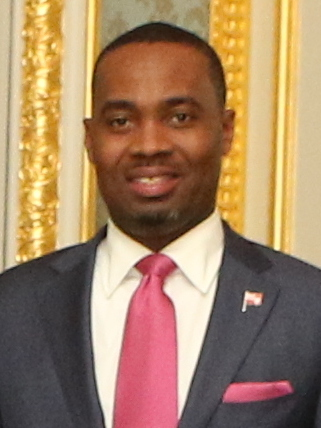
- Incumbent; Edward David Burt; JP, MP since 19 July 2017
- Style: The Honourable
- Appointer: Governor of Bermuda
- Term length: At the governor's pleasure
- Formation: 19 June 1968
- First holder: Sir Henry Tucker as Government Leader
- Website: Office of the Premier

The premier of Bermuda serves as head of government of Bermuda, under appointment by the governor of Bermuda, in the governor's capacity as representative in Bermuda of the British monarch, currently King Charles III. The position was created by Bermuda's 1968 Constitution.

Since 19 July 2017, the premier has been Edward David Burt, the leader of the Progressive Labour Party.

== List ==
(Dates in italics indicate de facto continuation of office)

UBP PLP OBA
No.	Portrait	Name (Birth–Death)	Term of office			Political party	Elected	Notes
No.	Portrait	Name (Birth–Death)	Took office	Left office	Time in office	Political party	Elected	Notes
Government Leaders (1968–1973)
1		Sir Henry Tucker (1903–1986)	10 June 1968	29 December 1971	3 years, 202 days	United Bermuda Party	1968	
2		Sir Edward Richards (1908–1991)	29 December 1971	18 April 1973	1 year, 110 days	United Bermuda Party	1972	First Black Bermudian Premier
Premiers (1973–present)
1		Sir Edward Richards (1908–1991)	18 April 1973	29 December 1975	2 years, 255 days	United Bermuda Party	—	
2		John Sharpe (1921–1999)	29 December 1975	30 August 1977	1 year, 244 days	United Bermuda Party	1976	
3		David Gibbons (1926–2014)	30 August 1977	15 January 1982	4 years, 138 days	United Bermuda Party	1980	From 1983, Sir David Gibbons
4		John Swan (1935–2026)	15 January 1982	25 August 1995	13 years, 222 days	United Bermuda Party	1983; 1985; 1989; 1993	From 1990, Sir John Swan. Resigned following the 1995 independence referendum
5		David Saul (1939–2017)	25 August 1995	27 March 1997	1 year, 214 days	United Bermuda Party	—	
6		Pamela Gordon (born 1955)	27 March 1997	10 November 1998	1 year, 228 days	United Bermuda Party	—	First female Premier
7		Jennifer Smith (born 1947)	10 November 1998	29 July 2003	4 years, 261 days	Progressive Labour Party	1998	
8		Alex Scott (born 1940)	29 July 2003	30 October 2006	3 years, 93 days	Progressive Labour Party	2003	
9		Ewart Brown (born 1946)	30 October 2006	29 October 2010	3 years, 364 days	Progressive Labour Party	2007	
10		Paula Cox (born 1964?)	29 October 2010	18 December 2012	2 years, 50 days	Progressive Labour Party	—	
11		Craig Cannonier (born 1962)	18 December 2012	19 May 2014	1 year, 152 days	One Bermuda Alliance	2012	Resigned
12		Michael Dunkley (born 1957)	19 May 2014	19 July 2017	3 years, 61 days	One Bermuda Alliance	—	
13		Edward David Burt (born 1979)	19 July 2017	Incumbent	9 years, 89 days	Progressive Labour Party	2017; 2020; 2025	

== See also ==
- List of current heads of government in the United Kingdom and dependencies
- Governor of Bermuda
- Lists of office-holders
