= Henry Tucker (Bermudian politician, born 1903) =

First premier of Bermuda (1903–1986)

Sir Henry Tucker MP

1st Government Leader of Bermuda
- In office 10 June 1968 – 29 December 1971
- Monarch: Elizabeth II
- Governor: Roland Robinson
- Preceded by: New office
- Succeeded by: Edward Richards

Personal details
- Born: 14 March 1903 Bermuda
- Died: 9 January 1986 (aged 82) Bermuda
- Party: United Bermuda Party
- Spouse: Catherine Tucker
- Relatives: Joanne Tucker (granddaughter); Adam Driver (grandson-in-law)

Sir Henry James Tucker (14 March 1903 – 9 January 1986) was a Bermudian politician who was the first Government Leader of Bermuda. He is considered—together with Dr. E. F. Gordon (1895–1955)—one of the island's two most important leaders of the 20th century. Tucker first took office on 10 June 1968 and served until 29 December 1971 as a member of the United Bermuda Party (UBP), the political party that he helped found in 1964.

== Life and career ==
Henry Tucker was born in Bermuda on 14 March 1903, the son of merchant Henry James and Nella Louise (born Trott). He was a direct descendant of the first British settlers in Bermuda, who included Daniel Tucker, an early Bermudian colonial governor in 1616. Bermuda's Trott family descend from famous 17th-century settler Perient Trott (1614–1679), who led the campaign against the Somers Isles Company that would lead to its dissolution in 1684.

Tucker was educated at Whitney Institute and at Saltus Grammar School in Hamilton, before being sent at the age of 17, in 1920, to boarding school in England, where he attended Sherborne School in Dorset. Lacking the means to pursue university studies, he returned to Bermuda in 1922 to find work.

Tucker moved to New York City, where from 1924 until 1934, he worked for several banks and stock brokerages. Returning to Bermuda, he became an employee of the Bank of Bermuda. He was promoted to general manager in 1938. On his retirement in 1969, he was elected Deputy Chairman of the Board of Directors of the Bank of Bermuda, and would serve in this capacity until 1985.

== Politics ==
In 1938, Tucker was elected to Parliament as a representative in Paget. Tucker was elected to the Bermuda House of Assembly in the 1950s. He helped found the United Bermuda Party in 1964, after spending almost 20 years in the Assembly. He immediately became the UBP's leader. Tucker became Bermuda's first Premier in 1968, after the island's first election with universal suffrage.

Tucker resigned from office in 1971, citing his advancing age. He was knighted by Queen Elizabeth II in 1972.

Famous quote:

"A man without a conflict of interests is a man without any interests."

— Sir Henry Tucker, founder of the Bermuda Trust Company (attr)

== Death ==
Sir Henry Tucker died in Bermuda on 9 January 1986 at the age of 82. He is survived by two of his children, Robert Newbold Tucker, who currently lives in Bermuda, and daughter Judy Denney, who currently lives in Texas. His granddaughter, actress Joanne Tucker, is married to actor Adam Driver.

== Legacy ==
- On Bermuda's National Heroes Day in June 2011, Sir Henry Tucker was honoured as one of the architects of modern Bermuda.
- The Bank of Bermuda Foundation offers "Sir Henry Tucker University Scholarship and Education Grants" to help ensure the future of the island's youth.
