= Ewart Brown =

Bermudian politician (born 1946)

The Honourable Ewart Frederick Brown Jr. JP, MP
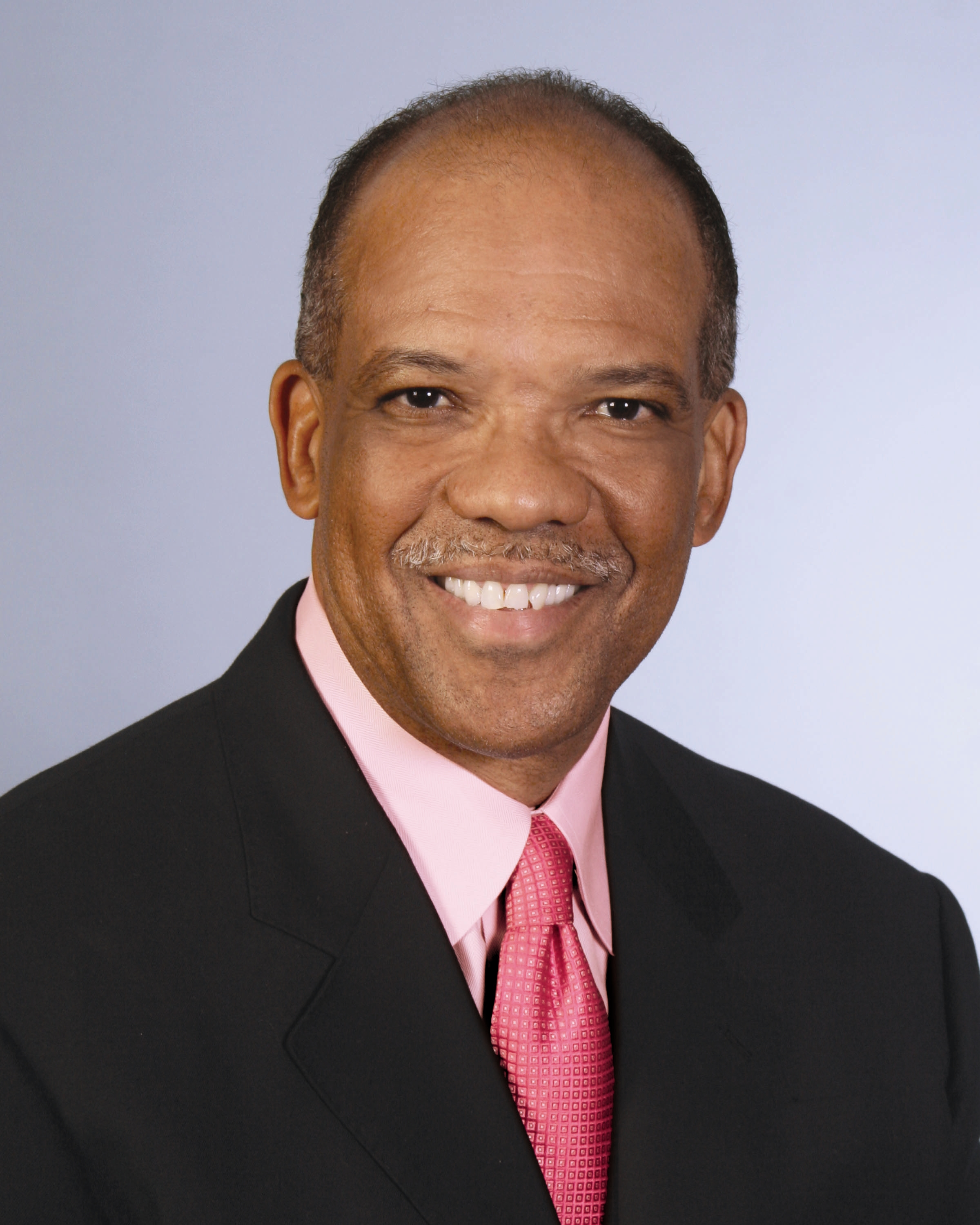

9th Premier of Bermuda
- In office 30 October 2006 – 28 October 2010
- Monarch: Elizabeth II
- Governor: Sir John Vereker; Mark Capes (acting); Sir Richard Gozney
- Preceded by: Alex Scott
- Succeeded by: Paula Cox
- Constituency: Warwick South Central (House of Assembly)

Personal details
- Born: 1946 (age 79–80) Bermuda
- Party: Progressive Labour Party
- Spouse: Wanda Henton Brown

Ewart Frederick Brown Jr. (born 1946) is a politician and physician who served as the ninth Premier of Bermuda and leader of the country's Progressive Labour Party (PLP) from 2006 to 2010. He represented Warwick South Central as a Member of Parliament from 1993 to 2010.

Born in Bermuda, Brown is a graduate of Howard University and the University of California at Los Angeles (UCLA). In 1966 he represented Bermuda at the Commonwealth Games in Jamaica.

Premier Brown was elected leader of the ruling Progressive Labour Party on 30 October 2006, defeating incumbent leader and Premier William Alexander Scott, at a PLP delegates conference. Brown won the vote 107 – 76. He was the seventh leader of the Progressive Labour Party and the third leader of that party since winning the 1998 general election. Under his leadership, Brown pledged to take Bermuda to the next level and to "lead Bermuda to greater health, happiness and prosperity for all of its people".

In the 2007 General Election the PLP defeated the United Bermuda Party for the third election in a row. Brown retired in October 2010. Since leaving office, Brown has returned to his medical practice as founder and Executive Chairman of Bermuda HealthCare Services and Brown-Darrell Clinic. He was charged with on 13 counts of corruption in January 2021.

== Early life ==
Brown was born in Bermuda to Ewart Sr. and Helene Brown of Flatts. His mother was a member of parliament for the United Bermuda Party (UBP), as was his aunt, Gloria Juanita McPhee, who became Bermuda's first female cabinet minister. He attended the public Central School (today known as Victor Scott Primary) in Pembroke until the age of 11, after which he attended Berkeley Institute. He eventually was sent by his parents to live with an aunt in Jamaica, where he excelled in sports, particularly cricket and track and field, while attending St Jago High School in Spanish Town, eventually representing that school in the 440-yard dash.

Brown's sporting achievements led him to university in the United States of America. The University of Illinois offered him a scholarship, but Brown chose instead to attend Howard University, a historically black university in Washington, D.C. In 1966, he represented Bermuda at the Commonwealth Games, reaching the second round of the 400-yard dash. As a student leader, he was a vocal figure during the Washington riots, speaking alongside campus activists and Black Panther leaders such as Stokely Carmichael. In 1968, Brown led a coalition of Howard University campus political organizations in a successful five-day takeover of the school's administration building. It was the first all-black seizure of a college administration building in the United States.

Brown decided to continue his education and become a doctor. He earned an M.D. from Howard's College of Medicine, and moved to Los Angeles to pursue a Master of Public Health from the University of California. His key areas of study included family medicine, population control and international health. Brown remained in Los Angeles, acquiring US citizenship and opening a medical practice, the Vermont Century Medical Clinic, in 1974.

In 1974 he became the first qualified doctor in 50 years to be turned down for a Bermuda Medical license to practice after failing the registration exam. Brown alleged that the powers that be deliberately gave him a failing grade for political reasons. He eventually received his license to practice in 1988, and set up Bermuda Healthcare Services in 1990, returning to the island permanently in 1993.

Brown became a director for the Marcus Garvey School, a K-8 school in Los Angeles, which named him Humanitarian of the Year in 1991. Brown has served as a trustee of both Howard University and Charles R. Drew University of Medicine and Science, and Assistant Professor of Drew University's Department of Family Practice. Brown is a former member of the Board of Directors of Marina Hills Hospital in Los Angeles, California; a former member of the California State Commission on Maternal, Child and Adolescent Health; and a founding Commissioner of the Board of Prevention Commissioners for South Central Los Angeles Regional Centre for Development Disabilities.

He was a founder and Chairman of the Board of Directors for Western Park Hospital in Los Angeles, California and served as Director of Quality Assurance for the Los Angeles Doctor's Hospital; Chairman of the Minority Group Affairs of the Student American Medical Association and as a Coordinator of the Summer Health Task Force of the National Urban Coalition in Washington D.C.; as Chairman of the Utilization Review Committee, West Adams Hospital, Los Angeles, California; and as Secretary of the Charles R Drew Medical Society in Los Angeles.

== Honors ==
Brown has been honored for his service to medicine and for his humanitarian and philanthropic efforts. He was recognized twice by Howard University's College of Medicine for distinguished service to the college. He received the Physicians Recognition Award in 1977 from the American Medical Association; the Grassroots Health Award from the Sons of Watts California in 1979; the Dubois Academic Institute's Community Leadership Award in 1982; the Pacesetter Award from the NAACP in 1984; Humanitarian of the Year Award from the Marcus Garvey School in Los Angeles in 1991; and in 1993, the Scroll Award from the Union of American Physicians and Dentists.

== Political life ==
At the urging of then-PLP leader L. Frederick Wade, Brown returned to Bermuda and became involved in local politics in 1993 to run as a candidate for the Opposition Progressive Labour Party. That year, he ran as a PLP candidate for one of the two Warwick West constituency's seats in the House of Assembly, facing the two incumbent UBP members of parliament: Quinton Edness and Sir John Sharpe, the former Premier. Brown finished only two votes behind Edness, unseating Sharpe by 14 votes. In Opposition, Brown first served as Shadow Minister for Youth and Sports and in 1995 became Shadow Minister for Human Affairs.

In the following general election in 1998, Brown again won one of the Warwick West seats, and was joined by El James during the PLP's historic victory over the UBP ending 30 years of United Bermuda Party rule. Brown was appointed the PLP's first Minister of Transport by Premier Jennifer Smith.

=== Minister of Transport ===
As Minister of Transport, Brown oversaw the public bus system, taxis, marine ports and ferries, vehicle licensing, and aviation. He introduced a number of reforms, including the completion of the oppositions plan for the replacement of the island's obsolescent ferries with faster, 205-seat catamarans, the Serenity and the Resolute, in 2002. In May of that year, he clashed with the taxi industry over his proposed legislation to require a GPS-based central despatching system, which was eventually passed into law four years later.

Air arrivals at Bermuda International Airport increased by 15 percent between 2003–2007, largely due to the introduction of low cost airline service in 2004, reversing a twenty-year decline from the 1980s. While James G. Howes was the general manager, the Bermuda International Airport was recognized as the best in the North American region for overall passenger satisfaction for both 2002 and 2003, as well as ninth in the world in 2002, for which the Brown threw a party for all of the airport employees and their families.

In October 2008, however, the Department of Statistics announced that visitor arrivals had plunged from the previous year to their second lowest level since 1980, saying "Air arrivals during the second quarter of 2008 [April–June] fell 10 percent compared to the same quarter last year... The number of visitors stood at 89,642 persons, representing the second lowest second quarter visitor total since 1980."

Cruise ship calls also declined from 181 in 2007, to 122 in 2008. In mid-2008, Brown put additional tourism promotional emphasis in the New York market (Bermuda's largest), resulting in a 27% increase in New York arrivals for December 2008 compared to December 2007, officials said. Overall, December 2008 arrivals were almost 7% higher than December 2007. The government projected 300,000 cruise visitors in 2009.

In 2004, Brown clashed with the US Consulate over what was alleged to be a "gross violation" of security at the Bermuda International Airport, when he was said to have avoided security screening procedures. Brown denied the claim, and criticized the consulate for making the issue public.

Following the PLP's second general election victory on 23 July 2003, Brown and ten PLP MPs refused to support PLP Leader Jennifer Smith as premier. She resigned on 28 July 2003, and following a special leadership conference of the PLP, William Alexander Scott was elected as leader of the party and premier. Brown was elected as Deputy Leader of Party and Deputy Premier of Bermuda. Responding to criticism that the leadership challenge was launched after the voters had already gone to the polls, Brown responded, "We had to mislead you." A compromise between the factions of the party led to Smith being replaced by William Alexander Scott and Brown being named Deputy Premier, and later adding the Ministry of Tourism to his portfolio.

=== Premier ===
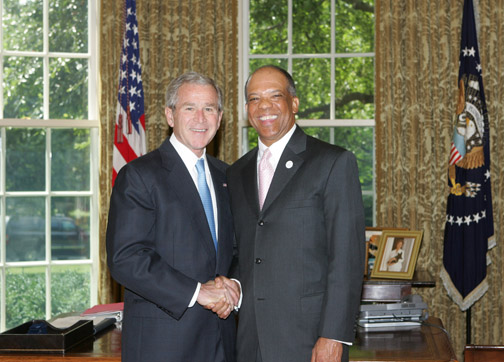
Brown with former US President George W. Bush in the Oval Office in 2008.

Brown never made a secret of his aspiration to lead Bermuda, telling a Howard University reporter in 2006, "I always wanted to seek the leadership of my country and I'm still in that process." On 12 October 2006, Brown resigned from cabinet to make a second bid for leadership. At a previously scheduled party delegates conference on the evening of 27 October, he defeated the incumbent, Scott, by 107 to 76, and was sworn in as Premier on 30 October. In a subsequent interview with the Bermuda Sun, he said, "I have worked hard, studied hard, and prepared for the task of leadership to the best of the abilities that God has given me."

When he reshuffled the cabinet, he reclaimed the tourism and transportation portfolios and became, in addition to Premier, the Minister of Tourism and Transport. Since then, the Bermuda Government has made a number of proposals, issuing a Vision Statement: Taking Bermuda to the next level. Current issues include indigent medical care, traffic congestion, environmental concerns over development and waste disposal, race relations, and independence.

On a private member bill concerning sexual orientation, Brown rejected the proposal, saying "I firmly believe in the right of all and any individuals to be free from discrimination in any form. However, I would not support the proposed Human Rights Amendment. I do not believe that there is a need for special protection of persons in Bermuda based on their sexual orientation". In April 2007, the government proposed restrictions on vehicle ownership, intended to curb Bermuda's growing road congestion problem. Among the solutions offered are free travel on buses and ferries. "There are too many cars in Bermuda. We must find a way – perhaps unpopular to many and disdained by others – to arrest the increase of cars on our beautiful island", he said.

Polls in 2007 and 2008 indicated that two-thirds of the island's voters remain opposed to severing ties for various reasons, including loss of EU-status (which Bermuda had as a British overseas territory). Undaunted, Premier Brown said "I am firmly committed to Bermuda becoming an independent nation." He has also spurned any participation in Whitehall's selection of the Governor of Bermuda, saying, "We want to clarify our position that we are not interested in sending any criteria for any future governors for selection for the reason we don't think it is our responsibility. [The British government] should send whoever they want to send."

On 2 November 2007, following the reading of the Throne Speech by Governor John Vereker, Premier Brown set 18 December 2007 as the date for Bermuda's general election. During the election campaign, the PLP government held a joint press conference with the Bermuda Police Service on 12 December 2007, where it was revealed that a bullet had been mailed to the Premier and was being viewed as a serious and credible threat. A police investigation was unable to determine the originator of the threat.

Race relations continue to be a vexing issue in Bermuda, occasionally leading to heated exchanges with the press and the opposition UBP in Parliament. Brown rejected inappropriate questions as "plantation questions". He later explained, "A plantation question is for me a question which conjures up images of the plantation: of a master-servant relationship, a man-boy relationship. A question that would be asked of a black politician and not a white one. I will continue to indicate to reporters if that is what a question is."

Responding to opposition criticism of his wife's fund-raising activities voiced in the House of Assembly, he bristled, "Mr. Speaker, I have never had plans to cross this aisle, but in recent weeks that Honourable Member has said a few things that would encourage me to do so. I say to that Honourable Member that I would like to stay on this side of the House and not have come to the other side because it wouldn't be in order to vote for the UBP."

He remained Premier in 2008, where he removed Neletha Butterfield, among others, from the Cabinet.

==== Acceptance of Uighur detainees ====
On 7 October 2008, Ricardo M. Urbina, a United States federal judge, ordered the immediate release of seventeen Chinese Uighurs from Guantánamo Bay Detention Camp (the Uighur detainees in Guantanamo). The United States had previously determined that the Uighurs were never terrorists, and it no longer considered them enemy combatants. Judge Urbina ruled that their detention is illegal because their indefinite detention was without cause.

The United States continued to detain the Uighurs, believing their lives would be in danger if they were released to China. There was considerable political pressure from members of Congress not to release the Uighurs in the United States, and the United States had a difficult time finding another country willing to accept them. Eventually, the Republic of Palau announced that it would accept the remaining Uighurs on a temporary basis.

In June 2009, Brown announced that he had secretly made a deal with the United States to accept four of the Uighurs, who arrived on the island over-night, on humanitarian grounds; he also promised to make them Bermudian nationals (see also: Belonger status). The agreement to accept the Uighurs angered the government of the United Kingdom, which was deliberately not informed about the proposed agreement.

The government of the United Kingdom maintains that it has the authority over the acceptance of the Uighurs because agreements between Bermuda and foreign nations are strictly under the United Kingdom's control; the government of Bermuda responded that the acceptance of the Uighurs is an immigration case and, thus, an internal matter.

The decision was kept secret from Brown's Cabinet (Deputy Premier Paula Cox claimed she had been "politically neutered"), the Governor and the Bermuda Police Service, which would be responsible for any security concerns.

The Opposition UBP tabled a motion of no confidence against Brown the next day, saying that the premier's actions violated the Constitution of Bermuda and bordered on dictatorship; Brown responded by saying that the "firestorm" "would pass" and that his position was not in danger, but that he regretted the response to his actions. The following week, a protest march was organised by a PLP member to oppose Brown's continuing premiership, which was dismissed by Brown.

=== Resignation ===
Brown had initially stated he only intended to serve one term as premier and announced to a party conference in October 2008 that he intended to step down as party leader and premier in October 2010. Fulfilling that campaign promise, Brown stepped down in October 2010. He was succeeded as leader of the PLP on 28 October 2010 by Paula Cox and in a by-election held on 14 December 2010 was succeeded as MP for Warwick South Central by PLP MP Marc Bean.

=== Commission of Inquiry ===
In June, 2011, a Commission of Inquiry was formed to investigate allegations of financial improprieties regarding Brown's medical practice and a subsequent Auditor General's report of financial irregularities during Brown's term in government. On February 11, 2017, the Bermuda Police Service raided Brown's Bermuda businesses as part of their ongoing investigation into corruption and fraud.

He owns two medical clinics, Bermuda Healthcare Services in Paget Parish and the Brown-Darrell Clinic in Smith's Parish, which could receive more than $1.2 million from taxpayers as compensation for the cuts in fees for medical scans imposed by the One Bermuda Alliance administration in 2017, said to be contrary to the advice of the Bermuda Health Council. He was charged on 13 counts of corruption in January 2021.

== Memoirs ==
Brown's son, Kevin, was charged with multiple offenses regarding sexual misconduct while working as a doctor. He was subsequently sentenced to twelve years imprisonment. https://bernews.com/2011/12/dr-kevin-brown-sentenced-to-jail/#:~:text=Kevin%20Brown%20was%20sentenced%20to,life%20as%20a%20sex%20offender.

His other son was sentenced to 10 years for armed robbery.

In November 2019, the publication of Brown's autobiography, Whom Shall I Fear? Pushing the Politics of Change, was announced. Brown said he wrote the book because, "... the Bermuda public in particular has been told a plethora of falsehoods about me. They have witnessed character assassination. I was determined to give them my side."
