= Lois Browne-Evans =

Bermudian politician

Dame Lois Browne-Evans after being invested as Dame Commander of the Order of the British Empire

Dame Lois Marie Browne-Evans DBE JP (1 June 1927 – 29 May 2007) was a lawyer and political figure in Bermuda. She led the Progressive Labor Party (PLP) in opposition before being appointed Bermuda's first female Attorney-General. She first gained recognition in 1953 as Bermuda's first female barrister. Browne-Evans died of a suspected stroke on 29 May 2007 at age 79.

== Background ==
Browne-Evans was educated at King's College London and became Bermuda's first female barrister in 1953 after being called to the bar at Middle Temple in June 1953. She was the first black woman to be elected to the House of Assembly of Bermuda, defeating the long-serving incumbent Sir Bayard Dill, becoming the Member of Parliament (MP) for the Devonshire North constituency in 1963. Five years later she became the leader of the PLP, gaining worldwide recognition as the first female Leader of the Opposition in the British Commonwealth. In 1972 she stepped down as leader but took on the role of Jamaica's Honorary Consul in Bermuda, the first Bermudian to serve in that capacity. From 1976 to 1985 she again led the PLP in opposition.

In 1998, the PLP achieved its first electoral victory. Browne-Evans was appointed Minister of Legislative Affairs and became the country's first female Attorney-General in 1999. That year, she circumvented a party ban on accepting British honors when she accepted the title of Dame Commander of the Order of the British Empire from Queen Elizabeth II, forcing the PLP to abandon its boycott.

She debated at the London and Bermuda Constitutional Conferences and served as delegate to numerous international conferences in Africa, New Zealand, the US and the Caribbean. Outside politics Browne-Evans was a member of the International Federation of Women Lawyers and a founding member of the Bermuda Business and Professional Women's Club. She was the first female member of the Devonshire Recreation Club and a founding partner of Browne & Wade Chambers in Hamilton.

== Position on independence ==
Despite her damehood, Lois Browne-Evans said after a keynote address by Premier Alex Scott at a Founder's Day Luncheon in 2004 that Bermuda would achieve independence from the UK within five years.

== Family ==
Lois Marie Browne was born on Parson's Road, Pembroke, one of four children of James Browne, a contractor and owner of the Clayhouse Inn, and his wife Emmeline (née Charles). Her parents and grandparents emigrated to Bermuda from Nevis and St. Kitts in 1914, part of a large influx of West Indians that had begun in the latter years of the 19th century.

She married Trinidadian-born John Evans in 1958, and the couple had three children: Ernestine, Donald, and Nadine. John Evans co-founded, in 1976, the West Indian Association of Bermuda.

== Legacy ==
Several months after her death, the PLP government under Premier Dr. Ewart Brown decided that a planned new police station/courthouse would be named after Browne-Evans. In 2008, Brown's government created a National Heroes Day holiday to commemorate Browne-Evans, intended to replace the existing national holiday Bermuda Day (later changed to replace the Queen's Official Birthday).

== See also ==
- First women lawyers around the world
