= Progressive Labour Party (Bermuda) =

- Leader: E. David Burt
- Chairperson: Scott Simmons
- Deputy Leader: Walter Roban
- Founded: 10 February 1963
- Headquarters: Alaska Hall, 16 Court Street, Hamilton, Bermuda
- Ideology: Social democracy Social conservatism Bermudian Independence (Since Burt)
- Political position: Centre-left
- Senate: 5 / 11
- Assembly: 25 / 36

Website
- http://www.plp.bm

The Progressive Labour Party (PLP) is one of the three political parties in Bermuda. At the 18 July 2017 general election, the party won 24 of the 36 seats in the Bermudian House of Assembly to become the governing party. The party was founded in 1963, the first political party in Bermuda, and the oldest still active. It formed government from 1998 to 2012, and again since 2017.

== Formation ==
The Progressive Labour Party was founded in 1963 by Wilfred Mose Allen, Hugh Ryo Richardson, Albert Peter Smith, Edward DeJean, Walter N.H. Robinson, Austin Wilson and Dilton C. Cann. These seven had earlier met in Richardson's garage, before holding the first formal meeting of the PLP on 10 February 1963 in Robinson's office in Hamilton.

The party contested the 1963 election just three months after its formation. Appealing to working-class voters, the first election platform called for equitable taxation, an end to racial discrimination, economic parity and welfare programs, as well as housing, educational and electoral reform. The party contested nine of the 36 House of Assembly seats. The PLP's six successful members of parliament were Arnold A. Francis (Party Leader), Walter N. H. Robinson (Deputy Leader), Lois Browne-Evans (Bermuda's first black elected woman Member of Parliament), Russell Dismont, Cecil Clarke and Dorothy Thompson.

Bermuda received its first constitution in 1968, and an election was called on 22 May 1968. In the election, the party was soundly defeated winning only 10 of 40 seats by the conservative United Bermuda Party which was founded in 1964. During the election, the party's leader, Walter Robinson, was defeated in his constituency and Lois Browne-Evans became party leader, the first female opposition leader in the British Commonwealth.

In subsequent elections, the PLP slowly increased its seat numbers. At the 1972 general election, the PLP increased its share of the popular vote from 33% to 38%. The party again contested every constituency. With the successful re-election of Walter Robinson, Lois Browne-Evans yielded the leadership of the party back to him. The party retained ten seats in the House. In April 1976, Robinson retired from active politics, later becoming a Puisne Judge, and Browne-Evans became the Party Leader for the second time as well as the Opposition Leader.

In the 1980 general election, the party ran 40 candidates and won 18 seats and 46% of the votes, just three short of the number needed to form government. There was steady progress until 1983, when a noticeable slide began. In 1983, the party had to fight a snap general election. Once again, the party ran 40 candidates, contesting every seat. The PLP lost four seats in this election, gaining only 43.4% of the votes. Another snap general election was called in November 1985. A small, but determined PLP contested 18 of the 20 constituencies, fielding 30 candidates.

The party had been gripped in the legacy of a severe split between a group led by veteran parliamentarian Gilbert Darrell and those loyal to Party Leader Lois Browne-Evans. This division resulted in a group being expelled from the party. The party split had affected the electorate which was reflected in the party's further loss of seats and only 31% of the votes. The party won only seven seats.

Lois Browne-Evans stepped down as Party Leader. At the special Delegates Conference, convened 72 hours after the election, Deputy Leader, L. Frederick Wade became the PLP's fourth Party Leader with Walter Roberts as the new Deputy Leader. Wade, committed the party to a period of rebuilding and the reversal experienced in the previous elections. A rejuvenated PLP was ready for the general election of 1989. The party contested all 20 constituencies and regained eight seats to increase the number of PLP representatives to 15 and an increase of 37% of the votes cast. The process of rebuilding continued with the party regaining the confidence of its supporters and building new bridges with the electorate. Wade also began making inroads with the business community.

At the 1993 general election, called for October 1993, Wade led a well-prepared PLP. The Party contested all 20 constituencies and gained three seats to increase the number of PLP representatives to 18. In the election the party once again approached the threshold of victory with 46.7% of the votes cast.

== Recent history ==
In 1996 Jennifer Meredith Smith succeeded to the leadership of the PLP upon the death of L. Frederick Wade. Smith immediately set about establishing her mandate for the party with an agenda to get the organisation ready for the next general election, due to be held no later than October 1998.

Under her leadership the party continued working to rebuild and strengthen the party apparatus. In addition, the PLP entered into an aggressive fundraising campaign, expanding its appeal to not only traditional supporters but also the business sector. The interaction with the business community, started under L.F. Wade continued - raising the Party's credentials as a future government that would work to ensure a sound business environment.

On 20 October 1998, the date of the much-anticipated general election was announced as 9 November 1998. The party won 26 seats and 54.3% of votes to form government, in the first change of government in Bermuda's history. Jennifer Smith led the party to its first victory against the conservative United Bermuda Party, which had controlled the territory since universal franchise and a constitution was gained in 1968, but was split by bitter infighting resulting from Premier Sir John W. Swan's forcing a referendum in 1995 on independence from the United Kingdom (74.12% voted against independence, resulting in the resignation of Swan and his cabinet and - along with further UBP infighting due to the attempt by Swan and his partners to take over and continue to operate a McDonald's franchise on the United States Naval Air Station Bermuda, in contravention to Bermudian law, after the United States Navy withdrew from Bermuda in 1995 - fatally injuring the United Bermuda Party).

The party having achieved the goal of the founding fathers and reached the pinnacle of electoral success set about the mission of building 'A New Bermuda.' Immediately, the government moved to make substantive changes in key areas, including: amendment to the Election Act eliminating annual voter registration; the introduction of the political office of Attorney General which required the establishment of Office of Director of Public Prosecutions (DPP) as the chief law officer responsible for Crown prosecutions. Another change was the re-introduction of bi-weekly garbage collection. On 18 August 2000, Premier Jennifer Smith tabled a paper, proposing constitutional amendments, including the establishment of single-seat constituencies. This was in keeping with a PLP platform initiative to ensuring that Bermuda's democracy enshrined the principle of "one person, one vote; each vote of equal value". This goal had been consistently stated from the establishment of the PLP in 1963 under the objective of constitutional reform. In November 2000, the Party Leader faced a challenge to her leadership by Environment Minister Arthur Hodgson. The Party Leader defeated Hodgson by a vote of 2 to 1.

On 11 October 2002 the House of Assembly passed the Boundaries Commission Report which included recommendations for 36 single seat constituencies. In November 2002, Premier Jennifer Smith tabled a motion in the House of Assembly that the Government empower a Committee to examine the Parliamentary Election Act with a view to making recommendations about the wider questions of the voting franchise in Bermuda.

On 28 February 2003, an Order-in-Council was made at Buckingham Palace ratifying the recommendations of the commission to the Governor and the Secretary of State for Foreign and Commonwealth Affairs. The Order came into effect in mid-March 2003 setting the stage for the next General Election, with a single seat constituency system established in Bermuda.

A discussion paper on the wider question of the franchise looking at broader questions for reform of Bermuda's voting system was submitted to the Parliament. The paper was consistent with the party's long-standing commitment to examine the larger question of reform of Bermuda's voting system. In June 2003, further parliamentary reform was completed, with amendments to the Parliamentary Election Act widening the categories of valid identification voters could use during an election. This would modernize requirements and contribute to more flexibility and ease in the voting process for all.

On 11 June 2003 the Premier announced that she would ask the Governor to dissolve Parliament in order to have a general election on 24 July 2003.

The party again won the election on 24 July 2003 with 51.6% of the vote and 22 out of 36 seats, but less than a week later Ewart Brown led a party coup, and Smith was forced to resign. The two factions agreed to a compromise candidate, Alex Scott, to become Premier of Bermuda, while Brown would hold the deputy premiership.

On 28 July 2003, Jennifer Smith submitted her resignation as Premier to His Excellency the Governor. W. Alexander Scott is not long after sworn in as Premier and on 30 July 2003, the New Cabinet was sworn in at Government House. The new Premier immediately moved to unify the Party and to reassure the country in the new government. In early September, the new PLP government was tested with the first national crisis in the form of Hurricane Fabian. The natural disaster devastated much of the island but the quick and effective response by the Government was praised by all quarters of the community.

In November 2004, the Throne Speech detailed a comprehensive initiative by the Government described as The Social Agenda. This Agenda revealed new initiatives designed to be a key part of the Government's blueprint for social change. Some of the highlights are:

- New plans for EMERGENCY housing with the Government to construct two, three and four bedroom manufactured emergency homes;
- A longer-term strategy will see the renovation of derelict and vacant premises to increase the number of houses available to rent or buy;
- An amendment to the customs tariff to reduce the cost of importing building materials;
- A new points system to deal with reckless drivers and new British style de-merit points; system will be introduced in a bid to rid the country's roads of irresponsible motorists;
- Tougher sentences for drug offenders;
- A recycled personal computer initiative will attempt to put computers "within the grasp of all Bermudians";
- Diversify the types of hotels on offer as well as pursuing business outside the traditional U.S. market in Europe

The protection of the environment and sustainable development is not only a global issue but also an important local concern. On 6 December 2004, Premier Scott announced that the Government would develop a Sustainable Development Plan for Bermuda. The Premier noted that it was time for us to ensure that development in this country is sustainable in order to provide a foundation for a better quality of life for everyone, now, and for generations to come.

In December 2004, Premier, the Hon. W. Alexander Scott JP, MP announced the formation of the Bermuda Independence Commission, an independent body of persons drawn from the widest, most representative cross-section of individuals, groups, unions and organisations in Bermuda. The Bermuda Independence Commission would have the express purpose of educating, informing and encouraging discussion and debate on the subject of Independence for Bermuda. The commission would also prepare a report with recommendation on the subject of Independence.

Premier Scott appointed the Sustainable Development Round Table (SDRT) in April 2005, to facilitate broad community engagement and representation in sustainable development decisions facing the future of Bermuda.

In August 2005, the long-awaited Bermuda Independence Commission Report was released to the public. Its release ignites a flurry of debate and discussion in the community on the report's findings from pro Independence and anti Independence advocates. The question and merits of an Independence referendum also enters into the debate. From February to May 2006, the Party held a series of meetings throughout the island to promote understanding of the findings of the Bermuda Independence Commission (BIC) and the issue of Independence. Overall, the meetings were well attended but support for the island moving towards independence remained elusive.

In late August 2006, speculation and discussion arose as to whether there was to be a leadership challenge at the upcoming Party Conference in light of the fact that it is an election year for all Party Officers. A leading contender was Tourism and Transport Minister Ewart F. Brown. It was also suggested another leading possible contestant was Finance Minister the Hon Paula Cox.

On 13 October 2006, the rumours of an impending leadership contest were settled when Brown announced his resignation from the Cabinet and that he would contest the leadership of the party at the upcoming Delegates Conference. Brown also stated that if the party chose the current Party Leader, W. Alexander Scott over him, he would resign from politics at the next election. On 27 October 2006, Brown defeated Scott in an election for Party Leader and became the PLP's Leader and Premier of Bermuda. Newly appointed Premier Brown and his Cabinet moved quickly to engage the public on key issues, particularly education, health and social issues.

The Throne Speech delivered 4 November 2006 pledges the Government would implement new, strong and significant programmes to address housing, education, healthcare, the quality of life for our youth and our elderly, alcohol and drug abuse, crime and race relations.

Following through with a promise made during Dr. Brown's leadership campaign, it is announced in the Throne Speech, that the Medical Clinic (formerly known as the Indigent Clinic) will be closed. The position is taken that it undermines the patients' dignity being treated in this manner. Under the new plans, patients will have access to the same services as the general public with at least 30 private doctors.

Some of the other initiatives that were highlighted in the 2006 Throne Speech are as follows:

- Establish a Ministry for Social Rehabilitation, focused on quickly implementing solutions to the challenges that exist in our community.
- Renew the Government commitment to producing 330 units in 30 months with 286 units under contract.
- Work with the private sector to generate progressive ways to finance new homes.
- Assemble the best legal and financial minds to determine how to renovate derelict homes for rent or ownership by deserving families.
- Introduce an income-based housing programme.
- Provide a zero rate of Customs Duty on imported materials for all proposals approved by the Government as 'affordable housing developments'.
- An Agricultural and Educational Outreach Programme to be implemented to familiarise senior secondary school students with farming.
- Shift the focus from where the new hospital would be and work with the medical community to establish the priorities for healthcare in Bermuda.
- Declare the Economic Empowerment Zone in North Hamilton as an 'approved scheme' under the Industrial Development Act 1968.

In December 2006, Premier Brown stated he was "deeply and seriously" concerned about the state of education and that within the near future Bermuda would hear "some very significant statements" about what was planned to improve attainment levels.

In May 2007, a report was given to the public on the findings of the Education Review and it revealed serious challenges in Bermuda's public Education system. The report outlined recommendations which the PLP Government committed to implementing.

The prospects of an election once again become apparent when starting in early July 2007 the party began announcing its candidate line up for the future election. On 2 November 2007, to the surprise of many, just hours after the Throne Speech, Premier Brown announced that he visited the Governor and requested he prorogue the Parliament in order to hold a general election dated Tuesday 18 December 2007. The six weeks leading up to the election was filled with a great deal of energy and sometimes-confrontational rhetoric between the completing parties. The campaign slogan for a third consecutive victory was, 'Moving Bermuda Forward' with a mission to make it 'Three Straight!!!’ Another effective campaign tag line promoted across the island was 'PLP Solid!’ The party focused its energy and resources on saturating the political landscape; proving the party was the dominant force in the country for progress and change.

The PLP won a third term in power in the election held on 18 December 2007, again taking 22 seats. Not only did the party successfully keep its majority, it managed to increase its percentage of the popular vote from 51.6% to 52.5%.

Brown quit elected politics in October 2010 and he was succeeded as party leader and Premier by Paula Cox.

Widely blamed for worsening the effects of the 2008 global recession through ineptitude and corruption, on 17 December 2012, the party, which had also angered many Bermudians through its stoking racial division while in Government, narrowly lost a general election to the One Bermuda Alliance; Cox lost her own seat and resigned as party leader the following day. She was replaced by Marc Bean, the former Minister of the Environment, Planning and Infrastructure. However future Minister of Health, Kim Wilson, was elected to parliament in December 2012, representing the party in the constituency of Sandys South Central.

On 15 February 2013, Terry Lister announced his resignation from the party, and his intention to continue to sit in the House of Assembly as an independent. Lister resigned from Parliament in September 2014, prompting a by-election. On 19 November 2014 the PLP's Candidate Jamahl Simmons defeated the OBA's Georgia Marshall.

== Election results ==
Election	Party leader	Votes			Seats			Position	Government
Election	Party leader	No.	%	±	No. of candidates	No. of seats won	±	Position	Government
1963	Arnold Francis	5,827	18.62%	—	36	6 / 36	—	1st	Independents
1968	Walter Robinson				40	10 / 40	▲4	▼2nd	UBP
1972	Lois Browne-Evans	13,018	38.23%		40	10 / 40	Steady	2nd	UBP
1976	Lois Browne-Evans	16,426	44.43%	▲6.20	39	14 / 40	▲4	2nd	UBP
1980	Lois Browne-Evans	22,452	46.02%	▲1.59	40	18 / 40	▲4	2nd	UBP
1983	Lois Browne-Evans	20,765	43.40%	▼2.38	40	14 / 40	▼4	2nd	UBP
1985	Lois Browne-Evans	10,930	30.54%	▼12.86	40	7 / 40	▼7	2nd	UBP
1989	L. Frederick Wade	15,548	36.71%	▲6.17	30	15 / 40	▲8	2nd	UBP
1993	L. Frederick Wade	23,168	45.84%	▲9.13	40	18 / 40	▲3	2nd	UBP
1998	Jennifer M. Smith	30,422	54.57%	▲8.73	40	26 / 40	▲8	▲1st	PLP
2003	Jennifer M. Smith	14,868	50.50%	▲4.07	36	22 / 36	▼4	1st	PLP
2007	Ewart Brown	16,800	52.45%	▼1.95	36	22 / 36	Steady	1st	PLP
2012	Paula Cox	14,218	46.08%	▼6.37	36	17 / 36	▼5	▼2nd	OBA
2017	Edward David Burt	20,059	58.88%	▲12.8	36	24 / 36	▲7	▲1st	PLP
2020	Edward David Burt	15,995	62.09%	▲3.10	36	30 / 36	▲6	1st	PLP
2025	Edward David Burt	12,300	49.64%	▼12.45	36	25 / 36	▼5	1st	PLP
