= United Bermuda Party =

- Founded: 21 August 1964
- Dissolved: 30 June 2011
- Merged into: One Bermuda Alliance
- Headquarters: Bermudiana Arcade; Queen Street; Hamilton, Bermuda
- Ideology: Conservative liberalism
- Political position: Centre to centre-right

The United Bermuda Party (UBP) was a political party in Bermuda, which represented itself as centrist party with a moderate social and fiscal agenda. The party held power in Bermuda's House of Assembly continuously from 1968 to 1998, the 47-year-old party was dissolved on 30 June 2011 after the majority of its members joined the One Bermuda Alliance.

== History ==
=== Foundation and government, 1964–1998 ===
The United Bermuda Party was founded on 21 August 1964, by 24 members of Bermuda's Parliament, following the formation of the Progressive Labour Party the previous year. Sir Henry Tucker became the leader of the new party. The party won 30 of the 40 seats at the 1968 election and formed the first government and Tucker was appointed Bermuda's first Premier. under Bermuda's new constitution and universal adult suffrage. The party was loosely modelled on the UK's Conservative Party.

From 1968 until 1998, the UBP won 8 straight elections. The 1970s saw the UBP majority in Parliament decline as the PLP grew in strength. This trend was halted when Sir John Swan became party leader and Premier on 15 January 1982. Under Swan's leadership, the second black man to lead the party, the UBP control of Parliament strengthened at the 1983 and 1985 elections (where it reached an all-time high of 31 seats), though this trend ended at the 1989 election.

The 1990s were a troubling time for the party as the PLP increasingly gained seats. Following the 1993 election, the UBP held 22 seats. In 1995, Swan held a referendum on independence, which was soundly defeated. He had promised to resign if the measure was defeated as a sign of his support for the issue, and kept his word. He was replaced by David Saul, who was soon replaced by Pamela Gordon, Bermuda's youngest Premier, and the first woman to hold the office.

=== Opposition and disbanding, 1998–2011 ===
At the 1998 election, the PLP defeated the UBP for the first time, marking the first time in over 30 years that the UBP was not in power. At the 2003 election, the party won 48.0% of popular votes and 14 out of 36 seats under the leadership of Grant Gibbons. In January 2006, Gibbons was replaced by Wayne Furbert, who was unanimously selected as the new party leader. On 3 April 2007, Michael Dunkley replaced Furbert as party leader. Dunkley lost his seat at the 2007 election, and was replaced as leader by Kim Swan. The party's deputy leader was long-standing maverick MP Trevor Moniz, a recognised champion of Bermuda's Portuguese community.

On 3 May 2011, the UBP executive voted to merge with the Bermuda Democratic Alliance (BDA), to form the One Bermuda Alliance (OBA). However, leader Kim Swan refused to join after the executive failed to allow a disputes tribunal under the United Bermuda Party constitution to take place, and was granted an injunction in the courts. In response, seven UBP MPs resigned from the UBP and joined with the sitting BDA members under the OBA banner. While Kim Swan and Charles Swan remained as UBP Members of Parliament, the OBA replaced the UBP as the official opposition party. On 29 June 2011, the UBP announced that its offices would close and it would cease to operate on the following day.

=== Revival attempt, 2011–2012 ===
In November 2011, the two remaining UBP MPs, Kim Swan and Charlie Swan, announced their intention to revive the UBP and to have it contest the next Bermudian election. The party's website was updated and election posters prepared. The two MPs were the only two announced candidates for the party. A March 2012 poll reported that the revived party had about 1% of voter support. When an election was called for 17 December 2012, Kim and Charlie Swan announced they would run as independent candidates, effectively ending the revival attempt. Neither won their seats.

== Leaders of the United Bermuda Party ==
	Entered office	Left office
Henry Tucker	1964	1971
Edward Richards	1971	1976
John Sharpe	1976	1977
David Gibbons	1977	1982
John Swan	1982	1995
David Saul	1995	1997
Pamela Gordon	1997	2001
Grant Gibbons	2001	2006
Wayne Furbert	2006	2007
Michael Dunkley	2007	2007
Kim Swan	2007	2011

== Platform ==
The United Bermuda Party's stated core objectives were:

1. To promote Bermuda's social, moral, economic and political welfare.
2. To develop Bermuda's unity and understanding.
3. The ensure freedom and opportunity.
4. To enforce the rights granted by the Bermuda Constitution.
5. To maintain economic and political stability under a free market economy.
6. To provide a sound, responsible and democratic government.
