= House of Assembly of Bermuda =

Lower house of the Parliament of Bermuda

- 12th Modern Bermudian Parliament

Type
- Type: Lower house of the Parliament of Bermuda

History
- Founded: 1 August 1620 (original unicameral house); 2 June 1968 (modern bicameral Parliament)

Leadership
- Speaker: Dennis Lister, PLP since 8 September 2017
- Deputy Speaker: Lovitta Foggo, PLP since 18 February 2025
- Premier: Edward David Burt, PLP since 19 July 2017
- Leader of the Opposition: Cole Simons, OBA since 2 November 2020

Structure
- Seats: 36 MPs
- House political groups: His Majesty's Government: Progressive Labour Party (PLP) (25); His Majesty's Loyal Opposition: One Bermuda Alliance (OBA) (11)

Elections
- House voting system: First-past-the-post
- Last House election: 18 February 2025
- Next House election: 2030

Meeting place
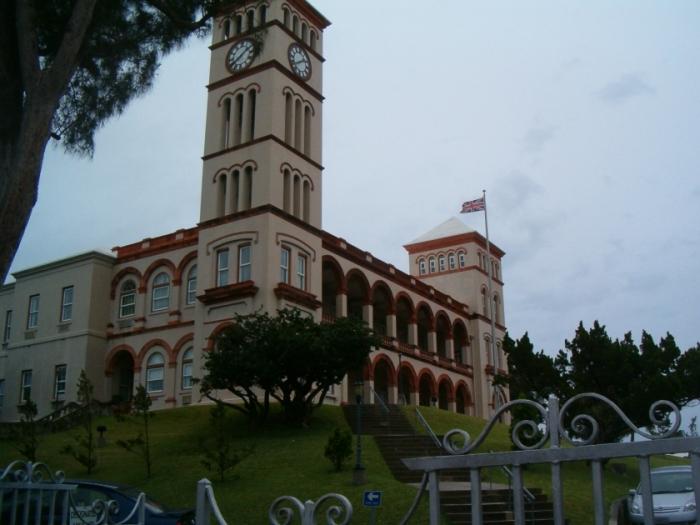
- The Sessions House, home of the House of Assembly in Hamilton since 1826.

Website
- parliament.bm

The House of Assembly is the lower house of the Parliament of the British Overseas Territory of Bermuda. The house has 36 Members of Parliament (MPs), elected for a term of five years in 36 single-seat constituencies using first-past-the-post voting. Bermuda now has universal voting with a voting age of 18 years. Voting is non-compulsory. The presiding officer of the House is called the Speaker.

== Term and election date ==
Under section 49(2) of the Bermuda Constitution Order 1968, the Parliament of Bermuda must be dissolved by the Governor five years after its first meeting following the previous elections (unless the Premier advises the Governor to dissolve parliament sooner). Under section 51(1) of the Constitution, a general election must be held no later than three months after a dissolution.

The House can force the resignation of the government by passing a vote of no-confidence in the government.

== History ==
The House of Assembly was originally the only house of Bermuda's Parliament, and held its first session in 1620. It first met in Saint Peter's Church, located in the original colonial capital, Saint George's, until its own building, the State House, was completed, also in 1620. It met in the State House until the capital was moved to Hamilton in 1815, where it met at the old town hall until relocating to its current home, the Sessions House, in 1826.

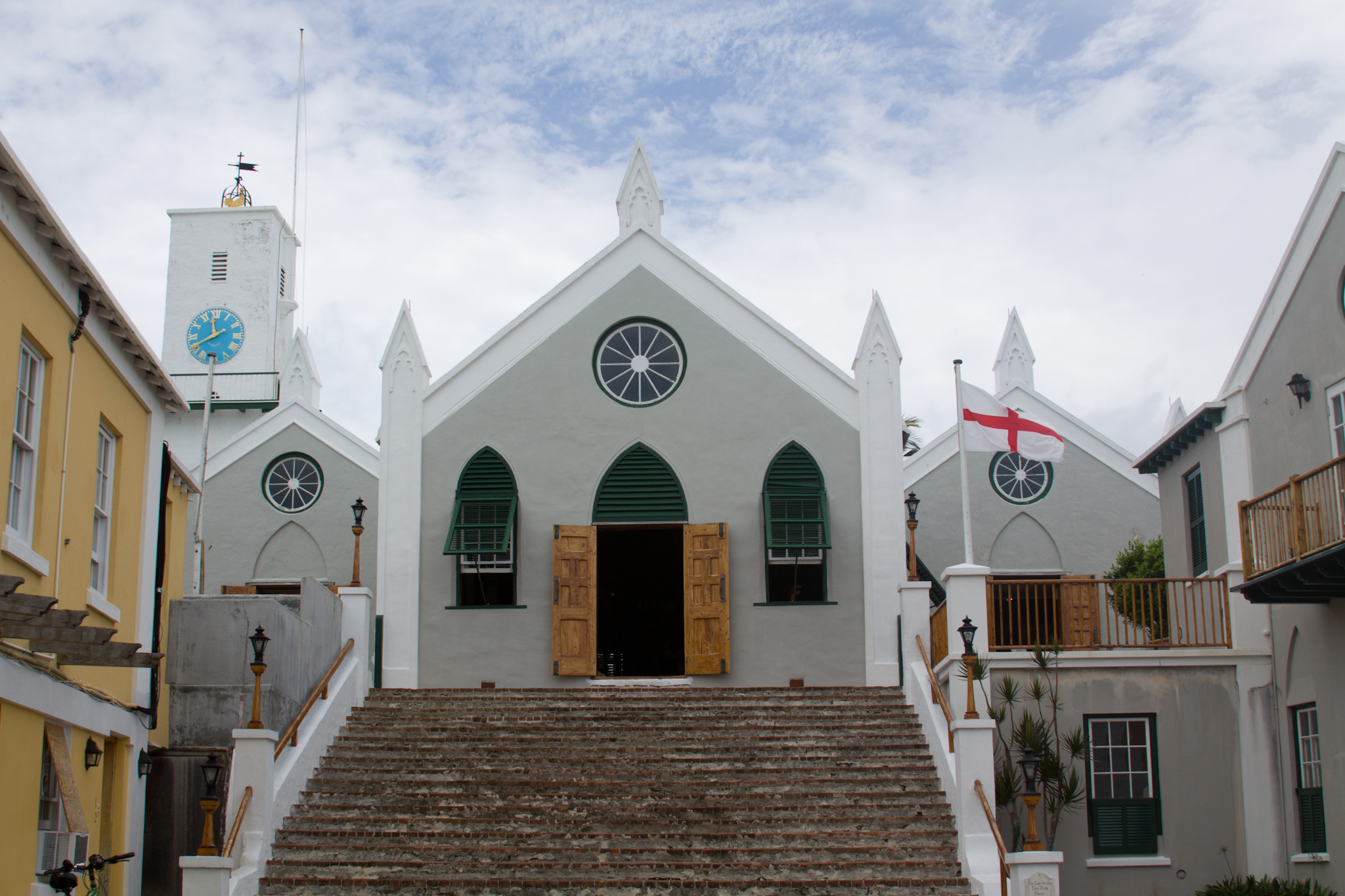
St. Peter's Church, where the House of Assembly held its first session on the 1 August 1620.

The House of Assembly was created at a time when Bermuda, or The Somers Isles, was administered by the Somers Isles Company (1615–1684), an offshoot of the Virginia Company. The House of Burgesses had been created in Virginia in 1619.

The House of Assembly was overseen by a Governor appointed by the Company (from 1684, by the Crown), although, for much of the colony's history, the real political power lay with the appointed Council of Bermuda, composed of members of Bermuda's wealthy merchant class.

During periods when the colony was without a Governor, the President of the Council might find himself Acting Governor, also. The balance of power began to shift away from the Council in the 19th Century, when Bermuda assumed a new importance in Imperial security, and when the Governor became also the Commander-in-Chief of the new naval establishment and newly re-established and greatly expanded military garrison.

This reflected the increasing importance placed on Bermuda by the Imperial government following the loss of continental bases between Nova Scotia and the West Indies, and the threat to the Empire posed by the new United States. The British Government came to view Bermuda more as a base than as a colony, but still had to negotiate with, beg and cajole the Government of Bermuda to aid its plans (this was especially obvious in the complete refusal of the House of Assembly to pass a Militia Act between 1815 and 1892, as well as its reluctance to commit colonial funds to the cost of defence).

Following revisions made to Bermuda's parliamentary system in the 1960s, the two roles once performed by the dissolved Council are now performed by an appointed upper house, the Senate, and a Cabinet, which is composed of Ministers appointed from elected Members of Parliament from the House of Assembly.

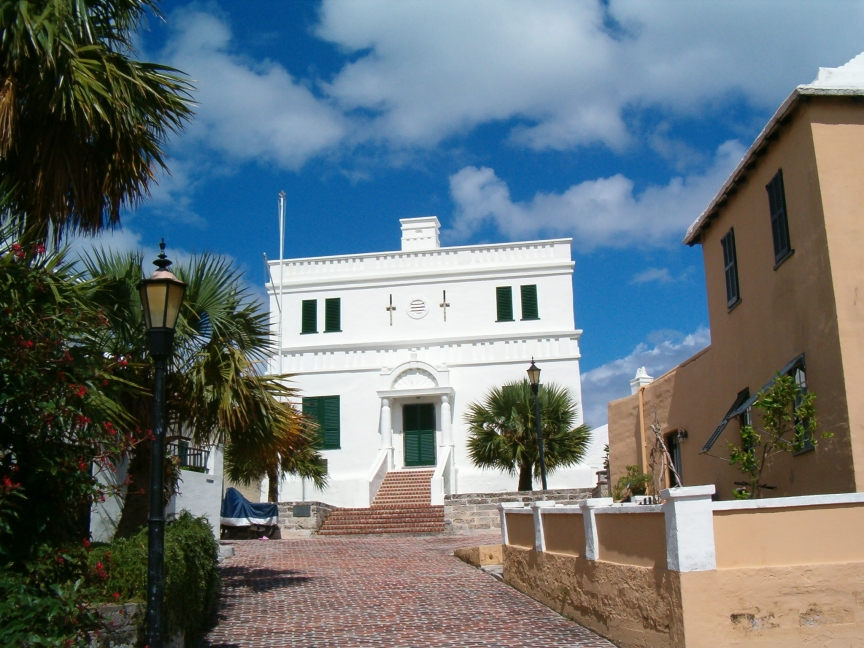
The State House, the home of Bermuda's parliament in St. George's from 1620 until the capital's relocation to Hamilton in 1815. Picture taken in 2006

This was only one of the changes made in the 1960s, largely as a result of the civil rights movement. A constitution was introduced which made Bermuda's parliamentary system more like the Westminster system. Political parties were legalised, and the system of a responsible government, from which a Premier and Cabinet Ministers were drawn from the parliament was adopted. The Senate was created to perform a function akin to that of the House of Lords, in London, although its members were appointed, rather than being hereditary, noble peers. The system of suffrage, by which the members of the lower house were elected, and which, as in Britain, had historically been limited to male landowners, was finally extended to all adults: universal adult suffrage.

Although non-white males had not been explicitly banned from either voting or standing for election, the land-owning requirement had effectively barred all but a few from voting. When the numbers of non-white land owners had increased, a minimum property value had been added. A male could vote in each of the nine parishes in which he held property of sufficient value.

The first non-white to stand for election was schoolmaster Augustus Henry Swan (-1866), who owned two houses and dry goods stores in Hamilton and Flatts. He was part of a coalition that pledged black support for white candidates Samuel Nash (1795-1857), Ambrose Gosling (1787-1857) and Richard Jennings Peniston Darrell (1808-1895), in exchange for white support of Swan, but the plan failed and none of these candidates won a seat. The first non-white person to actually gain a seat in the House of Assembly was William Henry Thomas Joell, elected MCP for Pembroke in May, 1883, and who died in 1886 while still holding his seat. He was replaced by John Henry Thomas Jackson, who was also non-white. Bermudian women acquired the vote and the ability to stand for election only in 1944.

Changes in 1976 saw the vote restricted to Bermudians, whether Bermudian by birth or by grant of Bermudian status, although other British and Commonwealth citizens who were registered to vote before that date remain enfranchised. In the 1980s, the voting age was lowered from 21 to 18 years of age.

== Make-up of the House ==
| Party | Votes | % | Seats | +/– |
|---|---|---|---|---|
| Progressive Labour Party | 20,059 | 58.89 | 24 | +7 |
| One Bermuda Alliance | 13,832 | 40.61 | 12 | -7 |
| Independents | 169 | 0.5 | 0 | 0 |
| Total | 30,862 | 100 | 36 | 0 |
| Registered voters | 46,669 | | – | – |
Source: Parliamentary Registry

== See also ==
- List of speakers of the House of Assembly of Bermuda
- Politics of Bermuda
