= 1990 New Year Honours =

British royal recognitions

The New Year Honours 1990 were appointments by most of the Commonwealth realms of Queen Elizabeth II to various orders and honours to reward and highlight good works by citizens of those countries, and honorary ones to citizens of other countries. They were announced on 30 December 1989 to celebrate the year passed and mark the beginning of 1990.

== United Kingdom ==
=== Life Peers ===
- Admiral Sir John David Elliott Fieldhouse, GCB, GBE, former Chief of Defence Staff.
- Daphne Margaret Sybil Desiree Park, CMG, OBE, lately Principal, Somerville College, Oxford.
- Sir Francis Leonard Tombs, Chairman, T and N and Rolls-Royce; Chairman, ACOST.

=== Privy Counsellors ===
- Sir Nicholas Walter Lyell, QC, MP, Solicitor General; Member of Parliament, Mid-Bedfordshire.
- John Haggitt Charles Patten, MP, Minister of State, Home Office; Member of Parliament, Oxford West and Abingdon.
- The Honourable William Arthur Waldegrave, MP, Minister of State, Foreign and Commonwealth Office; Member of Parliament, Bristol West.

=== Knights Bachelor ===
- Michael Richardson Angus, Chairman, Unilever plc.
- Professor Eric Albert Ash, CBE, Rector, Imperial College of Science, Technology and Medicine, University of London.
- Alexander Paul Beresford. For political and public service.
- David Berriman, Chairman, North East Thames Regional Health Authority.
- Charles Edward Bainbridge Brett, CBE. For Public Service in Northern Ireland.
- Trevor Edwin Chinn, CVO, Vice-Chairman, Wishing Well Appeal, Great Ormond Street Hospital for Sick Children.
- Harold Godfrey Oscar de Ville, CBE, Chairman, Meyer International plc.
- Robert William Simpson Easton, CBE, Chairman and Managing Director, Yarrow Shipbuilders Ltd.
- John Whitaker Fairclough, Chief Scientific Adviser, Cabinet Office.
- Alan Glyn, MP. For political service.
- Douglas Fleming Hardie, CBE, Deputy Chairman, Scottish Development Agency.
- Donald Frederick Norris Harrison, Professor of Laryngology and Otology, University of London.
- Professor James Clarke Holt, Lately Master of Fitzwilliam College and Professor of Medieval History, University of Cambridge, lately Vice-President, The British Academy.
- Derek Peter Hornby, Chairman, Rank Xerox (UK) Ltd. For services to Export.
- Charles Graham Irving, MP. For political service.
- Gordon Pearce Jones, Chairman, Yorkshire Water plc; Chairman Water Authorities Association.
- Frank William Lampl, Chairman, Bovis Construction.
- Eric Wallace McDowell, CBE, Chairman, Industrial Development Board for Northern Ireland.
- William David Morton, CBE. For political and public service.
- Vidiadhar (Vidia) Surajprasad Naipaul, Author.
- Major General Laurence Anthony Wallis New, CB, CBE. Lieutenant Governor of the Isle of Man.
- Christopher James Prout, QC, MEP. For political service.
- John Grand Quinton, Chairman, Barclays Bank plc.
- Raymond Mildmay Wilson Rickett, CBE, Director, Middlesex Polytechnic.
- John Wilson Smith, CBE, DL. For services to Sport.
- Colonel David Archibald Stirling, DSO, OBE. For services to the Military.
- John Anthony Swire, CBE, President, John Swire and Sons Ltd.
- Professor William Taylor, CBE, Vice-Chancellor, University of Hull; Chairman, Council for the Accreditation of Teacher Education.
- George Henry Turnbull, Chairman and Chief Executive, Inchcape plc.
- John Daniel Wheeler, MP, DL. For political service.

=== Order of the Bath ===
==== Knights Commander (KCB) ====
Military Division
Navy

- Vice-Admiral John Francis Coward, DSO

Army

- Lieutenant General Charles Ronald Llewelyn Guthrie, LVO, OBE (461440), Colonel Commandant Intelligence Corps.
- Lieutenant General Garry Dene Johnson, OBE, MC (448155), Colonel 10th Princess Mary's Own Gurkha Rifles.

Air Force

- Air Marshal Richard John Kemball, CBE, Royal Air Force.
- Air Marshal Michael James Douglas Stear, CBE, Royal Air Force.

Civil Division

- John Anson, CB, Second Permanent Secretary, H.M. Treasury.
- Clifford John Boulton, CB, Clerk of the House, House of Commons.
- Jack Hibbert, Director, Central Statistical Office.

==== Companions (CB) ====
Military Division
Navy

- Rear Admiral Peter George Valentin Dingemans, DSO
- Rear Admiral Guy Francis Liardet, CBE
- Rear Admiral Roger Oliver Morris.

Army

- Major General Leslie Francis Harry Busk (453447), Honorary Colonel Corps of Royal Engineers (Volunteers) Sponsored Units.
- Major General Michael Teape Fugard (455407), Army Legal Corps.
- Major General Robert John Hodges, OBE (451264), Colonel The King's Own Royal Border Regiment.
- Major General Jerrie Anthony Hulme (449197), late Royal Army Ordnance Corps.
- Major General Thomas David Graham Quayle (456514), late Royal Regiment of Artillery.

Air Force

- Air Vice-Marshal David Conway Grant Brook, CBE, Royal Air Force.
- The Venerable (Air Vice-Marshal) Brian Norman Halfpenny, QHC, Royal Air Force.
- Air Vice-Marshal Ronald Andrew Fellowes Wilson, AFC, Royal Air Force.

Civil Division

- Gillian Theresa Banks, Director, Office of Population Censuses and Surveys.
- Edward George Caldwell, Parliamentary Counsel, Office of the Parliamentary Counsel.
- Malcolm Clark, Inspector General, The Insolvency Service.
- John Ennis Coleman, Grade 3, Treasury Solicitor's Department.
- Philip Critchley, Director of Contracts, Highway Administration and Maintenance, Department for Transport.
- David Fell, Permanent Secretary, Department of Economic Development, Northern Ireland.
- Gwyn Jones Francis, Director General, Forestry Commission.
- Giles Hopkinson, Director, London Region, Property Services Agency, Department of the Environment.
- Thomas Pearson McLean, Director, Atomic Weapons Establishment, Ministry of Defence.
- George Gerald Newton, Directing Actuary, Government Actuary's Department.
- Peter Francis Owen, Deputy Secretary, Department of the Environment.
- Terence James Painter, Deputy Secretary, Board of Inland Revenue.
- Raymond Potter, Deputy Secretary, Lord Chancellor's Department.
- David Walter Ranson, OBE, Deputy Secretary, Ministry of Defence.
- William Wootton Scott, Grade 3, Industry Department for Scotland.
- James Moray Stewart, Deputy Secretary, Ministry of Defence.
- Donald Henry Twyford, lately Grade 3, Export Credits Guarantee Department.

=== Order of St Michael and St George ===
==== Companions (CMG) ====
- Morgan Alistair Boyd, Director of Operations for East, Central and Southern Africa, Commonwealth Development Corporation.
- Frederick Albert Neal, Grade 5, United Kingdom Representative, Council of the International Civil Aviation Organisation.

=== Royal Victorian Order ===
==== Knights Commander (KCVO) ====
- The Honourable Sir John Francis Harcourt Baring, CVO
- Colonel Robert Andrew Scarth Macrae, MBE
- George Douglas Pinker, CVO
- Kenneth Bertram Adam Scott, CMG

==== Commanders (CVO) ====
- George Charlton, CBE, QPM
- Alexander Clement Gilmour
- General Sir (Basil) Ian Spencer Gourlay, KCB, OBE, MC
- Major David Auldjo Jamieson, VC
- The Honourable Diana Mary Robina Makgill, LVO
- David Lars Manwaring Robertson

==== Lieutenants (LVO) ====
- Anne Honor Mary Beckwith-Smith
- Major Richard Julian Gretsy, MVO, MBE
- Commander Peter John Hughes, Royal Navy
- Robert Donald Godfrey Macdonald
- Derrick Frank Mead
- John Crosbie Perlin
- Patrick John Holmes Sellors
- William Hamilton Summers, MVO
- The Very Reverend John David Treadgold

==== Members (MVO) ====
- Ronald George Bell
- Geoffrey Hamilton Button
- Phyllis Margaret Carswell
- William Roger Craster
- Audrey Jessie Dellow
- Laurence Leslie Fuller, RVM
- Paul Frederick Goddard
- Major Edwin Hunt
- Warrant Officer Brian Lea, BEM (D1923398), Royal Air Force
- Theresa Melinda Perfect
- David Andrew Senior, RVM
- Patricia Wallace

=== Royal Victorian Medal ===
==== Silver ====
- Chief Technician Andrew John Bashford, (H9099479), Royal Air Force
- James Cameron
- Superintendent Gordon John Frederick Cheesman, Automobile Association.
- Harold Frederick George Cooper
- Police Constable James Deane, Metropolitan Police.
- George Leslie Dibley
- Local Acting Chief Petty Officer Steward Graham Keith Easter (D147638A), Royal Navy
- Elizabeth Mary Hanslip
- Julie Christine Moyes
- Police Constable Michael John Robinson, Metropolitan Police.
- Chief Technician Laurence Tucker, (C429095I), Royal Air Force.
- Anthony Patrick Willis
- Local Acting Chief Petty Officer (Sonar) Peter David Royden Young, (DI26302J), Royal Navy.

=== Order of the British Empire ===
==== Knights Grand Cross (GBE) ====
Military Division
Army

- General Sir Richard Vincent, KCB, DSO (417555), Colonel Commandant Royal Regiment of Artillery, Honorary Colonel 100 (Yeomanry) Field Regiment, Royal Regiment of Artillery (Volunteers).

Civil Division

- The Right Honourable Sir Tasker Watkins, VC, PC, Deputy Chief Justice.

==== Dames Commander (DBE) ====
Civil Division

- Maggie Smith, CBE (Mrs Cross), Actress.
- Rachel Elizabeth Waterhouse, CBE. For services to Consumer Affairs.

==== Knights Commander (KBE) ====
Civil Division

- Sir James Arnold Stacey Cleminson, MC, DL, Chairman, British Overseas Trade Board.
- The Right Honourable David Martin Scott Steel, MP. For political and public service.

Diplomatic and Overseas List

- John William David Swan, J.P. For public services in Bermuda.

==== Commanders (CBE) ====
Military Division
Navy

- Captain David Hart-Dyke, L.V.O., Royal Navy.
- Captain Terence James Meadows, Royal Navy.
- Principal Nursing Officer Eileen Mary Northway, R.R.C., Q.H.N.O., Queen Alexandra's Royal Naval Nursing Service.
- Captain Patrick Barton Rowe, L.V.O., Royal Navy.

Army

- Brigadier Norman Charles Allen, O.B.E., A.D.C. (454098), Corps of Royal Military Police.
- Brigadier Giles Geoffrey Arnold (457095), late Royal Regiment of Artillery.
- Colonel Mark Guy Douglas-Withers (479213), late Royal Regiment of Artillery.
- Colonel Anthony De Camborne Lowther Leask, O.B.E. (473996), late Scots Guards.
- Brigadier David Llewellyn Lewis, O.B.E. (457205), late Royal Tank Regiment.
- Colonel Graham Ridland Owens (447362), late Corps of Royal Engineers.
- Brigadier Nicholas Herbert Thompson, A.D.C. (453561), late Corps of Royal Engineers.
- Brigadier Samuel Thomas Webber (463531), late Corps of Royal Electrical and Mechanical Engineers.

Air Force

- Air Commodore Gordon Macarthur Ferguson, Royal Air Force.
- Group Captain Roderick Harvey Goodall, A.F.C., Royal Air Force.
- Air Commodore Shirley Ann Jones, Women's Royal Air Force.
- Air Commodore Christopher Peter Lumb, O.B.E., Royal Air Force.
- Group Captain Brian Campbell McCandless, Royal Air Force.

Civil

- John Kevin Ashcroft, Chairman and Chief Executive, Coloroll Group plc.
- John Martin Bankier, lately Controller, North Fylde Central Office, Department of Social Security.
- Professor Laing Barden, Director, Newcastle-upon-Tyne Polytechnic.
- Colonel Robert Renny St. John Barkshire, T.D., D.L., Chairman, Territorial Auxiliary and Volunteer Reserve Association South East.
- Michael Bett, Managing Director, British Telecommunications UK.
- Edward Charles Arden Bott, Chief Medical Officer, Metropolitan Police.
- John MacInnes Boyd, Q.P.M., lately Chief Constable, Dumfries and Galloway Constabulary.
- Albert Richard Brannon, O.B.E., Inspector Grade I, H.M. Fire Service Inspectorate.
- Kelvin Arthur Bray, O.B.E., Managing Director, Ruston Gas Turbines Ltd, General Electric Company plc. For services to Export.
- Martin Richard Fletcher Butlin, lately Keeper, Historic British Collection, Tate Gallery.
- Antonia Susan Byatt. Author.
- John Andrew Caldecott, Lately Member, Board of Banking Supervision.
- Arthur McLure Campbell, lately Principal Clerk of Session and Justiciary, Scottish Office.
- Leslie Neville Chamberlain, Chief Executive, British Nuclear Fuels, plc.
- Stanley William Clarke. For political and public service.
- Trevor Clay, lately General Secretary, Royal College of Nursing.
- Professor Charles Brian Cox, Pro-Vice-Chancellor, John Edward Taylor Professor of English Literature, University of Manchester.
- Robert Gammie Crawford, Chairman, Highlands and Islands Airports Ltd.
- John James Daniel. For political and public service.
- Ben Davies, Chairman, Sea Fish Industry Authority.
- Eurfil Rhys Davies, Professor of Radiodiagnosis, University of Bristol. President, Royal College of Radiologists.
- Michael Peter Davies, Grade 5, Radiocommunications Division, Department of Trade and Industry.
- Stanley Richard Dennison, Chief Executive, English China Clays plc.
- John Desborough, O.B.E. For political service.
- John Richard Gray Drummond, Writer and Broadcaster. For services to Music and the Arts.
- Henry John Evans, Chief Executive and Clerk, North Yorkshire County Council.
- Dudley Henry Fisher. For services to industry.
- Rodney Arthur Fitch, Chairman, Fitch R. S. plc, Design Consultants.
- Michael John Gambon, Actor.
- John Eliot Gardiner. For services to Music.
- Gerald William Garside, lately Director, National Audit Office.
- David Godfrey. For services to the Pharmaceutical Industry.
- Howard James Gould, Director of Laboratory, Harpenden, Ministry of Agriculture, Fisheries and Food.
- Roy Aubrey Grantham, General Secretary, Apex Partnership.
- Peter Denham Griffiths, Professor of Biochemical Medicine, University of Dundee.
- Angus McFarlane McLeod Grossart, Chairman, Scottish Investment Trust plc.
- Geoffrey Noel Hague, O.B.E., Chairman, North West Industrial Development Board.
- Daniel Hannah, Chairman, Warrington District Health Authority.
- John Thackery Hanvey. For political service.
- Professor Bryan Desmond Harrison, Senior Scientist, Scottish Crop Research Institute.
- David Harrison, Vice-Chancellor, University of Exeter.
- Mary Charmian Hartnoll, Director of Social Work, Grampian Regional Council.
- Professor Raymond Hide, Chief Scientific Officer, Meteorological Office.
- Anthony Jacklin, OBE. For services to Golf.
- David George Jefferies, Deputy Chairman, Electricity Council.
- Robert Brian Johnson, Q.P.M., D.L., Chief Constable, Lancashire Constabulary.
- Denis Edward Thomas Stuart Keefe, Assistant Solicitor, HM Board of Customs and Excise.
- Juan Herbert Kelly. For services to shipping.
- Roger Taylor Kingdon, Chief Executive, Davy Corporation plc.
- Richard Ingram Lindsell, Chief Executive, ICI Chemicals and Polymers Ltd.
- John de Courcy Ling. For political service.
- Felicity Ann Emwhyla Lott, Opera singer.
- Professor James Ephraim Lovelock. For services to the study of the Science and Atmosphere.
- John Caldwell Macfarlane, Vice-President, United Kingdom, Cummins Engine Company Ltd.
- Denis Mack-Smith, For services to Italian Studies.
- Professor John Matthews, Director, Institute of Engineering Research, Agricultural and Food Research Council.
- Professor William Duff McHardy, lately Director, Revised English Bible project.
- Neil William David McIntosh, Chief Executive, Dumfries and Galloway Regional Council.
- Christopher Wighton Moncrieff, Chief Political Correspondent, The Press Association.
- Kenneth Duncan Morrison, Chairman and Managing Director, William Morrison Supermarkets plc.
- Commander Peter Humphrey Page, R.N. (Retd.), lately Chairman, Offshore Petroleum Industry Training Board.
- Thomas Joseph Palmer, Group Chief Executive, Legal and General Group plc.
- Raymond Arthur Parsons, Chairman, Bowthorpe Holdings plc.
- Douglas Medcalf Paulin, O.B.E., lately Chairman, Eastern Health and Social Services Board, Northern Ireland.
- Gordon Terry Pepper, Director and Senior Adviser, Midland Montagu.
- Laurence Edwin Peterken, General Manager, Greater Glasgow Health Board.
- John Robert Purvis. For political service.
- Edward John Rayner, lately Controller, Europe Division, The British Council.
- William Gilbey Reed, City Architect, Birmingham City Council.
- Peter Anning Revell-Smith, The Chief Commoner, Corporation of London.
- Brian Mansel Richards, Chairman, British Bio-technology Group plc.
- Professor Michael Rosen, President, College of Anaesthetists.
- Geoffrey Roger Sagar, Professor of Agricultural Botany and Vice Principal, University College of Wales.
- Norman Walter Shaw, lately President, Ulster Farmers' Union.
- Captain Peter Jack Shaw, R.N. (Retd.), General Secretary, British Group, Inter-Parliamentary Union.
- Robin John Sheepshanks, D.L., Chairman, Standing Conference of East Anglian Local Authorities.
- David Sackville Bruce Simpson, Chief Executive, Civil Service Catering Organisation.
- Joseph Smedley, Grade 5, Home Office.
- Brian Arthur Rymer Smith, Assistant Secretary, Family Practitioner Services, Department of Health.
- Michael Roland Steele-Bodger. For services to Rugby Union Football.
- David Rodney Sweetnam, Consultant Orthopaedic Surgeon, Middlesex and Royal National Orthopaedic Hospitals.
- James Edward Teasdale, Chairman, Northumberland National Park Committee.
- Neville Edward Thurgood. For political service.
- Professor Joseph Burney Trapp, Director, Warburg Institute, University of London.
- Alan Frank Turberfield, Staff Inspector, Schools, Department of Education and Science.
- Lloyd Ramsay Turnbull. For services to the community in Gwent.
- Alan George Turner, Chairman and Chief Executive, BPB Industries plc.
- Norman Arthur Ward-Jones, Chairman, The Gaming Board for Great Britain.
- Anthony Warington, lately Company Secretary, Rolls-Royce plc.
- Robert Strachan Watt, Chairman, Livingston New Town Development Corporation.
- Ursula Maryrose, Lady Westbury, Superintendent-in-Chief, St. John Ambulance Brigade.
- Lawrence Bernard Westland. Founder and Executive Director, Music for Youth.
- David Thomas White, Director of Social Work. The National Children's Home.
- David Reeve Williams. For political and public service.
- Anthony Evelyn Williamson, Managing Director, Hoover (UK) plc, Merthyr Tydfil, Mid-Glamorgan.
- Professor John Kenneth Wing, lately Director, Social Psychiatry Unit, Medical Research Council.
- Lewis Wolpert, Professor of Anatomy and Biology as Applied to Medicine, University College and Middlesex School of Medicine.
- Ralph Woolf, Chairman, Co-operative Development Agency.
- Mohammed Mustafa Zuberi, Deputy Director of Medical Services, Health and Safety Executive.

Diplomatic and Overseas List

- Ronald George Blacker Bridge, O.B.E, J.P., Secretary for Education and Manpower, Hong Kong.
- Geoffrey Kemp Caston. For services to university education in the South Pacific.
- John Walter Chambers, O.B.E., J.P., lately Secretary for Health and Welfare, Hong Kong.
- Michael Hart. For services to education in Luxembourg.
- Stanley Charles Hunt, lately Director of Finance and Development, Council of Europe Secretariat, Strasbourg.
- Dr. Clarence Eldridge James, J.P. For public services in Bermuda.
- Arthur Everard Butler Laurence, O.B.E., Honorary British Consul, Cali, Colombia.
- Li Kwan-ha, Q.P.M., C.P.M., Commissioner of Police, Hong Kong.
- Professor William Ian Mackay McIntyre. For services to veterinary research in The Gambia.
- Michael Warren Parkinson. For services to British commercial interests in Australia.
- Dr. Robert Thomas Taylor, British Council Representative, Greece.
- Professor David Todd, O.B.E., J.P. For services to medical education in Hong Kong.
- Christopher John Turner, O.B.E., Governor of Montserrat.

==== Officers (OBE) ====
Military Division
Navy

- Commander David Kenneth Allsopp, Royal Navy.
- Commander Harry Arthur Diver, Royal Navy.
- Commander Michael Harvey Farr, Royal Navy.
- Commander Anthony Leslie Horton, Royal Navy.
- Commander Timothy Jones, Royal Navy.
- Commander Walter Henry Maxwell, Royal Navy.
- Commander John Bruce McLellan, Royal Navy.
- Commander Anthony Chittenden Moore, Royal Navy.
- Commander William George Frederick Organ, Royal Navy.
- Commander Andrew Neville Topp, Royal Navy.
- Commander Robin Courtnay Whiteside, Royal Navy.

Army

- Lieutenant Colonel Nicholas John Bird (461373), Royal Regiment of Artillery.
- Lieutenant Colonel William Ronald Clarke, MBE. (496655), Grenadier Guards.
- Acting Lieutenant Colonel Geoffrey Coles (445191), Combined Cadet Force, Territorial Army.
- Lieutenant Colonel Gavin Neil Donaldson (485716), Royal Corps of Signals.
- Lieutenant Colonel Clive Bruce Fairweather (476506), The King's Own Scottish Borderers.
- Lieutenant Colonel Simon Fordham (473946), Welsh Guards.
- Lieutenant Colonel Richard Simon Fox (487489), The Queen's Own Hussars.
- Acting Lieutenant Colonel Ronald James Cunningham Glasgow (455519), Combined Cadet Force, Territorial Army.
- Lieutenant Colonel Jonathan Charles Gunnell (481781), The Royal Regiment of Fusiliers.
- Lieutenant Colonel Michael Thomas Patrick Mary Hyland (474837), Royal Regiment of Artillery.
- Lieutenant Colonel Thomas John Ludlam (482777), Corps of Royal Engineers.
- Lieutenant Colonel David John Martin (479295), Corps of Royal Engineers.
- Acting Colonel Derek McNamara (470484), Army Cadet Force, Territorial Army.
- Lieutenant Colonel Alistair George Graham Miller (474010), The Queen's Royal Irish Hussars.
- Lieutenant Colonel Thomas Edmund Nelson (498059), Royal Corps of Transport.
- Lieutenant Colonel Robert John Fenwick Owen (489923), Corps of Royal Engineers.
- Lieutenant Colonel Ian Mackay Strain (493377), Royal Army Medical Corps.
- Lieutenant Colonel Peter Julian Wagstaffe (479376), Royal Regiment of Artillery.

Air Force

- Wing Commander Harry Binns (4335134), Royal Air Force
- Wing Commander Roger William Clark (686716), Royal Air Force.
- Wing Commander Oliver David Liam Delany (8021006), Royal Air Force.
- Wing Commander (now Group Captain) Lloyd Anthony Doble (4233288), Royal Air Force.
- Wing Commander Kenneth Harrison (2437512), Royal Air Force Volunteer Reserve (Training).
- Wing Commander Michael David Mockford (4109633), Royal Air Force.
- Wing Commander Kenneth Sidney Rowe (4072801), Royal Auxiliary Air Force.
- Wing Commander Michael Lloyd Simpkin (4335718), Royal Air Force.
- Wing Commander Ronald Charles Tong, MBE. (4335040), Royal Air Force.
- Wing Commander Alasdair Cushny Eales-White (2557645), Royal Air Force.

Civil Division

- Joseph Bartholomew Abrams, lately Chairman, National Association of Community Relations Councils.
- James Gay Adamson, Managing Director and General Manager NCR Manufacturing Ltd., Dundee.
- John Vernon Addison, Editor, The Cumberland News.
- John Frederick Lewis Aldridge. For services to Occupational Medicine.
- William Nelson Alexander, Assistant Chief Executive, Dumfries and Galloway Regional Council.
- Major John Allfrey, Director, Research into Ageing.
- Geoffrey Harry Langdon Andrew, Chairman, Colloids Ltd.
- The Right Reverend Monsignore Richard Atherton, lately Principal Roman Catholic Chaplain, Prison Service, Home Office.
- Alan Charles Frederick Aylesbury, Managing Director, Alcoe Manufacturing (GB) Ltd.
- John Christopher Neal Baillie, Principal, Newham Community College.
- Lady Evelyn Barbara Balfour, lately President, The Soil Association.
- Shirley Galloway Ballantine, lately Vice-Chairman, Scotland, Women's Royal Voluntary Service.
- Betty May Barchard, Chief Nursing Officer, The Hospitals for Sick Children Special Health Authority.
- Jean Barker. For political and public service.
- Captain William David Johnstone Barker, lately Operations Manager, BP Shipping Ltd.
- Daniel John Barratt. For political and public service.
- Mary Rideal Beer, President and Chairman, Sussex Counties Branch, British Red Cross Society.
- Annie Elizabeth Benton. For services to 'All Children Together'.
- David Charles Mowat Beveridge, Chief Information Officer (B), Scottish Office.
- Alan Edgar Bingham, Technical Executive, Vosper Thorneycroft (UK) Ltd.
- Robert Binks, Director, Chapeltown and Harehills Enterprise Ltd.
- Professor James Derek Birchall, Senior Research Associate, Imperial Chemical Industries plc.
- Walter Ernest Edgar Boreham, Deputy Assistant Commissioner, Metropolitan Police.
- William John Whitwell Bourne, Secretary, Institution of Mining Engineers.
- Royston Stephen Bowles, Managing Director, Roy Bowles Transport Ltd.
- John James Edward Brennan. For political service.
- Alison Claire Britton. For services to Pottery.
- Edward Samuel Broadway, Member and Vice-Chairman, East Anglian Regional Health Authority.
- Michael Edward Brown, Chief Executive, London Metal Exchange.
- Michael Godfrey Brown. For Public Service in Northern Ireland.
- Royston Brown, Chairman, Library and Information Services Council.
- Ronald William Brunskill, lately Reader in Architecture, University of Manchester. For services to conservation.
- Anthony Joseph Buckle, Headteacher, Hartridge High School, Newport, Gwent.
- George Anthony Bull, Writer, translator and consultant.
- Gordon Burnison, Director, Federation of Building and Civil Engineering Contractors, Northern Ireland Ltd.
- Einar Bursell, lately Research Fellow, Tsetse Research Laboratory, University of Bristol.
- Finlay Calder. For services to Rugby Union Football.
- Michael Vince Casey. For services to the railway industry.
- Ann Louise Chegwidden, Film Editor. For services to the British Academy of Films and Television Arts.
- David Findlay Clark, Director, Area Clinical Psychology Services, Grampian Health Board.
- Major John Frank Edward Clarke (Retd.). For services to the blind.
- Edward Eric Cleaver. For services to the community in Durham.
- Sebastian Newbold Coe, MBE. For services to Sport.
- Lieutenant Colonel John Kendal Plunket Coghill, (Retd.), Grade 6, Ministry of Defence.
- Lieutenant Colonel Nathan Leslie Cohen, TD. For services to the community in Cleveland.
- Tony Francis Collinson, lately Housing Services Adviser, Department of the Environment.
- Samuel Crilly, Chairman, Chancellor of the Duchy of Lancaster's Advisory Committee.
- Ernest Ambrose Crowe, Leader, Reigate and Banstead Borough Council.
- Joyce Elizabeth Ditchfield, lately Inspector of Taxes (P), Board of Inland Revenue.
- Keith Dixon, Commercial Director, Headquarters, British Aerospace (Dynamics) plc.
- Major Edward Robert Donnley (Retd.), MBE. For services to Greater Manchester and Stockport Division, Soldiers' Sailors' and Airmen's Families Association.
- Professor Geoffrey James Dowrick, lately Assistant Director, Plymouth Polytechnic.
- Garth Michael Weston Drabble, County Surveyor and Engineer, Cleveland County Council.
- Iain Donaldson Duffin, Managing Director, Microelectronics Ltd., Glenrothes.
- John Frederick East, lately Principal Adviser, Addictions, Hampshire County Council Social Services Department.
- Peter William Edmondson, Inspector of Taxes (SP), Board of Inland Revenue.
- Margaret Ellen English. For services to the community in Norfolk.
- Eldred Ann Oliver Evans, Senior Partner, Evans and Shalev. For services to architecture.
- Frank Evans, Chairman, Home Farm Trust.
- Frederick Redvers Evans, Life President, Evans of Leeds plc.
- Roger Ewbank, Director, Universities Federation for Animal Welfare.
- Professor John Maries Eynon. For services to Architecture in Wales.
- John Herbert Fathers, lately Director, Estates Management, University of Birmingham.
- Ian Hamilton Fazey, Northern Correspondent, The Financial Times.
- Maurice Frederick Fenn, Chief District Nursing Officer, Huntingdon Health Authority.
- Mark Ferguson, Appeal Chairman, Hampshire Wishing Well Appeal, Great Ormond Street Hospital for Sick Children.
- George Donald Finlayson, Convener, Ross and Cromarty District Council.
- Michael John Frost, Inspector of Taxes (SP), Board of Inland Revenue.
- Robin Frederick George Gardner, Regional Energy Efficiency Officer, North West Region, Department of Energy.
- Robert William Giles, Chairman, A. E. Farr and Company.
- Alexander Francis Gilmour, Principal Scientific Officer, Ministry of Defence.
- John Lawrence Glazier, Principal, South East Essex Sixth Form College.
- Neil Walter Graesser. For services to Salmon Fisheries Management.
- Professor James Robertson Gray, Professor of Actuarial Mathematics & Statistics, Heriot-Watt University. For services to Actuarial Education.
- Lieutenant Commander Dairmid Gunn R.N. (Retd.) Co-ordinator, Scottish Committee, British Food and Fanning.
- Barbara Hambly. For services to Hockey.
- Daphne Vera Hamilton-Fairley, Principal, Fairley House School for the Dyslexic, London.
- Norman Eric Hand, Director of Management Services, Metropolitan Police.
- David Charles Harding, Chief Executive (Europe), BP Exploration Company pic.
- Eric George Harding, lately Chief Conservator, British Museum.
- James Barrington Geen Harding. For political service.
- Donald Garvin Harris, Visiting Professor, University of Stirling.
- Kenneth Hayton, Chief Fire Officer, Clwyd Fire Service.
- Vincent Francis (Frank) Heaney, lately Regional Manager, Northern Ireland Carriers Ltd.
- John Stuart Heeks, Director, Defence Systems, STC Technology Ltd.
- Merryn Sinclair Henderson, Chief Area Nursing Officer, Shetland Health Board.
- Frank Chilton Hill, Grade 7, Eastern Traffic Area, Nottingham, Department of Transport.
- Alan Holt, Grade 6, The Patent Office.
- Richard Hope, Railway Journalist. Publisher, Railway Gazette International.
- James William Nicholson Hoseason, Chairman, Hoseasons Holidays Ltd.
- Greta Houghton. For political service.
- William Cullingford House, Assistant Director of Research, Imperial Cancer Research Fund.
- John Houston, Artist, painter.
- John Francis Houston. For political service.
- Peter Frederick Howgate, lately Grade 7, Ministry of Agriculture, Fisheries and Food.
- Ashley Clarence Hughes, Assistant Controller, North West Region, Department of Social Security.
- Wing Commander Frederick William Hulme, RAFVR (T) (Retd.). For services to the Air Training Corps.
- Alasdair Henry Hutton, MBE TD. For political service.
- Clive Ingram, lately Deputy Managing Director, Industrial Engineering Division, Press Construction.
- Alistair John Carmichael Johnston, Managing Director, The Gates Rubber Company Ltd, Dumfries.
- Elisabeth Audrey Jones. For political and public service.
- Trefor Glyn Jones, Chief Executive, Pilkington Optronics, St Asaph.
- Brian Ernest Herbert Joy, Jurat and Lieutenant Bailiff, Guernsey.
- Barbara Joan Kahan, Chairman, National Children's Bureau.
- John Edward Kane, Principal, West London Institute of Higher Education.
- Francis Kelly, Headmaster, Bishop Henshaw School, Rochdale.
- Alan Kilkenny, Chairman, Publicity Group, Wishing Well Appeal, Great Ormond Street Hospital for Sick Children.
- Anne Kind, lately Public Liaison Organiser, Leicestershire Organisation for the Relief of Suffering.
- David Kirkpatrick, Principal Professional and Technology Officer, Ministry of Defence.
- John Arthur Lanchbery, Conductor. For services to Music.
- John Francis Lavery, Managing Director, Guinness Northern Ireland Ltd.
- Dennis Lightfoot, lately Manager, Multi-Launch Rocket System, Birtley, Royal Ordnance plc.
- Geoffrey Ralph Livesey, Group Managing Director, Cobble Blackburn Ltd.
- Awni Michael Lutfy, Pathologist, Dumfries and Galloway Health Board.
- Roy Lynk, National President, Union of Democratic Mineworkers.
- David Mawson, DL, Founder and Chairman, British Association of Friends of Museums.
- John Charles Maynard, Divisional Chief Executive, Amersham International.
- Thomas McCafferty, Chief Executive, Fraser Williams Group Ltd.
- John McCarthy, Founder and Choral Director, The Ambrosian Opera Chorus and the John McCarthy Singers.
- Desmond McCourt, lately Chairman, Northern Ireland Historic Monuments Council.
- Duncan James McKichan. For services to Law.
- William David Shanks McLay, Chief Medical Officer, Strathclyde Police.
- Martin Wilkinson McNicol, Vice-Chairman, Parkside Health Authority.
- George Kenneth Medlock, DL, Chairman, Inward Ltd.
- David Austin Melford, Materials Research Consultant; lately Director of Research and Deputy General Manager, TI Research Laboratories.
- Alastair Milne, lately H.M. Inspector of Schools, Scottish Office.
- William Minto, Chairman, Sellafield Local Liaison Committee; Leader, Cumbria County Council.
- Reginald Mitchell, lately Grade 7, Department of Employment.
- Samuel Moore, Chairman and Managing Director, Moore Unidrill Ltd.
- Richard Mark Newby. For political service.
- Francis Denzil Newton, Senior Partner, Carter Jonas, Chartered Surveyors.
- (Angela) Jane (Udale) Nicholas. For services to Dance.
- Robert Nimmo, Rector, High School of Dundee.
- Thomas Nolan, Chief Executive, South Eastern, Education and Library Board, Northern Ireland.
- Brian Ward Page, Director, Foreign Language Teaching Unit, University of Leeds.
- Derrick Hughes Parry, Controller of Lands and Deputy Chief Executive, Land Authority for Wales.
- Richard William Patrick, Managing Director, Blankney Estates Ltd.
- Stanley Thomas Peacock, Managing Director, Burberrys Ltd.
- Hazel Pearson. For political and public service.
- Professor Peter Seward Pell, lately Head of Department of Civil Engineering, University of Nottingham.
- Susan Elizabeth Manthorp Pembrey, Director, Institute of Nursing, Oxford District, Clinical Practice Development Nurse.
- Patricia Anne Perkins. For political and public service.
- John Edward Perry, Grade 6, Office of Fair Trading.
- Roger Michael Thomas Phayre, Grade 7, Advisory Conciliation and Arbitration Service.
- Michael Stuart Philip, MBE. For services to Forestry.
- William Duncan Pinkney. For services to the community in North Humberside.
- John Platt, Chairman, Cheshire Agricultural Society.
- James William Porter, Director, Michelin Tyre plc.
- James Harkness Rae, Director of Planning, Glasgow District Council.
- Alfred Joseph Bragington Ratcliffe. For services to Agriculture in Wales.
- Annette Barbara Rawson, Senior Medical Officer, Department of Health.
- Frederick Thomas Rees, Director, Rank Hovis Ltd.
- Roger Coltman Rees, Chief Executive, Salford Metropolitan Borough Council.
- Colin David Reid, lately Principal Scientific Officer, Ministry of Defence.
- William Keith Robinson, Chairman, Charles Sykes Trust. For charitable services and services to the community in Harrogate, North Yorkshire.
- Bryan Robson. For services to Association Football.
- William Michael Robson, Commercial Director, Strip Mill Products, British Steel plc.
- Wyndham Julian Rogers-Coltman. For political and public service.
- Major Arthur Rose (Retd.), Chief Executive, Monks Ferry Training Workshop, Birkenhead.
- Michael Edward Rose, County Inspector of Music and Head, Bedfordshire County Music Service.
- Molly Daphne Rose, DL. For services to the community in Oxford.
- Anita Samuels, DL., Vice-Chairman, Liverpool Health Authority.
- John Richard Sandbrook, Executive Director, International Institute for Environment and Development.
- William Alexander Sands, lately Grade 6, Overseas Development Administration.
- Sidney Peter Sayer. For services to the Catering Industry.
- John Thornton Secker, Director, Wastesaver Board, OXFAM.
- Michael John Simpson, Manager, Reproduction Division, Ordnance Survey.
- Peter John Simpson, Deputy Chief Constable, Essex Police.
- Alexander Sinclair, DL. For services to Scottish Amateur Golf.
- Elizabeth Janet Smith, Chairman, Education Committee, Dumfries and Galloway Regional Council.
- Alexander Steele Soutar, Director of Personnel, Royal Dockyard, Rosyth.
- Patricia Ann Steel, Secretary, Institution of Highways and Transportation.
- Valerie Jean Steele, Principal, Department of Education, Northern Ireland.
- John Hubert Hall Stewart, General Medical Practitioner, Randalstown.
- Anita Straker, Inspector for Mathematics, Inner London Education Authority; Senior Adviser for In-service Training.
- Catherine Mary Stretton, Director Association and District Nursing Officer, London Prince of Wales District, St. John Ambulance Brigade.
- Sydney Symmonds. For services to the community in Leeds.
- Roger John Tayler, Professor of Astronomy, University of Sussex.
- George Malcolm Thomson, Author.
- Rex Francis Thorne, Chairman, Radio-Paging Association.
- Ronald John Thurlow. For political service.
- Anthony Simon Thwaite, Poet.
- Frederick Augustus Tuckman. For political service.
- James Robert Tunley, Director of Finance and Business Services, University of Aston.
- Martin Morris Weinberg. For services to mentally disabled people in Wales.
- Professor Gerald Westbury, Dean, Institute of Cancer Research; Consultant Surgeon, Royal Marsden Hospital.
- Arthur James White, Counselling Adviser, Liverpool, Small Firms Centre.
- Gordon Ewart Wickens, lately Chairman, National Council of YMCAs.
- Robert Purdy Wilkinson, Director of Surveillance, International Stock Exchange of the U.K. and the Republic of Ireland Ltd.
- Peter Wood, Development Manager, Mersey Barrage Company Ltd.
- James Barr Wright. For service to Edinburgh and Training in Scotland.

==== Members (MBE) ====
Military Division
Navy

- Captain (SCC) Peter Frederick Ansell, Royal Marine Reserve.
- Lieutenant Michael Peter Bullock, Royal Navy.
- Lieutenant Commander Kevin Robert Doney, Royal Navy.
- Lieutenant Commander David Anthony Gooding, Royal Navy.
- Lieutenant Commander Eric Woodhall Greetham, Royal Navy.
- Lieutenant Commander Malcolm Llewellyn-Jones, Royal Navy.
- Lieutenant William McEwan Meir, Royal Navy.
- Warrant Officer James Moulson.
- Lieutenant John Arthur Nundy, Royal Navy.
- Warrant Officer Ronald Riddell.
- Warrant Officer Kenneth George Sadler.
- Lieutenant Commander (SCC) William Jeffrey Shakespeare, Royal Naval Reserve.
- Lieutenant Commander Robert William Street, Royal Navy.
- Lieutenant Commander James Hamilton Simon Yorke, Royal Navy.

Army

- Major Kevin Thomas Bacon (503747), Corps of Royal Military Police.
- Major Henry Noel Benson (493974), The Royal Irish Rangers (27th (Inniskilling) 83rd and 87th).
- Major (Queen's Gurkha Officer) Chintabahadur Gurung, M.V.O. (504262), 6th Queen Elizabeth's Own Gurkha Rifles.
- HK/18263864 Warrant Officer Class 1 Michael Choi, Hong Kong Military Service Corps.
- Major Jerome Wilfrid Church (485691), The Royal Regiment of Fusiliers.
- LS 23682249 Warrant Officer Class 1 Peter Corbett, Royal Tank Regiment.
- 24116605 Warrant Officer Class 1 Terence John Crocker, Royal Army Pay Corps.
- Major Gwyn Gareth Davies (489179), The Parachute Regiment.
- Major Patrick Charles Deane (504665), Royal Regiment of Artillery.
- 24213097 Warrant Officer Class 1 Peter John Doherty, Royal Corps of Signals.
- 22779334 Warrant Officer Class 2 Anthony Gerald Doyle, The King's Regiment, Territorial Army.
- Captain Peter Thomas Dunkerley (519271), Grenadier Guards.
- 24064871 Warrant Officer Class 2 Steven Eggett, Intelligence Corps.
- Major William John Laverick Fiskel (482953), Royal Corps of Signals.
- Major David Barry Folwell (502071), Corps of Royal Engineers.
- Major Raymond Frederick Gatward (508926), Corps of Royal Electrical and Mechanical Engineers.
- Major Derek Corscaden Gent (515004), Royal Regiment of Artillery.
- Acting Captain John Henry Hargreaves (461131), Combined Cadet Force, Territorial Army.
- Major Robert Frederick Harmes (512099), Royal Regiment of Artillery.
- 24218742 Warrant Officer Class 2 Andrew Hill, Corps of Royal Engineers.
- 24105891 Warrant Officer Class 1 Robert Charles Hunt, Royal Corps of Signals, Territorial Army.
- Major Nigel Christopher Jackson (495185), Royal Corps of Signals.
- Captain Glyn Jones (524629), Royal Regiment of Artillery.
- Major Wyndham Holmes Austen Knight (455043), The Royal Scots Dragoon Guards (Carabiniers and Greys).
- 24149171 Warrant Officer Class 1 Neil Christopher Mapp, Royal Corps of Signals.
- Major William Eric Matthews (499119), Irish Guards.
- Major John William McNally (507752), The Black Watch (Royal Highland Regiment).
- Captain Peter James Mullings (520948), The Duke of Edinburgh's Royal Regiment (Berkshire and Wiltshire).
- Major Alan John Muston (437128), Royal Army Ordnance Corps.
- Major Anne Neo Notley (479826), Women's Royal Army Corps, Territorial Army.
- Major James Patrick Joseph O'Sullivan (491717), Corps of Royal Engineers.
- Lieutenant Philippa Ann Owens (526874), Women's Royal Army Corps.
- 24116656 Warrant Officer Class 2 John William Pepino, Intelligence Corps.
- 24010770 Warrant Officer Class 1 Thomas Edward Pickering, The Cheshire Regiment.
- Major Timothy John Van Rees (464861), The Royal Regiment of Wales (24th/4lst Foot), Territorial Army.
- Major Howard Addison Robinson (480387), The Prince of Wales's Own Regiment of Yorkshire.
- The Reverend Michael David Scouler (530493), Chaplain to the Forces 4th Class, Royal Army Chaplains' Department.
- 24445400 Warrant Officer Class 2 Adrian Terence Smith, The Queen's Regiment, Territorial Army.
- Major Michael Francis Thompson (467245), Corps of Royal Engineers.
- 24137629 Warrant Officer Class 2 Bernard William Virgin, Corps of Royal Military Police.
- Major Geoffrey Ernest Ward (488295), Corps of Royal Engineers.
- Captain Colin Richard White (521396), Royal Army Ordnance Corps.
- 24126011 Warrant Officer Class 1 John Phillip Wood, Corps of Royal Electrical and Mechanical Engineers
- Major Maldwyn Stephen Henry Worsley-Tonks (501706), The Parachute Regiment.
- Major Colin Young (505142), Army Catering Corps.

Air Force

- Squadron Leader Colin Richard Bolt (608815), Royal Air Force.
- Squadron Leader Kenneth Barrington Chalkley (608508), Royal Air Force.
- Flight Lieutenant Brian Verinder Chapman (4105696), Royal Air Force Volunteer Reserve (Training).
- Warrant Officer Francis Noel Cork (S4099555), Royal Air Force.
- Squadron Leader James Dalrymple Cunningham (687875), Royal Air Force.
- Warrant Officer Laurence Devlin (Q4044210), Royal Air Force.
- Squadron Leader Peter John Baker Elliott (685220), Royal Air Force.
- Squadron Leader David Ronald Gasson (5200733), Royal Air Force.
- Squadron Leader William Gault (4232943), Royal Air Force.
- Squadron Leader Timothy Alers Hankey (4231341), Royal Auxiliary Air Force.
- Warrant Officer Roy House B.E.M. (J4114864), Royal Air Force.
- Warrant Officer Neil Douglas Henry Hull (V0582714), Royal Air Force.
- Flight Lieutenant Ray Russell Innes (8000670), Royal Air Force.
- Squadron Leader Colin David Joyner (689364), Royal Air Force.
- Flight Lieutenant Malcolm Keith Lee (4282266), Royal Air Force.
- Flight Lieutenant Martin Lomas (5205252), Royal Air Force.
- Squadron Leader Montague Ian Martin (2771265), Royal Air Force.
- Master Aircrew Arunasalam Muniandy (F4266844), Royal Air Force.
- Squadron Leader Peter William Phillips Parry (4335889), Royal Air Force Regiment.
- Warrant Officer Brian Priestley (B4152593), Royal Air Force.
- Warrant Officer Alexander Rennie, B.E.M. (U0683527), Royal Air Force.
- Squadron Leader Owen Michael Rose (584770), Royal Air Force.
- Warrant Officer Douglas George Strudwick (14165873), Royal Air Force Regiment.
- Squadron Leader Ian Andrew Byham Wilson (8020781), Royal Air Force.
- Squadron Leader John Howard Wolley (3507434), Royal Air Force.

Civil Division

- James Porteous Abbott, President, Scottish Amateur Brass Band Association.
- Adam Henry Adam, Export Marketing Consultant and Enterprise Counsellor. For services to Export.
- Maureen Winifred Alexander-Sinclair, Deputy Director, Anti-Slavery Society for the protection of Human Rights.
- Alister Millar Allan. For services to Shooting.
- Alexander Anderson, Co-ordinator, Dumfries and Galloway, RAYNET.
- Austen Johnston Anderson, Chief Superintendent, Royal Ulster Constabulary.
- Dennis Andrews, Senior Divisional Officer, Kent Fire Brigade.
- Sylvia Ayton, Senior Designer, Wallis Fashion Group.
- Martha Bannigan, Headteacher, Alexandra Parade Primary School, Glasgow.
- Eric Barber, Chairman, General Council, Election and Enrolment Committee and Journal Advertising and Marketing Committee, Institute of Plumbing.
- Roseanne Valerie Lillian Barnett, Founder, 'Headway', Reading, Berkshire.
- Kenneth John Barrett, Higher Professional and Technology Officer, Medical Research Council.
- Michael George Barrett, Senior Consultant, Posford Duvivier (Consulting Engineers).
- Kenneth John Beard, lately Senior Executive Officer, South Western Electricity Board.
- David Harold Beattie, Grade 7, Deputy Officer, United Kingdom Telescopes, Hawaii.
- Eric Kirkland Beatty, Director, Northern Ireland Technology Centre.
- Adrian Simon Beers, Chairman, English Chamber Orchestra and Music Society.
- Henry Edward Vivian Bennett, Chairman, West Sussex War Pensions Committee.
- Ian Herbert Bensted, Planning Manager, Water, Thames Water Authority.
- Margaret Lucy Bexon, Director, Nottinghamshire Branch, British Red Cross Society.
- Carlo Alexander Biagi, lately Associate Specialist, Orthopaedic Surgery, Borders Health Board.
- Roger Edward Bibbings, Organiser and Coordinator, Health and Safety at Work, Trade Union Congress.
- Brian Bigley, Regional Director, Yorkshire and Humberside, Confederation of British Industry
- Diane Billups, Headteacher, Broughton Junior School, South Humberside.
- Reverend Anthony Leng Birbeck, Member, Farm Animal Welfare Council.
- Ronald George Birt, Chief Designer, Marshall of Cambridge (Engineering) Ltd.
- Joseph Anthony Bishop, Divisional Officer I, London Fire Brigade.
- Sheila Blaby. For political service.
- Betty Blomfield. For services to the community, London Borough of Hackney.
- Donald Thomas Bogie, Deputy Director, Environmental and Leisure Services, Annandale and Eskdale District Council.
- Harry Booth. For political service.
- Oliver Charles Bradley, Director of Nursing Services, North Cambridgeshire Hospital, Cambridge Health Authority.
- Christina Margaret Brandon, Chairman, Buckinghamshire Wishing Well Appeal, Great Ormond Street Hospital for Sick Children.
- Roderick George Braybrooke. For political service.
- James Henry Bridges, Observer Lieutenant, No. 1 Group Maidstone, Royal Observer Corps.
- Ronald Brierley, Senior Executive Officer, Department of Social Security.
- Reginald Gwyn Brooks, Managing Director, Osprey Metals Ltd.
- Isabella Rose Brough, Senior Executive Officer, Ministry of Defence.
- Franklyn "Frank" Roy Bruno. For services to Boxing.
- Christian Philips Buchan, Personal Secretary, Department of Social Security.
- Peter Ashley Thomas Insull Burman, General Secretary, Council for the Care of Churches.
- Ronald James Burton, Secretary, South Dorset Far East Prisoner of War Association.
- Alastair Buchanan Cameron, Director, Dumfriesshire Branch, British Red Cross Society.
- Malcolm James Campbell, lately City Business Librarian, Corporation of London.
- Peter Graham Campbell, General Manager, Monwel Hankinson Group, Gwent.
- Thomas Campbell, Chief Engineer, Citybus Ltd., Northern Ireland.
- Frank Firth Cantrill, lately Area Manager, Middle East, Mirrlees Blackstone (Stockport) Ltd. For services to Export.
- John Carr, Chairman John Carr Doncaster pic.
- Georgina Joyce Carter, Typist, Department of Social Security.
- Douglas Eric Chapman. For services to the community in Hornchurch, Essex.
- Marian Evelyn Chapman, Personal Secretary to Chairman, British Railways Board.
- Barkat Ali Chaudhry, Executive Officer, Department of Employment.
- Linford Christie. For services to Athletics.
- John Gordon Church, Inspector, Northamptonshire Police.
- Ruth Inge Karoline Clapham. For political and public service.
- Basil James Clarke, Home Service Electrical; Retail and Electrical Contractor.
- Pamela Clarke, lately Assistant Secretary, Faculty of Dental Surgery, Royal College of Surgeons.
- Harry Cleworth. For charitable services and services to the community in Manchester.
- Thomas Martin Clucas, Seeds Consultant, L. Teweles Seed Company, Europe.
- Brian Colston, Senior Partner, General Practice, Birmingham.
- Edward Conway, District Manager, Mersey District. North West Water Authority.
- John Henry Corfield. For services to the Streatham Youth Centre.
- Brian Hugh Cousin, Senior Executive Officer, Training Agency, Department of Employment.
- John Coutts, Secretary, Stewatry Branch, National Farmers' Union of Scotland.
- John Cowan, Scottish Director, The Open University.
- William Derrick Cowan, lately Area Accountant, Glasgow and Clyde Area, South of Scotland Electricity Board.
- Colin Robert Cowell, lately Chief Dental Officer, Unilever (UKCR) Ltd.
- Jean Margaret Craig. For political service.
- Wilma Mary Craigmile, lately Director of Nursing Services, Dundee Community Long Stay Unit, Tayside Health Board.
- Major Philip Leslie Crutchfield, (Retd.), Producer and Director, Colchester Searchlight Tattoo.
- Roy Cullingworth, Building Services Officer, University of Leeds.
- Mary Cunliffe, lately Typist, Department of Social Security.
- Ian Cunningham, lately Managing Director, Bournemouth Transport Ltd.
- Hugh Jonathan Mitchell Darby, Chairman, Nuclear Stock Association Ltd.
- Lloyd Hugh Davies. For services to the community in Plymouth, Devon.
- Mollie Patricia Davies, lately Head of Department of Dance Studies, Roehampton Institute of Higher Education.
- Trevor Hugh Davies. For services to Agriculture and the local community.
- Joyce Blair Deans, Principal, Blair Deans Practice.
- Philip Coleman Deeble, Member, Family Practitioners' Committee, Cornwall and Isles of Scilly.
- Mary Denniss, lately Deputy Headteacher, Highclifte County Junior School. For services to Music.
- Lillian Dent, Regional Emergency Services Organiser, Women's Royal Voluntary Service.
- Thomas David Dick, lately Co-ordinator, Rehabilitation Engineering Services, Lothian Health Board.
- James Arnold Dickinson, Senior Natural History Conservation Officer, North West Museum and Art Gallery Service.
- John Robert Francis Draper, Vice-President, Leicester Branch, The Royal Air Force Association.
- Elizabeth Macniven Dunn, Director, Ferguson and Rippin (Glasgow) Ltd.
- Thomas Peter John Dyke, lately Agricultural Director, British Sugar pic.
- Audrey Susan Elizabeth Ebbs, Hospital Manager & Supervisor of Midwives, The Princess Anne Hospital Southampton and South West Hampshire Health Authority.
- Frederick Barren Evans, Divisional Engineer, Motorways, Warwickshire County Council.
- Elsie Mary Eyles. For political service.
- Minette Finch-Knightley. For services to the Huntingdon and Peterborough Wishing Well Appeal, Great Ormond Street Hospital for Sick Children.
- Rosemary Katherine Findlay. For political and public service.
- Norman Edward Follis. For services to the Blind and the community in Wales.
- Michael Follows, Chief Superintendent, Lincolnshire Police.
- William Thomas Fowler, Senior Administrative Officer, Further Education, Sunderland.
- Dennis Fredjohn, Vice Chairman, 'Young Gloucestershire'.
- Reginald French, Divisional Officer, National Union of Public Employees; President, Trade Union Conference.
- Johir Denys Fuller, Senior Executive Officer, Home Office.
- Pamela Mary Gardner. For services to the community in Aldermaston, Berkshire.
- Mary Gibbon. For political service.
- Joyce Tulloch Gibbs, lately Chief Neurophysiological Measurement Technician, University Hospital of Wales, Cardiff.
- Fiona Mary Gillespie, Area Radiographer, Dumfries and Galloway Health Board.
- Professor Terence Gladman, Manager, Physical Metallurgy Department, Swindon Laboratories, British Steel pic.
- Squadron Leader Reginald Glew, R.A.F. (Retd.), Caseworker, Warwick Division, Soldiers', Sailors' & Airmen's Families Association.
- Betty Lydia Goodison, Secretary, St. James' Bushey (Open) Youth Club. President, Bushey Council of Youth.
- Harold John Goodyer, Appeals Secretary, Children's Family Trust.
- William Gordon, Business Liaison Manager, Aberdeen Journals Ltd.
- Robert Lawrence Keith Graham, Secretary, Black Isle Farmers' Society.
- Marjorie Gray, lately Secretary, Council for Voluntary Service, Macclesfield and District.
- Sheelagh Grew, Administrative Officer, Armagh Observatory.
- Esme Mary Grieve. For political service.
- Eunice Griffin, Sister-in-Charge, Milk Laboratory and Breast Milk Bank, North Manchester Health Authority.
- Jeanette Mavis Griffiths, lately Member, Rutland District Council.
- Greta Joan Grove, lately Director of Nursing Services, Community, Central Community Unit, Leicestershire Health Authority.
- Henry Alan Guest, Chairman, Rhodes Foods Ltd.
- Alexander Ewen Gunn, Airport Manager, Shoreham Airport, West Sussex.
- Thomas Herbert Hall, Secretary, The Society of Cable Television Engineers.
- William Frederick Hames, President, Society of Local Council Clerks.
- Barbara Agnes Hammond, lately Private Secretary to Chairman, British Gas plc.
- Pauline Hands, Senior Personal Secretary, Department of Health.
- Ellery Cuthwyn Hanley. For services to Rugby League Football.
- Stephen George Hardwick. For services to Sport for disabled people.
- Ronald Frank Hardy, Editor, Wetherby News, Yorkshire.
- Richard Malcolm Harker, Managing Director, Harkers Engineering Ltd. For services to Export.
- Lawrence Stuart Haveron, Regional Manager, British Steel Corporation (Industry) Ltd.
- Elisabeth Hawkins. For voluntary service to the National Trust.
- William Murray Higgins, International Marketing Director, Gullick Dobson Group.
- Sydney Vincent Hill, Chairman, Board of Governors, Bridley Moor High School, Redditch, Worcestershire.
- Arthur Edward Hiscocks, Senior Professional and Technology Officer, Regional Maintenance Support Unit, South West Region, Property Services Agency.
- Peter Hodgkiss, Manager and Chief Engineer of Seat Test Evaluation, Martin-Baker Aircraft Company Ltd.
- Margaret Mary Tina, Lady Howard. For services to the community in Bedfordshire.
- Sheila Joy Howe. For political service.
- Howel Matthew Howells, lately Executive Officer, Department of Employment.
- Geoffrey Colin Humphrey, Editor, Burnham and Highbridge Weekly News, South West Counties Newspapers Ltd.
- Leslie Thomas Hutchinson. For services to the communities of Woodbridge and Martlesham, Suffolk.
- Walter John Howard Ireland, Head of English and Language Faculty, Milford Haven School, Dyfed.
- Gerald Alfred Jackson, Manager, Electro-Magnetic Compatibility Department Era Technology Ltd.
- Harold Vincent Jackson. For political and public service.
- Barbara Wendy Johnson, lately Clerk Grade B, Humberside Unit, Army Cadet Force.
- William Martin Johnson, Deputy County Surveyor, Lancashire County Council.
- Carmel Emmanuel Jones, National Executive Director, New Assembly of Churches Rehabilitation Project. – Membership cancelled and annulled his name shall be erased from the Register of the said Order by order of the Queen, 15 October 2013
- Gwilym Jones, lately Clinical Instructor & Followup Co-ordinator, Spinal Injuries Unit, Robert Jones & Agnes Hunt Orthopaedic Hospital, Shropshire Health Authority.
- Grenfell Jones, Cartoonist, South Wales Echo.
- Iris May Jones, Senior Secretary, University of Sheffield.
- Thomas George Jones, Frontier Service Officer Grade 2, Ministry of Defence.
- Thomas Oliver Jones, Chief Superintendent, Metropolitan Police.
- Anne Elizabeth Kane, lately Nursing Officer, Coleraine Hospital, Northern Health and Social Services Board.
- Donald John Kean, lately Principal Assistant to the Chief Executive, Newcastle City Council.
- William Kennedy. For Public Service in Northern Ireland.
- Marguerite Cecelia Kenyon, Executive Director, Merseyside, Lancashire and Cheshire Council on Alcoholism.
- William Kerr, Managing Director, Hood Morton and Co. Ltd.
- Raymond King. For services to disabled people in Northern Ireland.
- George Bond Kinloch. Chief Engineer, MV ' Pole Star', Northern Lighthouse Board.
- Gabriel John Larroucau, Head of Engineering, Prestwick, British Aerospace (Commercial Aircraft) Ltd.
- Martine Le Moignan. For services to Squash.
- Robert Stanley Levene. For services to the Retired Executives Action Clearing House.
- Judith Lewis. For political service.
- Albert Robert Ley, B.E.M., Member, Disabled Person's Transport Advisory Committee.
- Reverend Kenneth Norman Loveless. For services to Morris Dancing.
- Kenneth Barry Lyndon, Clerk, The Royal College of Organists.
- Murdina MacDermid, President, Harris Disabled Group, Western Isles.
- Suzanne Helene, MacKenzie, Chairman, League of Friends, Hurstwood Park Hospital; Chairman, St. Catherine's Hospice Project.
- Kenneth Roy Maitland, lately Assistant Group Manager, Administration, North West Group, British Coal.
- Frederick Gordon Mapp, Higher Professional and Technology Officer, Ministry of Defence.
- Margaret Eileen Martin, Revenue Executive, Board of Inland Revenue.
- Stanley Hallam Martin, lately Chairman, National Westminster Staff Samaritan Fund.
- Sardul Singh Marwa, Manager, Handsworth Opportunities Programme for Employment.
- Sarah Edith Mawhinney. For services to the Citizens' Advice Bureau, Northern Ireland.
- Violet Joan May, Higher Executive Officer, Department of Trade and Industry.
- Richard Mayall. Farmer, Shrewsbury.
- Mollie McBride, Senior Partner, General Practice; Member, Cheshire Local Medical Committee.
- Sarah McColgan, Principal, Loughgall Primary School, County Armagh.
- Gerard McEvoy. For political service.
- Anthony McGann, Chairman, Eldonian Housing Co-operative and Eldonian Community Trust, Liverpool.
- Margaret Pamela McGaughrin, Member, Strathclyde Region, Children's Panel Advisory Committee.
- Rowan Warnock McGhie, Chairman, Farming and Wildlife Advisory Group, Northern Ireland.
- Angus McGill, Journalist, Evening Standard.
- Patrick John McGowan, Sub-Officer, Fire Authority for Northern Ireland.
- Ronald McGregor, Traffic Assistant, Caledonian MacBrayne Ltd.
- Isobel Marie McIlroy, Staff Officer, Department of Finance and Personnel, Northern Ireland.
- Joseph McKeever, Superintendent, Royal Ulster Constabulary.
- Rose Patricia McManus, Administrative Officer, Department of Education, Northern Ireland.
- Doreen Miller. For services to the advancement of women in Politics and Local Government.
- Barbara Mary Mills, County Organiser, Women's Royal Voluntary Service, Dorset.
- Robert Anthony Locke Mills, Inspector, West Mercia Constabulary.
- James Moorcroft, Deputy Leader, Chorley Borough Council.
- Jack Morgan, Laboratory Steward, River Laboratory, Natural Environment Research Council.
- William Herbert Morgan, lately Manager, Outfit Shops, Cammell Laird Shipbuilders Ltd.
- Daniel Moriarty, Inspector of Taxes, Board of Inland Revenue.
- Alexander McLaren Morton, Senior Agricultural Officer, Department of Agriculture, Fisheries and Food for Scotland.
- Derek Lynden Mosey, Editor, The Visitor, Morecambe.
- Percy George Moss, Chairman and Vice President, British Hang Gliding Association; For services to Air Safety.
- William Burness Murray, Senior Professional and Technology Officer, Ministry of Defence.
- Philip Digby Neal, General Secretary, National Association for Environmental Education.
- Harold Rhead Newton, Member, Epsom and Ewell Borough Council.
- Stanley William Nicholls, Senior Professional and Technology Officer, Department of Transport.
- William George Niven, Technical Director, Forbo Kingfisher Ltd.
- Enid Noble, lately Headteacher, Grangetown Primary School, Sunderland.
- Joyce Norrish, Deputy Director and Training Officer, Devon Branch, British Red Cross Society.
- Mary North, Voluntary Worker, Chesham Citizens' Advice Bureau.
- James Reginald Nottingham, Chairman, Bedfordshire War Pensions Committee.
- Reverend Derek Nuttall, Director, Cruse—Bereavement Care.
- Erica O'Donnell. For services to the Study Centre for the History of Fine and Decorative Arts.
- Dorothy Jean Oliver, College Secretary, University College, University of Durham.
- Peter Matthew O'Mahony, Social Worker, Lockerbie Area, Dumfries and Galloway Regional Council.
- Paul Oppenheimer, Regulations and Standards Manager, Lucas Automotive Ltd.
- Ivor George Oswald, Northern Ireland Regional Controller, Alliance and Leicester Building Society.
- Joyce Alice Padmore, lately President, Association of Pharmacy Technicians.
- Peter Frank Palmer, Chairman and Managing Director, Spider Systems Ltd, Edinburgh.
- Isabelle Parker. For services to Foster Care.
- Mary Parker, Local Officer I, Department of Social Security.
- Patrick Denis Parker, Senior Valuation Executive, Board of Inland Revenue.
- Olga Parkinson, Secretary, Greater Manchester Police.
- William Parr, Secretary, Dumfriesshire Branch, Search and Rescue Dogs' Association.
- Phyllis Pask. For services to the community in Leeds
- Donald Peacock, Typist, Department of Social Security.
- John Copson Peake. For political and public service.
- George Henry Peters, lately Revenue Executive, Board of Inland Revenue.
- Hamish Porter, Regional Collector of Taxes, Board of Inland Revenue.
- Leslie Porter, Instrument Workshop Superintendent, British Petroleum Chemicals Ltd.
- Clive Howard Potter, Manager, Cash and Credit Control, Jaguar Cars Ltd.
- Ethel Powell, Chairman and Secretary, The League of Friends, Chase Community Hospital, Cannock.
- Gladys Anna Powell, Senior Project Director, Project Trident.
- Jack Seymour Powell. For services to Mountain Rescue.
- Thomas Hugh Power, Projects Manager, Survival Equipment Research and Development Department, Wardle Storeys.
- Paul Francis Joseph Quick, Assistant Divisional Officer, London Fire Brigade.
- Lieutenant Thomas Henry Quilliam, R.N. (Retd.). For services to the Far Eastern Prisoners of War in Cornwall.
- Elizabeth St. Clare, Radford. For services to Canoeing.
- Percival Russell Read, lately Clerk, Grantham Almshouse Charities.
- Brian Reed, Chairman and Managing Director, Reed Print and Design.
- Cyril Rowland Rees. For services to Agriculture and the community.
- David Frederick Reid. For services to the Royal British Legion, Somerset.
- Morfudd Roberts, Director, Craftsman's Mark Ltd.
- Isabella MacMillan, Robertson, Nursing Officer, Surgical Care Area, Crawley Hospital, Mid- Downs Health Authority.
- Robert Macfarlane Robertson, Principal Teacher of Chemistry, Blairgowrie High School, Tayside Region.
- Beatrice Helen Rosbottom, Public Relations Officer, The War Widows' Association of Great Britain.
- Sarah Kathryn, Salvesen, Nurse Volunteer, " Across " Charity for the Disabled.
- Elizabeth Samuel. For services to Tourism in Wales.
- Iris Samuel. For charitable services to the City of London.
- Ivor George Sankey, Technical Director, Hardy Spicer Ltd.
- William Russell Scarfe, Chief Systems Development Engineer, British Aerospace (Military Aircraft) Ltd.
- Bryan Scott, Managing Director, Spartan Redheugh Ltd.
- Clara Scott, For services to the community in Cheshire.
- James Ewan Scott, Chief Naval Design Engineer, GEC Alsthom Turbine Generators Ltd.
- June Rose Sears, Personal Secretary to the Secretary, The Institute of Chartered Accountants of England and Wales.
- Neville Ivor Sedgley-Corner, Administrative Officer, Department of the Environment.
- George William John Alan Senior, Administrator, Dental Hospital, Leeds.
- Eileen Heather Severs, Prison Service Voluntary Worker, H.M. Prison Ashwell.
- William Brian Sharpe, Senior Executive Officer, H.M. Board of Customs and Excise.
- Anthony George Shaw, Head of Unit for Disabled Passengers, London Regional Transport.
- Mary Shaw. For political service.
- Raymond Henry William Sherwood, Professional Support Grade 2, Instrumentation and Applied Physics Division, Harwell Laboratory, UKAEA.
- Barbara Joyce Shute, Senior Nurse, Trauma Service, Torbay Health Authority.
- Jack Simmons. For services to Cricket.
- Robert Simpson, Probation Officer, Northumbria.
- Ashley Douglas Skinner, Manager, Standards and Calibration Department, Marconi Instruments Ltd.
- Colin Alfred Slipper, Chairman, Tyneside Leukaemia Research Association. For services to charity.
- Anne Sloan, Staff Officer, Board of Inland Revenue.
- Trevor Owen Smalley, Regional 'Inset' Coordinator, Greater Manchester Local Education Authorities.
- Joseph Patrick Smith, Secretary, Downpatrick and Area Inter-Church Action for Community Employment Project.
- Vivian Smith, Chairman, Good Shepherd Hospice, Chester.
- Betty Margaret Southgate, Higher Executive Officer, Department of Employment.
- Anne Spencer, Deputy General Secretary, National Union of Tailors and Garment Workers.
- Ronald Ernest Sturt. For services to the Talking Newspaper for the Blind.
- Rosetta Lilian Styles, lately Head Teacher, Torridon Infants School.
- Reverend Matthew Sullivan. For services to the community in Cumnock, Ayrshire.
- Ethel May Surman, Chairman, League of Friends, Kingston Hospital.
- Alan Sykes. For political and public service.
- Winifred May Sylvester. For services to Bath MENCAP Society.
- Roy Burls Tabor, Librarian, Wessex Regional Library and Information Service.
- George Ernest Teal. For services to the community in Walkington, East Yorkshire.
- Mary Parker Smith Thomas. For services to mentally disabled people in Staffordshire.
- Charles Arthur Thompson, Chairman, 1989 Co-ordinating Committee, Skill Olympics; Member, Council of Society for Promotion of Vocational Training and Education.
- Dorothy May Tilley, Chairman, Christchurch Hospital League of Friends.
- Shirly Lois Tomkinson, lately Senior Matron, The Civil Service Benevolent Fund.
- Marion Tracey. For political and public service
- Geoffrey Troop, lately Higher Executive Officer, Ministry of Defence.
- Peter Trueman, lately Chief Clerk, Ipswich County Court, Lord Chancellor's Department.
- Joyce Elizabeth Turner, Typist, Ministry of Agriculture, Fisheries and Food.
- John Wilfrid Tweddle. For political and public service.
- Margaret Anne Veater, Project Development Officer for Mentally Handicapped.
- Robert Ian Vickers, Chief Executive, Fryma Fabrics Ltd. For services to Export.
- Peter Anthony Wade, Chief Commandant, South Yorkshire Special Constabulary.
- Gerald Hamilton Walker, Brigade Secretary, The Boys' Brigade.
- Louis David Walker, Managing Director, McKey Food Services Ltd.
- William Hotchkis Richmond Waters, County Director, South and West Yorkshire Branch, St John Ambulance Brigade.
- Leonard Thurgood Watson, General Manager, Corporation of Lloyd's.
- Alan Webb, lately Chief Fire Officer, East Midlands International Airport.
- Sylvie Winifred Weir, Executive Officer, Department of Social Security.
- Joan Eileen Welch, Member, St. Albans Branch, Age Concern.
- John Kenneth Whitehead. For services to the Police and Prison Museum, Ripon.
- Robert Edmund Whittaker, lately Director, Staff Services, The Open University.
- William Wilkie, Chairman, Eildon Housing Association, Roxburghshire.
- Barbara Doris Willerton, Higher Executive Officer, Ministry of Defence.
- Winston Wilbert Williams. For services to community relations in Rugby.
- Eleanor Dorothy Wilson, Regional Catering Officer, Dumfries and Galloway Regional Council.
- John Fyfe Wilson, Managing Director, W D Wilson and Son (Bradford) Ltd.
- John Thomas Wilson. For services to local government and the community in the West Midlands.
- Derek George Wood, Higher Executive Officer, H.M. Board of Customs and Excise.
- Frank Douglas Wood, Chairman, Committee for the Employment of Disabled People.
- Hugh Wood. For services to the community, Auldhouse, Glasgow.
- Joselyn Enid Wood, Grade 7, Welsh Office.
- Dorothy Mabel Woodcock. For services to the community in Hewelsfield, Gloucestershire.
- Peter Alwyn Woods, lately Regional Personnel Manager, Scottish Region, British Railways.
- Joan Marion Wrightson, Member, East Yorkshire Health Authority; Part-time Practice Hull.
- Vanessa Rosamunde Wynn Griffiths, Director, Allied Medicare Nursing Services Ltd.
- Rosamond Inga Eleanora de Reventlow Wynn-Pope. For political and public service.
- Christopher James Yeates. For services to the community in Penrhys, Rhondda, Mid Glamorgan.
- Alexander James Young, Chief Superintendent, Central Scotland Police.
- Edward Alan Young. For political service.

=== Imperial Service Order ===
- John Neville Atkinson, Grade 6, Department of the Environment.
- Paul Wilson Brook, Grade 7, Foreign and Commonwealth Office.
- Robin Frederick Bruford, Inspector of Taxes (SP), Board of Inland Revenue.
- Arnold Clegg, Deputy Collector, HM Board of Customs and Excise.
- John Goddard, Senior Principal, Department of Health.
- Ronald Trevors Grundy, lately Grade 7, Department of Social Security.
- Edward Charles Haywood, Senior Principal, Ministry of Defence.
- Robert Kenneth Houghton, Grade 6, Department of the Environment.
- John Patrick Kennedy, Principal, HM Board of Customs and Excise.
- Iain Macivor, lately Chief Inspector of Ancient Monuments, Scottish Office.
- Dennis Edward Mahoney, lately Principal, Ministry of Defence.
- William Robert Matthews, Principal, Industrial Development Board, Northern Ireland.
- Ronald Harris McIlroy, lately Grade 7, Department of Employment.
- Michael John Murphy, lately Grade 7, Prison Service Headquarters, Home Office.
- Derek John Pepper, Inspector of Taxes (SP), Board of Inland Revenue.
- John Dewhurst Robson, Inspector of Taxes (P), Board of Inland Revenue.
- Jim Sharp, lately Grade 7, Department of Social Security.
- Ian Roy Stageman, Principal, Ministry of Defence.
- Harold Ernest Wainman, lately Principal Scientific Officer, Ministry of Agriculture, Fisheries and Food.
- Edward Richard Walter, Grade 7, Lord Chancellor's Department.
- Ifor Williams, Grade 7, Ministry of Agriculture, Fisheries and Food.

=== British Empire Medal ===
Military Division
Navy

- Chief Wren Writer Lee Kathleen Burgon, Women's Royal Naval Reserve, W952475P.
- Acting Petty Officer Air Engineering Artificer (M) Michael Gerard Dunne, D168094P.
- Chief Petty Officer Weapon Engineering Artificer Christopher John Edwards, D10780IN.
- Chief Petty Officer Physical Trainer David Evans-Turner, D08934IX.
- Acting Chief Wren Regulating Moira Ann Fisher, W128921L.
- Chief Petty Officer Aircrewman Richard John Foster, D099448B.
- Chief Air Engineering Mechanic (R) Jeffrey Norman Hards, Dl 15675U.
- Marine William John Hazlie, Royal Marines, P035843Q.
- Chief Petty Officer Air Engineering Artificer (WL) Graham John Howe, F983238A.
- Colour Sergeant John Edward Jackson, Royal Marines, P013385U.
- Petty Officer Marine Engineering Mechanic (M) Hamish Alexander Jones, D142003H.
- Chief Petty Officer Weapon Engineering Artificer Ronald Louis Le-Fur, D051541R.
- Charge Chief Weapon Engineering Artificer Kenneth Douglas Light, D070495W.
- Colour Sergeant Michael Edward McKenna, Royal Marine Reserve, P990857U.
- Petty Officer Writer Ian Michael Parks, D150194F.
- Chief Wren (Degaussing) Lesly Trodd, Women's Royal Naval Reserve, W990339K.
- Chief Petty Officer Weapon Engineering Artificer Winston Sam Wakefield, M95677IE.
- Chief Petty Officer (Operations) (Missile) John Edward Wallace, J661238V.
- Chief Petty Officer Marine Engineering Artificer (P) Anthony Thomas Willsher, D065768B
- Chief Petty Officer Weapon Engineering Artificer Douglas Lawrence Woolner, M905638H.

Army

- W0458191 Sergeant Rosemary Ann Amy, Women's Royal Army Corps.
- 24314111 Sergeant Norman Derek Ansell, Royal Corps of Transport.
- 22538288 Staff Sergeant Glen Ryder Ashton, The Devonshire and Dorset Regiment, Territorial Army.
- 21160738 Sergeant Balparsad Sherchan, 6th Queen Elizabeth's Own Gurkha Rifles.
- 23465800 Staff Sergeant Thomas Bell, The King's Regiment, Territorial Army.
- 23053488 Corporal Peter Ian Boyes, Army Catering Corps, Territorial Army.
- 24296006 Sergeant Clifford Frederick Branson, The Royal Green Jackets.
- 24423364 Sergeant Roger Calderwood, Royal Army Medical Corps.
- 24200760 Staff Sergeant Christopher Gordon Caton, Coldstream Guards.
- 24259071 Sergeant Stuart James Charlton, Royal Regiment of Artillery.
- 24122455 Sergeant Robert Charters, The King's Own Scottish Borderers.
- 24166578 Corporal Barry Allan Clarkson, Royal Corps of Transport.
- 24134684 Lance Corporal Nigel Thomas Cope, The Royal Regiment of Wales (24th/41st Foot).
- 24144102 Sergeant William Eric Crowder, The Royal Yeomanry, Territorial Army.
- LS 23972542 Staff Sergeant Brian Anthony Dacey, Royal Army Ordnance Corps.
- 24396586 Sergeant Malcolm John Deacon, Royal Army Ordnance Corps.
- 23530053 Sergeant Paul Kyle Dunn, Royal Army Pay Corps, Territorial Army.
- 23835927 Staff Sergeant George Henderson Fraser, Royal Corps of Signals, Territorial Army.
- 24070008 Sergeant David John Gatford, Royal Regiment of Artillery.
- 24112589 Staff Sergeant Robert Geddes, Corps of Royal Electrical and Mechanical Engineers.
- 24355156 Corporal Keith Goodlad, The Green Howards (Alexandra Princess of Wales's Own Yorkshire Regiment).
- 24248291 Corporal George Haffie, Royal Tank Regiment.
- 24217720 Sergeant Nigel John Hancock, Corps of Royal Electrical and Mechanical Engineers.
- 24185783 Staff Sergeant Nigel Alistair Hart, Royal Army Ordnance Corps.
- W0462855 Staff Sergeant Deborah Jane Hicks, Women's Royal Army Corps.
- 22201996 Staff Sergeant Joseph Hodgson, Royal Corps of Signals, Territorial Army.
- 22651215 Sergeant Stuart Marsden Holmes, Army Catering Corps, Territorial Army.
- 24279687 Staff Sergeant James Douglas Stewart Humphrey, The Royal Green Jackets.
- 24181753 Staff Sergeant Peter Raymond Hunt, Royal Regiment of Artillery.
- 24237244 Sergeant Charles Leslie Johnson, Royal Corps of Signals.
- 24410309 Corporal Thomas Johnston, The Royal Highland Fusiliers (Princess Margaret's Own Glasgow and Ayrshire Regiment).
- 22607498 Corporal John Aloysius Keen, Royal Army Medical Corps, Territorial Army.
- LS 23910590 Staff Sergeant John William Lawton, The Royal Anglian Regiment.
- 24144862 Corporal John William Leverett, Royal Corps of Transport.
- 24335255 Staff Sergeant Colin Keith Luckham, Royal Corps of Signals.
- W0418940 Private Susan Marcroft, Women's Royal Army Corps.
- 24223496 Staff Sergeant Terence McIntosh, Royal Corps of Transport, Territorial Army.
- 23534358 Staff Sergeant Joseph Barry Milburn, Royal Regiment of Artillery.
- 24209504 Sergeant John Hamilton Morgan, Corps of Royal Engineers.
- 24365115 Staff Sergeant Richard Graham Morgan, Corps of Royal Electrical and Mechanical Engineers.
- 24364162 Staff Sergeant Andrew Kenneth Mudd, Corps of Royal Military Police.
- 23662898 Sergeant Brian Frederick George Mulcock, The Royal Yeomanry, Territorial Army.
- 24119803 Sergeant Thomas Patrick Collins Murray, Royal Regiment of Artillery.
- 24468683 Sergeant Russell Nellies, The King's Regiment.
- LS 23663019 Staff Sergeant George Ash ton NIXSON, 13th/18th Royal Hussars (Queen Mary's Own).
- 24447777 Staff Sergeant Alan Osmand, Corps of Royal Electrical and Mechanical Engineers.
- 24328459 Corporal David Richard Pearson, Corps of Royal Engineers.
- 24367553 Staff Sergeant Jeffrey Richard Pedrick, Royal Army Veterinary Corps.
- 24509228 Staff Sergeant Peter Adam Pile, Corps of Royal Electrical and Mechanical Engineers.
- 24442890 Sergeant Robert Bruce Reid, Royal Corps of Signals.
- 24279583 Staff Sergeant Geoffrey Robert Robson, Royal Army Ordnance Corps.
- 24029452 Sergeant David John Rogers, Royal Regiment of Artillery.
- 24113412 Staff Sergeant Timothy John Scarll, Royal Army Pay Corps.
- 24019953 Staff Sergeant Eric Sidney Scholey, Corps of Royal Engineers.
- 21159671 Sergeant Shreebahadur Gurung, 2nd King Edward VII's Own Gurkha Rifles (The Sirmoor Rifles).
- 23914118 Staff Sergeant Derek Anthony Skelly, Corps of Royal Engineers, Territorial Army.
- 24231118 Corporal Mark Francis Smith, Royal Corps of Signals.
- HK/18264834 Sergeant To Yuen Sun, Queen's Gurkha Signals.
- 24024004 Staff Sergeant Thomas James Walker, The Queen's Royal Irish Hussars.
- 24210255 Corporal Steven Joseph Webb, The Parachute Regiment.
- 24306844 Sergeant Adrian Thomas Wedesch, Grenadier Guards.
- 24336357 Sergeant Nicholas Jan Wells, Corps of Royal Electrical and Mechanical Engineers.
- 24141029 Staff Sergeant Anthony James West, Grenadier Guards.
- 23478292 Staff Sergeant John Reginald Williams, Special Air Service Regiment, Territorial Army.
- 24247319 Staff Sergeant Terence William Young, Royal Army Pay Corps, Territorial Army.

Air Force

- J4288539 Flight Sergeant Christopher John Bilner, Royal Air Force.
- D8116371 Sergeant Harry Ross Boyes, Royal Air Force.
- A0594661 Flight Sergeant (now Warrant Officer) Ronald Bramley, Royal Air Force.
- T8090732 Flight Sergeant Alan Dobson, Royal Air Force Regiment.
- D4282869 Chief Technician Gregory William Dutton, Royal Air Force.
- B8103912 Flight Sergeant Shaun Thomas Ekberg, Royal Air Force.
- E1943536 Flight Sergeant (now Warrant Officer) Peter Charles Flintham, Royal Air Force.
- J4262136 Flight Sergeant Eric Dixon Forsyth, Royal Air Force.
- Q8069968 Flight Sergeant William John Graham, Royal Air Force Regiment.
- A8108018 Sergeant Alan John Lupton, Royal Air Force.
- G1936736 Flight Sergeant Robert Alfred McGarva, Royal Air Force.
- C1950417 Flight Sergeant (now Warrant Officer) Terence Arthur McNalty, Royal Air Force.
- H3524554 Flight Sergeant John McQueen, Royal Air Force
- Y4135131 Flight Sergeant Michael Marfleet, Royal Air Force.
- A0595587 Flight Sergeant (now Warrant Officer) Wynford Morgan, Royal Air Force.
- F2630459 Sergeant Leslie Alec John Parren, Royal Auxiliary Air Force Regiment.
- B8001199 Flight Sergeant Eric Salisbury, Royal Air Force.
- F8083546 Flight Sergeant Colin Smith, Royal Air Force.
- T8008884 Chief Technician Eric Robert Smith, Royal Air Force.
- N0589531 Flight Sergeant Terence Stiby, Royal Air Force.
- H8008036 Chief Technician David Charles Wilson, Royal Air Force.
- G8090859 Sergeant Bernard Lewis Woodward, Royal Air Force.

Civil Division

- Leon Joseph Ablett, lately Technical Officer, British Telecommunications pic.
- William David Aicken, Cleansing Supervisor, Castlereagh Borough Council.
- Zohra Naseem Akhtar. For services to the Asian Community in Hammersmith and Fulham.
- William Thomas Alberry. For services to the St. John Ambulance Brigade, Hatfield, Doncaster.
- David Gordon Allin, Senior Storekeeper, Ministry of Defence.
- John Anthony Allport, Q.G.M., Detective Sergeant, Metropolitan Police.
- Patricia Almond, Personnel and Training Manager, William Reed (Weaving).
- Arthur Norman Aloof, lately Process and General Supervisory 'D\ Ministry of Defence.
- Matthew Andrews, Industrial Road-Worker, Department of the Environment, Northern Ireland Civil Service.
- John Howard Arscott. For services to the Cancer Research Campaign in Devon.
- Gordon Eric Austin, Sub Divisional Officer, Essex Special Constabulary.
- Monica Pauline Bacon, Telephonist, Dunstable College, Bedfordshire.
- Horace Raymond Joseph Baigent. For services to the Aston Rowant National Nature Reserve.
- Douglas Charles Bailey, Leading Hand Fireman, Aeroplane and Armament Experimental Establishment, Boscombe Down, Ministry of Defence.
- Elsie Bailey, Cleaner, Stand Centre, Bury Metropolitan College.
- Sally Vanessa Bainbridge. For services to the community in Abingdon, Oxfordshire.
- Joga Singh Bains, Craftsman I, Transport and Road Research Laboratory Garage, Department of Transport.
- Michael John Baldock, Milk Roundsman.
- Frederick Banks, Prison Service Auxiliary Officer, H.M. Young Offenders Institution, Styal, Home Office.
- Norman Bannister. For services to swimming.
- Amelia Bateman, Support Grade Band 1 (Senior Messenger), Department of Energy.
- Grace Beck. For services to the community in Thirlmere, Cumbria.
- Maria Caterina Bethell, Support Grade Band I (Senior Messenger), Office of Arts and Libraries.
- Michael Alan Binckes, Constable, Surrey Constabulary.
- Dennis Frederick Blinco, Jig Borer, Self-Changing Gears Ltd.
- Leslie Arthur Bolton, Observer, No. 3 Group, Oxford Royal Observer Corps.
- Leslie Walter Boxshall, Civilian Instructor, No. 2317 (Harlow) Squadron, Air Training Corps.
- (Gil) Gilbert George Boyd, Constable, Cambridgeshire Constabulary.
- Edna Bradburn. For voluntary services to the community in Sheffield.
- William Kenneth Britland. For services to the community in Wirksworth, Derbyshire.
- Leslie Charles Broom, Senior Plaster Room Technician, Bath District Health Authority.
- Carra Anne Brown, Member, Lockerbie Community Liaison Steering Group.
- Thomas Arthur Buckett, Shift Electrician, South Eastern Electricity Board.
- Jessie Burgin, Supervisor of Refectories, University of Sheffield
- Reginald James Burke, Service Engineer, Wales British Gas plc.
- Norman Robert Burns, Commandant, Eastwood Company, St. Andrew's Ambulance Corps.
- Mary Cairney, Senior Supervisor, John J. Lees pic.
- Rhoda Winifred Watt Callaghan, Nursery Assistant, Harrison Nursery School, Lurgan.
- Alec Lindsay Carruthers, Head Porter, Hillingdon Health Authority.
- Eileen Mary Cartwright. For services to the community in Langport, Somerset.
- Edward Castledine, Senior Meat Inspector, Exeter City Council.
- Margaret Chappell, Secretary, the Army Benevolent Fund, North West Region.
- John Michael Cheetham, Detective Constable, Metropolitan Police.
- June Lilian Chivers, Support Manager 1 (Office Keeper 1A), Department of Trade and Industry.
- Rosina Mary Clarke, Support Grade Band I (Senior Messenger), Department of Energy.
- Mervyn Coleman, Constable, Royal Ulster Constabulary.
- Graham John Coombes, Constable, South Wales Constabulary.
- Frederick Douglas Cooper. For services to the Royal British Legion, Bracknell, Berkshire.
- Jonathan Stephen Sydney Couzins, Senior Technical Assistant, Kent Division, Southern Water Authority.
- Ernest Arthur Cox, Postman, West London Letter District, The Post Office.
- David Crawford, Detective Constable, Royal Ulster Constabulary.
- Frances Pamela Creighton, Support Manager 3, Home Office.
- Jacques Edgar Arthur Davies, Senior Head Gardener, Commonwealth War Graves Commission.
- John Michael Davis, Chief Security Officer, British High Commission, Ottawa, Foreign and Commonwealth Office.
- Reginald Dawson, Engineering Foreman, East Midlands Electricity Board.
- Kitty Francis Deal, lately Senior Administrative Assistant, The Adult Education Service, Hertfordshire.
- Barbara Annie Derrick, lately Supervisor, Civil Service Catering Organisation Staff Restaurant, H.M. Treasury.
- Margaret Audrey Dix, Marketing Officer for the Corporation of London's Barbican Estate.
- Robert Arthur Dobson, Shift Foreman, General Steels, British Steel pic.
- Arthur Dodgson, Inspector of Works, Mott MacDonald.
- Anthony Doherty, Support Manager 1 (Office Keeper 1 A) Department of Social Security.
- Alexander Douglas, Chief Observer, Royal Observer Corps.
- Sandy Ernest Dove, Development Worker, Welbeck Colliery, British Coal.
- Margaret Jane Anne Houssemayne-Du Boulay. For services to the Sandwich Town Council, Kent.
- Dilip Dutta. For services to the Asian and Bangladeshi community in Swindon.
- Elisabeth Anderson Eadie, Personal Secretary, Western Education and Library Board, Northern Ireland.
- Evelyn Easterbrook. For Honorary Welfare Officer Services, Sheffield Branch, Royal Air Forces Association.
- William Edge, Postman, Manchester Letter District, The Post Office.
- Alice Ethel Edwards, Centre Officer, Wiltshire Branch, British Red Cross Society.
- Maureen Edwards. For services to mentally disabled people in Llandudno, Gwynedd.
- Janis May Ellis, London Office Manager, GKN Group Services Ltd.
- Derek Ernest Elvin, Major, Salvation Army.
- John Michael Emmerson, Section Leader, Pilkington Optronics.
- Gwyneth Evans. For services to the Women's Royal Voluntary Service in Crymych, Dyfed.
- Arthur William Fancy, lately Poole Harbour Commissioner.
- Sidney Robert Ferguson, Chargehand Porter, St. Thomas's Hospital.
- Jack Charles Finch, Recorder of Work, Devonport Management Ltd.
- Edward Clark Fleeting, Specialist Driver B8, Bailiff of the Royal Parks Office, Central Parks, Department of Environment.
- Francis Edward Foakes, Laboratory Mechanic, Inorganic Materials Division, Building Research Establishment, Department of Environment.
- Mona Fraser, Personal Secretary to Professor of Food and Agricultural Chemistry, Queen's University, Belfast.
- Walter William French, Mechanical Examiner (Electronic), Aquila, Bromley, Ministry of Defence.
- Brian Edward Gale, Social Club Steward, Broadmoor Hospital.
- John Thomas Gallagher, Customer Liaison Officer, Busways Travel Services Ltd.
- William Gilbert. For services to the Deaf Social Club, Leicester and County Mission for the Deaf.
- Brenda Doris Giles. For services to animal welfare in Norfolk.
- Albert James Glass. For services to the St. John Ambulance Brigade, Windsor, Berkshire.
- Joan Edith Goodburn, Registration Clerk, Brent and Harrow Family Practitioners' Committee.
- Ronald Oscar Gooden. For services to the Royal British Legion, Northampton.
- Bernard John Gray, Foreman II, Doncaster Transmission District, Central Electricity Generating Board.
- Thomas James Gray, Driver, Government Car Service, Property Services Agency, Department of Environment.
- James MacIntyre Gunn, Chargehand Gardener, Dounreay, United Kingdom Atomic Energy Authority.
- Mary Ellen Gunning, Support Grade Band 1 (Government Telephonist), Board of Customs and Excise.
- Stewart Andrew Guyan, Senior Security Officer Grade II, Foreign and Commonwealth Office.
- Raymond Arthur Gwynne. For services to the Neath Hospital League of Friends, West Glamorgan.
- Stanley George Hall. For voluntary hospital car services.
- David Colvon Halliday, Chargehand, Sewage Treatment Works Operative.
- Donald Cecil Halsey, Craftsman, National Physical Laboratory, Department of Trade and Industry.
- Annie Hamilton. For services to the Women's Royal Voluntary Service in Newtongrange, Midlothian.
- Anna Marion Hannant. For services to swimming.
- Dorothy Harding. For services to the community in Standon, Staffordshire.
- Dora Lilian Harris, County Treasurer, Avon Branch, St. John Ambulance Brigade.
- Mary Harry. For services to the community in Burry Port, Dyfed.
- Christopher David Helme, Constable, West Yorkshire Police.
- Elizabeth Ellen Higgins, Secretary to the Director of the Arts Council for Northern Ireland.
- Franklin Edward Hood, Postman Higher Grade, Birmingham, The Post Office.
- Clive Romilly Hosken, Antenna Maintenance Supervisor, Wenvoe Transmitting Station, BBC.
- Derrick Howlett, Production Foreman, Rugby Cement Company.
- Dalmain Alfred William Howting, Postman, Sittingbourne, Canterbury Letter District, The Post Office.
- Charles Needham Hunt. For services to the Hailsham Branch, Age Concern.
- Robert Innes, Enhanced Craftsman, North of Scotland Hydro-Electric Board.
- Ronald Robert Jacks, Clerk of Works, Humberside County Council.
- Michael Cyril James, Motorway Supervisor, Leicestershire County Council.
- Evelyn May Jeffery. For services to the community in Bideford, Devon.
- Eric Johnson, LEV Driver, British Embassy, Brussels, Foreign and Commonwealth Office.
- Alexander Johnston, Works Superintendent, Newtonabbey Borough Council.
- George James Johnstone, Hallkeeper, Lockerbie Town Hall.
- Griffith John Jones, lately Coxswain of the Porthdinllaen Lifeboat.
- Thomas Jones. For services to cricket in Merseyside.
- Winifred Rosa Jones. For services to the Minsterley Parish Council, Shropshire.
- Wesley Kane, Supervisor, Harland and Wolff Ltd.
- Bryan Thomas Keens, Joint Transport and General Works Convenor, Stewartby Works, London Brick Company Ltd.
- David Lewis Keggin, Auxiliary Coastguard-in-Charge, Douglas, Isle of Man.
- Wilson Kelly, Sub-Officer, Fire Authority for Northern Ireland.
- John Goodwin Kennedy, lately Road Safety Officer, Strathclyde Regional Council.
- George Maxwell Kerr, Member, Lockerbie Community Liaison Steering Group.
- Keung Chun Mo, Unofficial Chinese Contractor.
- David King, Turner, John Brown Engineering Ltd.
- Peter Harold Kisby, Fireman, Leicester Fire and Rescue Service.
- Stephen Kitching. For services to the community in Kirkby Green, Lincoln.
- Cyril Albert Lane. For services to the Wychwood National Nature Reserve, Oxfordshire.
- Frederick Robert Langdon. For services to the Royal British Legion, West Glamorgan.
- Michael David Lea, Support Manager 3, Public Record Office, Lord Chancellor's Department.
- Geoffrey William Lee, Sergeant, Essex Police.
- Margaret Elizabeth Lewis. For services to the Cherry Tree Housing Association Ltd.
- Marjorie Margaret Lightfoot, Commercial Co-ordinator, ICI Chemicals and Polymers Ltd.
- John McCalley Little, Mortuary Technician, Dumfries and Galloway Health Board.
- Margaret Brenda Lofthouse, Nursing Auxiliary, South West Durham Health Authority.
- Rosemary Madge Lovell, Verger, Trinity Church, HMS Nelson, Ministry of Defence.
- Dennis Macdonald, Chargehand Electrician, Yorkshire Water Authority.
- Mary Elizabeth Macdonald, Postwoman, Tighnabruaich, The Post Office.
- John Alexander Mackie, Sergeant, Fife Constabulary.
- John Allan Macneil. For services to the community in Barra and Vatersay.
- Henry Desmond Maguire, Foreman Stockman, Department of Agriculture, Northern Ireland Civil Service.
- Margaret Mallon, Private Secretary, Armagh District Council.
- Alexander McAldien, lately Caretaker, Newtonhamilton Primary and Secondary Schools.
- Victor McCarthy, Packing and Documentation Supervisor, Cossor Electronics Ltd.
- Joseph McGovern, Machine Shop Turner, Yarrow Shipbuilders Ltd.
- Annie Maria McGuigan. For voluntary services to the Friends of Montgomery House.
- James Kevin Martin McGuinness, lately Driver and Operator, London Buses Ltd.
- Henry McInulty, Head Janitor, St. Andrew's College of Education, Glasgow.
- Helen McKendry, Group Secretary, Ulster Savings Committee.
- James McQueen, Sergeant, Royal Parks Constabulary, Scottish Office.
- John Clements Meek, Boatswain-in-Command, Commander of the Port and Queen's Harbour Master, Clyde, Ministry of Defence.
- Edward Melling, Engine Operator, Wigan Metropolitan Borough Council.
- Margery Middlecote, Secretary and Administrator, STADCO Ltd.
- Geoffrey Charlton Moon, Head Gardener, Wellington, Northumberland.
- Jean Scott Moore. For services to the Women's Royal Voluntary Service in Nottinghamshire.
- John Edward Moore, Labourer, British Nuclear Fuels Ltd.
- James Moores, Group IV Warehouseman, H.M. Stationery Office.
- Ernest Moorley. For services to the community in Doncaster.
- Daniel White Morgan, Cook and Steward, Andrew Weir Shipping Ltd.
- Kenneth Morgan, Divisional Officer, Monmouth Branch, St. John Ambulance Brigade.
- (Joe) Thomas Joseph Mulligan, General Foreman, Balfour Beatty.
- Alfred William Murray, Installation Inspector, Southern Electricity Board.
- Jean Clanachan Murray. For services to the community in Glenluce, Wigtownshire.
- Elsie Florance May Newcombe. For volunteer services to the Plymouth Guild of Community Service.
- Colin Frederick Nightingale, Works Manager Kier Ltd.
- Michael George Norgrove. For services to the community in Oxford.
- Grace Alice North, Cleaner and Caretaker, Community Service Volunteers.
- Margaret Owen, Print Room Operative, Ove Arup and Partners.
- Roger John Owen. For voluntary services to the Cranford Motorcycle Training Scheme.
- William John Owen, Process and General Supervisory 'D', Ministry of Defence.
- Henry Joseph Palmer, Process and General Supervisory *D', Ministry of Defence.
- John Thomas Panton. For services to the Burgh-Le-Marsh Parish Council, Lincolnshire.
- Joseph Jesus Maria Pardo, Electrical Fitter, HM Naval Base, Gibraltar, Ministry of Defence.
- Patricia Mildred Parker. For services to the Women's Royal Voluntary Service in Warwickshire and Powys.
- Malcolm George Parsons, Chauffeur to Chairman, British Railways Board.
- Peter Donald Pearce, lately Life Sciences Ancillary I, Ministry of Defence.
- William Pilkington. For services to the community in Altrincham, Cheshire.
- Dennis Bramwell Powell. For services to the Willesden Hospital League of Friends.
- Neil Alfred Prince, Sub Officer, Staffordshire Fire Brigade.
- Richard Thomas Pugh, Sub Officer Retained, Powys Fire Service.
- Sidney Purcell, Chauffeur, Lucas Aerospace.
- Arthur Charles Purser, Quarry Manager, Hatfield RMC Group Services Ltd.
- Peter Rafferty, Leading Man, Fire Prevention, Coats Viyella pic.
- Frederick George Arthur Rawlings, Support Grade Band 1 (Senior Messenger), Central Office of Information.
- Florence May Reader, Assistant Cleaning Supervisor, University of Birmingham Medical School.
- Terence Albert Reeder, Constable, Nottinghamshire Constabulary.
- Elizabeth Mary Rees. For services to the Lingfield and Home Parish Council, Surrey.
- John Neil Fletcher Reid, Retained Sub Officer, Langholm Fire Station.
- Frank Revill, Higher Class Operative, Anglian Water Authority.
- Hugh McLeod Robertson, Civilian Custodier, Lothian and Borders Police.
- Frances Joy Robinson, Sergeant, Royal Ulster Constabulary.
- Roland Rogers, lately Site Manager, John Laing plc.
- Ruth Mary Rowe. For services to the community in Presteigne, Powys.
- James Smith Roy, lately Theatre Attendant, Bridge of Earn Hospital.
- Eleanor Emily Rudd, lately Housemaid, House of Lords.
- Joseph Cowen Russell, lately Parts General Manager, Grove Coles Ltd., and for services to export.
- Millicent Lucy Saddington. For services to mentally disabled people in Leicestershire.
- William Sayner. For services to the community in Leeds.
- Peter Frank Schollar, Range Foreman, Training Centre, Catterick, Ministry of Defence.
- Sydna Louisa Sexton, Personal Secretary, St. Mark's Hospital, Maidenhead.
- Neville Sharp, Sergeant, West Yorkshire Police.
- William Henry Shaw, Foreman Shipwright, Camper and Nicholsons (Yachts) Ltd.
- William Campbell Simmonds, Superintendent, Royal National Mission to Deep Sea Fishermen, Mallaig.
- Sidney Thomas Simon. For services to the community in Alderney, Channel Islands.
- John Stewart Simpson, lately Craftsman, Nature Conservancy Council.
- Leslie Robb Sinclair, lately Auxiliary Coastguard-in-Charge, Hoy, Orkney Islands.
- Arthur James Sizer, lately Planner Examiner, Royal Naval Aircraft Yard, Fleetlands, Ministry of Defence.
- Victor Francis Skelton, Principal Officer, Prison Service College, Wakefield, Home Office.
- Alice Mary Smart. For services to the community in Colwyn Bay, Clwyd.
- Douglas William Smith, Process and General Supervisory 'C', Ministry of Defence,
- Joyce Smith. For services to the Women's Royal Voluntary Service in the West Midlands.
- Joyce Mary Smith, Senior Supervisor, Microwaves Division, Marconi Electronic Devices Ltd.
- Lorna Margaret Smith. For services to the community in Hastingleigh and Elmsted.
- James William Soanes. For services to the St. John Ambulance Brigade, and to sport.
- Arthur Isaac Riches Southerland. For services to the Brancaster Mussel Fisherman's Association.
- Derek Francis Sowden, District Linen Services Manager, Pontefract Health Authority.
- Geoffrey Charles Sporne, lately Process and General Supervisory 'C, Ministry of Defence.
- Catherine Merry Starr. For fund raising and services to the community in Rhondda, Mid Glamorgan.
- Christine Denise Steel, Centre Organiser, Bexley Branch, British Red Cross Society.
- James Shearer Steel. For masseur services to the Celtic Football Club.
- Melvin Francis Steele, Head Gardener, North Gwent Hospitals.
- Robert Lambie Stewart, Pedigree Stocksman.
- Roderick William Stott. For services to the Bridlington Lifeboat and to the Royal National Lifeboat Institution.
- James Eric Stowe, General Foreman, Docklands Light Railway Project, John Mowlem pic.
- Patrick Owens Strachan, Safety Representative, Babcock Thorn Ltd.
- William Robert Stubbs, Driver, Northern Ireland Office.
- Joan Marjorie Sweet. For services to the Watford General Hospital League of Friends.
- Frank Leonard Tarbard, Senior Instructor, Bircham Newton Training Centre, Construction Industry Training Board.
- Irene Margaret Taylor. For services to the Durham Branch, British Red Cross Society.
- Arthur Ronald Thomas. For services to the Ellesmere Old Age Pensioners' Club.
- David Victor James Thomas, Farm Foreman.
- Norman Thompson, Gardener, Shrewsbury Crematorium, Shrewsbury and Atcham Borough Council.
- Marlene Marion Tolhurst, Catering Manageress Grade 10, Metropolitan Police.
- Veronica Mary Toms. Claims Officer, Metropolitan Police Federation.
- Geoffrey Andrew Towle, Constable, Derbyshire Constabulary.
- Ivor Noel Townsend, Moulder and Coremaker, Worthington Simpson Division, Dresser UK Ltd.
- Francis Colin Truscott, Leading Fireman, London Fire Brigade.
- William David Tucker. For services to the St. John Ambulance Brigade, and to sport.
- Thomas Alfred Vallely. For charitable services.
- Malcolm Clive Walker, Sub-Divisional Officer, West Yorkshire Special Constabulary.
- Bernard Gordon Walklin, Crane Driver, Director General of Supplies and Transport (Naval), Devonport, Ministry of Defence.
- George Henry Thomas Ward, lately Caretaker, Chalfont St. Giles County First School, Buckinghamshire.
- Mary Ward, lately Supervisor, Central Tin Canister Company Ltd.
- Michael Edward Ward. For services to cycling
- David Ross Wares, Postman, Sunderland Letter District, The Post Office.
- Andrew Warwick, Head Gardener, Culzean Castle, Ayrshire.
- Allan Owen Herbert Watkins. For services to the community in Catbrook, Chepstow, Gwent.
- Gerald Arthur Watson, Station Officer, Solent Maritime Rescue Sub-Centre, Department of Transport.
- Desmond Thomas Aston Webb. For services to the East Woodhay Silver Band.
- Richard Webster, Shepherd.
- Keith James Weeks, District Service Officer, Southern British Gas plc.
- Vernon Arthur West, lately for services to the Woodspring District Council.
- Leonard Whiteside, Non-Craft Industrial Chargehand, Springfields Laboratory, United Kingdom Atomic Energy Authority.
- Emily Doris Wilkinson, Press Operator, GEC Telecommunications Ltd.
- James Armstrong Wilson, Farmer.
- John Alexander Chisholm Wilson, Registrar of Births and Deaths, Rushcliffe Registration District.
- Elizabeth Woodward, Administration Officer, National Association of Boys' Clubs.
- Andrew Cheshire Wright, Prison Officer, HM Remand Institution, Longriggend, Scottish Office.
- George Wright. For services to the Mablethorpe and District League of Friends.
- Frances Grace Yorke Batley. For services to the theatrical profession in Bournemouth.
- Joan Lilian Rosemary Young. For services to the Women's Royal Voluntary Service in Merton.

==== Queen's Commendation for Valuable Service in the Air ====
Navy

- Lieutenant Andrew Ralph Edney, Royal Navy.
- Lieutenant Commander Terrence Jane, Royal Navy.
- Lieutenant Commander Kevin John Lambert, Royal Navy.

Army

- Major Donald Charles Maclaine (498177), Army Air Corps.

Air Force

- Squadron Leader Jonathan Gordon Baynton(2623365), Royal Air Force.
- Squadron Leader Donald Rupert Brittain (2512850), Royal Air Force.
- Squadron Leader Peter Lawrence Chandler (2624428), Royal Air Force.
- Squadron Leader Brian Stewart Henley (8025877), Royal Air Force.
- Squadron Leader Alan John Lockwood (5201552), Royal Air Force.
- Flight Lieutenant Paul Scott Logan (4232296), Royal Air Force.
- Wing Commander Wilson Metcalfe (608984), Royal Air Force.
- Squadron Leader George Forrest Nicoll (4027130), Royal Air Force.
- Flight Lieutenant Kenneth Roger Lacey Read (608136), Royal Air Force.
- Squadron Leader William Stephen Smyth (2624903), Royal Air Force.
- Squadron Leader Lester Eric White (5041000), Royal Air Force.

== Diplomatic Service and Overseas ==
=== Knights Bachelor ===
- Justice Derek Cons, Vice-President of the Court of Appeal, Hong Kong.

=== Order of St Michael and St George ===
==== Knights Commander (KCMG) ====
- Michael Romilly Heald Jenkins, CMG, HM Ambassador, The Hague.
- Colin Hugh Verel McColl, CMG, Foreign and Commonwealth Office.
- Alan Gordon Munro, CMG, HM Ambassador, Riyadh.
- John Adam Robson, CMG, HM Ambassador, Oslo.

==== Companions (CMG) ====
- David Elliott Spiby Blatherwick, OBE, Foreign and Commonwealth Office.
- Alastair Jon Breeze, Foreign and Commonwealth Office.
- David Michael Edwards, Foreign and Commonwealth Office.
- Anthony John Fairclough, lately Deputy Director-General (Development Policy), EC Commission, Brussels.
- Maeve Geraldine Fort, HM Ambassador, Maputo.
- Terence Garrett, CBE, Counsellor (Science and Technology), HM Embassy, Moscow.
- The Honourable David Alwyn Gore-Booth, Foreign and Commonwealth Office.
- Dr Denis Gordon Osborne, British High Commissioner, Lilongwe.
- Michael Julian Barham Palmer, lately Deputy Director-General for Research, Secretariat of the European Parliament, Luxembourg.
- Walter Kieran Prendergast, British High Commissioner, Harare.
- Alexander Basil Peter Smart, HM Ambassador, Suva.
- Terence Harry Steggle, HM Ambassador, Asuncion.
- Roger Westbrook, British High Commissioner, Bander Seri Begawan.

=== Order of the British Empire ===
==== Knights Commander (KBE) ====
Civil Division

- John William David Swan, J.P. For public services in Bermuda.

==== Commanders (CBE) ====
Civil Division

- Ronald George Blacker Bridge, O.B.E, J.P., Secretary for Education and Manpower, Hong Kong.
- Geoffrey Kemp Caston. For services to university education in the South Pacific.
- John Walter Chambers, O.B.E., J.P., lately Secretary for Health and Welfare, Hong Kong.
- Michael Hart. For services to education in Luxembourg.
- Stanley Charles Hunt, lately Director of Finance and Development, Council of Europe Secretariat, Strasbourg.
- Dr. Clarence Eldridge James, J.P. For public services in Bermuda.
- Arthur Everard Butler Laurence, O.B.E., Honorary British Consul, Cali, Colombia.
- Li Kwan-ha, Q.P.M., C.P.M., Commissioner of Police, Hong Kong.
- Professor William Ian Mackay McIntyre. For services to veterinary research in The Gambia.
- Michael Warren Parkinson. For services to British commercial interests in Australia.
- Dr. Robert Thomas Taylor, British Council Representative, Greece.
- Professor David Todd, O.B.E., J.P. For services to medical education in Hong Kong.
- Christopher John Turner, OBE, Governor of Montserrat.

==== Officers (OBE) ====
Military Division
Army

- Lieutenant Colonel Edward Alfred Guerrero, The Gibraltar Regiment.

Civil Division

- The Right Reverend Robert Michael Cawthorn Beak. For welfare services to the community in Northern Kenya.
- David John Morton Blackler. For services to British commercial and community interests in Sri Lanka.
- Dr Judith Brown. For medical and welfare services to the community in The Gambia.
- Cheng Hon-kwan, J.P. For public services in Hong Kong.
- Anthony John Cook. For services to British commercial interests in Greece.
- Dr. John Joseph Yelverton Dawson, M.C. For medical and welfare services to the community in Cameroon.
- Alice Ivy Durdey, M.B.E. For nursing and welfare services to the community in Cyprus.
- Peter Leonard Elborn, British Council Representative, Iraq.
- Kenneth Fang Hung, J.P. For public and community services in Hong Kong.
- Sir Robert Francis Alexandra Ffolkes, Bt. For welfare services to children in South Asia.
- Harold Fish, English Language Officer, British Council, Germany.
- David Anthony Godfrey. For welfare services to the community in Namibia.
- Dr. Anthony John Haines, lately Medical Adviser to H.M. Diplomatic Service.
- Alexander Hardie, First Secretary, British High Commission, Lusaka.
- Hugh Gordon Herring. For services to British commercial interests in Germany.
- Stanley Ho. For services to the community in Hong Kong.
- Charles Thomas John. Financial Secretary, Montserrat.
- Clive John Kennedy. For services to British commercial interests in Germany.
- Lau Wong-fat, M.B.E., J.P. For public and community services in Hong Kong.
- Owen Herbert Phillips. For services to the British community in Qatar.
- Charles Anthony Shaw. For services to British commercial interests in Spain.
- Graham Edward Stockwell, Q.P.M., Deputy Commissioner, ICAC, Hong Kong.
- Dorothy Margaret Symes, lately First Secretary, Commercial, H.M. Embassy, Vienna.
- David Richard Thomas, lately British Council Representative, Bahrain.
- Ivo John Towner, First Secretary and Consul, HM Embassy, Tel Aviv.
- Alan Wrigley. For services to British commercial interests in France.
- Yao Kong, J.P. For public and community services in Hong Kong.

==== Members (MBE) ====
Military Division
Army

- Warrant Officer Class 1 Li Cheuk-Yin, Royal Hong Kong Regiment (The Volunteers).
- Warrant Officer Class 1 Louis Henry Lopez, The Gibraltar Regiment.
- Major Ronald Duxbury Taylor, Royal Hong Kong Regiment (The Volunteers).

Civil Division'

- Keith Vernon Arrowsmith. For services to the British community in Brussels.
- Roger Austen, lately First Secretary, Administration, H.M. Embassy, Athens.
- Michael Austin. For public and community services in the Cayman Islands.
- Cecilia Agnes Baldachino. For services to the community in Gibraltar.
- Jessie Booth, J.P. For services to the community in the Falkland Islands.
- Joan Mary Boyer. For services to Anglo-French relations in Normandy.
- Carter Brookes, lately Third Secretary, H.M. Embassy, Moscow.
- John Shrel Bryant. For services to education in Ecuador and to Anglo-Ecuadorian relations.
- Errol Lennox Bush, Director of Ports, Port Authority, Cayman Islands.
- Albray Victor Butterfield. For public services in the Turks and Caicos Islands.
- Robert Canning, M.V.O., lately First Secretary, Consular, British High Commission, Nicosia.
- Madam Anita Chan Lai-ling, J.P. For services to the community in Hong Kong.
- Gregory Chan Tak-ping, J.P., Assistant Director of Housing, Hong Kong.
- Mrs. Rosaline Chiu Shum Shuk-haan, Principal Inspector of Physical Education, Hong Kong.
- Dr. Nelson Chow Wing-sun, J.P. For public services in Hong Kong.
- Arthur Osborne Cload. For services Anglo-Canadian relations in Edmonton.
- Pamela Constant. For services to the British community in Paris.
- Patrick Robert Cook. For services to British community interests in Caracas.
- Sister Judith Ellen Dean. For educational and welfare services to the community in Swaziland.
- The Reverend Fr. William Dowds. For educational and welfare services to the community in Kenya.
- Jack Anthony Eden, First Secretary and Consul, H.M. Embassy, Lisbon.
- Dennis Walter Emberley, C.D., Consular Assistant, British Consulate-General, Vancouver.
- The Reverend James Laird McLelland Farmborough. For welfare services to the community in Valparaiso.
- Dennis George Garner. For services to the British community in Zambia.
- Norma Geach. For services to education in Saudi Arabia.
- Alonzo Alexander Gibbs. For public services in the Turks and Caicos Islands.
- Dorothy Elizabeth Greenway. For services to education in Montserrat.
- John James Frederick Grundy. For services to the British community in Rome.
- David George Harries, Attache, H.M. Embassy, Beirut.
- Eric Henry Harrold, First Secretary, H.M. Embassy, Moscow.
- Arthur Howes. For services to the British aviation interests in France.
- Doreen Janet Hutchings, lately Personal Secretary, British High Commission, Nairobi.
- Margaret Eileen Krinker. For services to the British community in São Paulo.
- The Reverend Dr. Vernon George Lambe. For services to the community in Bermuda.
- Elizabeth Mary Lammond. For educational and welfare services to children in Zambia.
- Lee Man-ban, J.P. For services to the community in Hong Kong.
- Harry Leong Siu-har, Commercial Officer, British Trade Commission, Hong Kong.
- Liu Lit-for. For services to the community in Hong Kong.
- Ann Malamah-Thomas, lately Assistant Representative, British Council, Bangladesh.
- Enzo Masi, Vice-Consul, British Consulate, Florence.
- Janet Turnbull Moncur, Director of Nursing Services, Gibraltar.
- The Very Reverend John Fearnley Parkinson. For services to the British community in Bahrain.
- Roy Parkinson, Second Secretary, (Administration), British Trade Commission, Hong Kong.
- Vincent Luigi Gaetano Petti. For services to English language teaching in Sweden.
- Ileana Mary Reynolds, Commercial Assistant, British Consulate-General, San Francisco.
- Proctor Carlisle Scott. For services to education in the British Virgin Islands.
- Jacqueline Madeleine Regine Shama. For services to the British community in Madrid.
- Meryl Joyce Shepherd. For educational and welfare services to children in Zambia.
- Harbhajan Singh, Consular Clerk, British High Commission, New Delhi.
- Peter James Chalmers Smith. For public services in Bermuda.
- Ronald Donald Southern. For services to Anglo-Canadian relations in Calgary.
- Marguerite Mary Rose Sparks. For services to education and the British community in Abu Dhabi.
- David Yeaman Spence, lately Secretariat-General of the EC Council, Brussels.
- Patrick John Sullivan, Second Secretary, (Works), British High Commission, Ottawa.
- Annie Penelope Synnott. For welfare services to refugees in Jordan.
- Donald Henry Thompson. For services to the British community and to Anglo-Kenyan relations in Nairobi.
- Robin Geoffrey Charles Thorneycroft. For services to the British community in Malawi.
- Geoffrey Passmore Towill, Consular Clerk, British Consulate-General, São Paulo.
- John Anthony Tucknott, Second Secretary, H.M. Embassy, Beirut.
- John Michael Turner, Chief Engineer, Government Eastern Harbour Crossing Office, Hong Kong.
- The Reverend Selwyn Lorenzo Vanterpool. For services to the community in the British Virgin Islands.
- Dr. Samuel Wong Ping-wai, J.P. For services to the community in Hong Kong.
- Janette Rittenhouse Zuill. For services to the community in Bermuda.

=== Imperial Service Order ===
- Dr. Laurence Lee Hay-yue, J.P., Director of Agriculture and Fisheries, Hong Kong.
- Dr. Lee Shiu-hung, J.P., Deputy Director of Medical and Health Services, Hong Kong.
- Wong Kwok-lai, J.P., Director of Water Supplies, Hong Kong.

=== British Empire Medal ===
- Chan Ying-kuy, Chief Customs Officer, Customs and Excise Department, Hong Kong.
- Chow Kun-kai, Housing Assistant, Housing Department, Hong Kong.
- Viola Chung Po-ping, Group Supervisor, Auxiliary Medical Services, Hong Kong.
- Charles John Conroy. For community services in Gibraltar.
- Orilee Ebanks, Purchasing Supervisor, Government Hospital, Cayman Islands.
- Durl Benton Grant, Senior Superintendent, Public Works Department, Cayman Islands.
- Lee Wah-tak, Principal Technical Officer (Traffic), Transport Department, Hong Kong.
- Hubert Ernest Eugene Swan, lately Driver to His Excellency the Governor of Bermuda.
- Tam Yiu-wah, Laundry Manager, Medical and Health Department, Hong Kong.
- Tang Kwok-ching, Principal Survey Officer, Buildings and Lands Department, Hong Kong.
- Charles Tilbury. For community services in Gibraltar.
- Un Kam-wah, Senior Clerical Officer, Customs and Excise Department, Hong Kong.
- Godfrey Yim, Tunnel Superintendent, Transport Department, Hong Kong.

== Cook Islands ==
=== Order of the British Empire ===
==== Officer of the Order of the British Empire (OBE) ====
Civil Division

- Percy Frederick Henderson. For services to the community.

=== British Empire Medal (BEM) ===
Civil Division

- David Marama Hosking. For services to education, sport and the community.
- Aumatangi Mataa, For services to the community.
- Valentine George Alfred Fritz Jordan Savage. For services to education and the community.

== Barbados ==
=== Knights Bachelor ===
- Dr. George Allanmore Ogarren Alleyne. For services to medicine.

=== Order of the British Empire ===
==== Officers of the Order of the British Empire (OBE) ====
- Owen Oswald Eversley. For services to the community.
- Victor Gormon Stuart. For public service.

== Mauritius ==
=== Knight Bachelor ===
- Dr. Djamil Sheik Fareed. For services to medicine.

=== Order of Saint Michael and Saint George ===
==== Companion of the Order of St Michael and St George (CMG) ====
- Joseph Rene Herbert Couacaud. For service to tourism.

=== Order of the British Empire ===
==== Commander of the Order of the British Empire (CBE) ====
- Joseph Marcel Clement Lagesse. For services to agriculture and industry.
- Dr. Jagdis Chundur Mohith. For services to public health.

==== Officer of the Order of the British Empire (OBE) ====
- Marie Therese Denyse, Mrs. Vaulbert de Chantilly. For services to the community.
- Nairainduth Dookhony. For services to the sugar industry.

==== Member of the Order of the British Empire (MBE) ====
- Ishnoo Govinda. For services to the community.
- Hajee Inouce Lowton. For services to the community.
- Rowonparsad Manghi. For services to the community.
- Miss Dhanonlutchmee Paratian. For public service.
- Jean Marc Régis Silavant. For public service.
- Francois Ramalmgum Sockalingum. For services to the community.
- Moonindra Nath Varma. For services to education.
- Jagadissa Venctasamy. For services to the community.

=== Mauritius Police Medal ===
- Jean Benoit Travailleur, Superintendent of Police
- Sockalinghum Arunasalon, Chief Inspector of Police.
- Giandeoh Hurry, Police Quartermaster.
- Mohammed Ishack Saumtally. Police Sergeant.

== Grenada ==
=== Order of the British Empire ===
==== Commander of the Order of the British Empire (CBE) ====
- Cosmo Allan St. Bernard. For public service.

==== Member of the Order of the British Empire (MBE) ====
- Hezekiah Cromwell. For services to the sugar industry.
- Orleans Elias John. For services to education.
- Ruth Athelina, Mrs. Rahim. For public service.

== Solomon Islands ==
=== Order of the British Empire ===
==== Knight Commander of the Order of the British Empire (KBE) ====
- Lloyd Maepeza Gina, C.B.E. For public service.

==== Officer of the Order of the British Empire (OBE) ====
- Japhlei Bobbe Oifena Kwanairara. For public service.

==== Member of the Order of the British Empire (MBE) ====
- Peter Kakai. For public service.

=== British Empire Medal (BEM) ===
- Methyline Hahe, Mrs. Roheau. For services to public health.
- Christopher Wasimani. For public service.

== Saint Lucia ==
=== Order of the British Empire ===
==== Officer of the Order of the British Empire (OBE) ====
- Kenneth Allan Patrick Monplaisir, Q.C. For public service.

==== Member of the Order of the British Empire (MBE) ====
- Cornelius Lincoln Lubin. For public service.
- Camille Audrey, Mrs. Rapier. For services to the community.

== Saint Vincent and the Grenadines ==
=== Order of the British Empire ===
==== Member of the Order of the British Empire (MBE) ====
- Stuart Bedford Gill. For services to scouting.

== Belize ==
=== Order of the British Empire ===
==== Commander of the Order of the British Empire (CBE) ====
- Barney William Isaacs. For services to industry.

==== Officer of the Order of the British Empire (OBE) ====
- Sidney Turton. For services to industry and commerce.
- Manuela Torres, Mrs. Young. For services to the community.

==== Member of the Order of the British Empire (MBE) ====
- Fransisco Javier Castellanos. For services to industry.
- William Quinto. For services to the community.

== Antigua and Barbuda ==
=== Order of the British Empire ===
==== Officer of the Order of the British Empire (OBE) ====
- Miss Yvonne Maginley, M.B.E. For services to tourism.

== Saint Christopher and Nevis ==
=== British Empire Medal (BEM) ===
- James Arlington Ferguson. For services to education and the community.
