= Patrick Rowe =

Patrick Rowe may refer to:

- Patrick Rowe (American football) (born 1969), American football player
- Patrick Rowe (cricketer) (born 2001), Australian cricketer
- Patrick Rowe (Royal Navy officer) (1939–2025), British Royal Navy officer
