= John Swan (Bermudian politician) =

Premier of Bermuda (1935–2026)

The Honourable Sir John Swan KBE JP
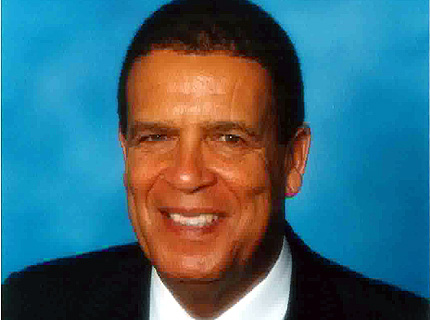

4th Premier of Bermuda
- In office 15 January 1982 – 25 August 1995
- Monarch: Elizabeth II
- Deputy: Clarence James (1983–1989); Ann Cartwright DeCouto (1989–1992)
- Preceded by: David Gibbons
- Succeeded by: David Saul

Personal details
- Born: 3 July 1935 Bermuda
- Died: 4 June 2026 (aged 90)
- Party: United Bermuda Party (1964–2011); One Bermuda Alliance (2011–?)

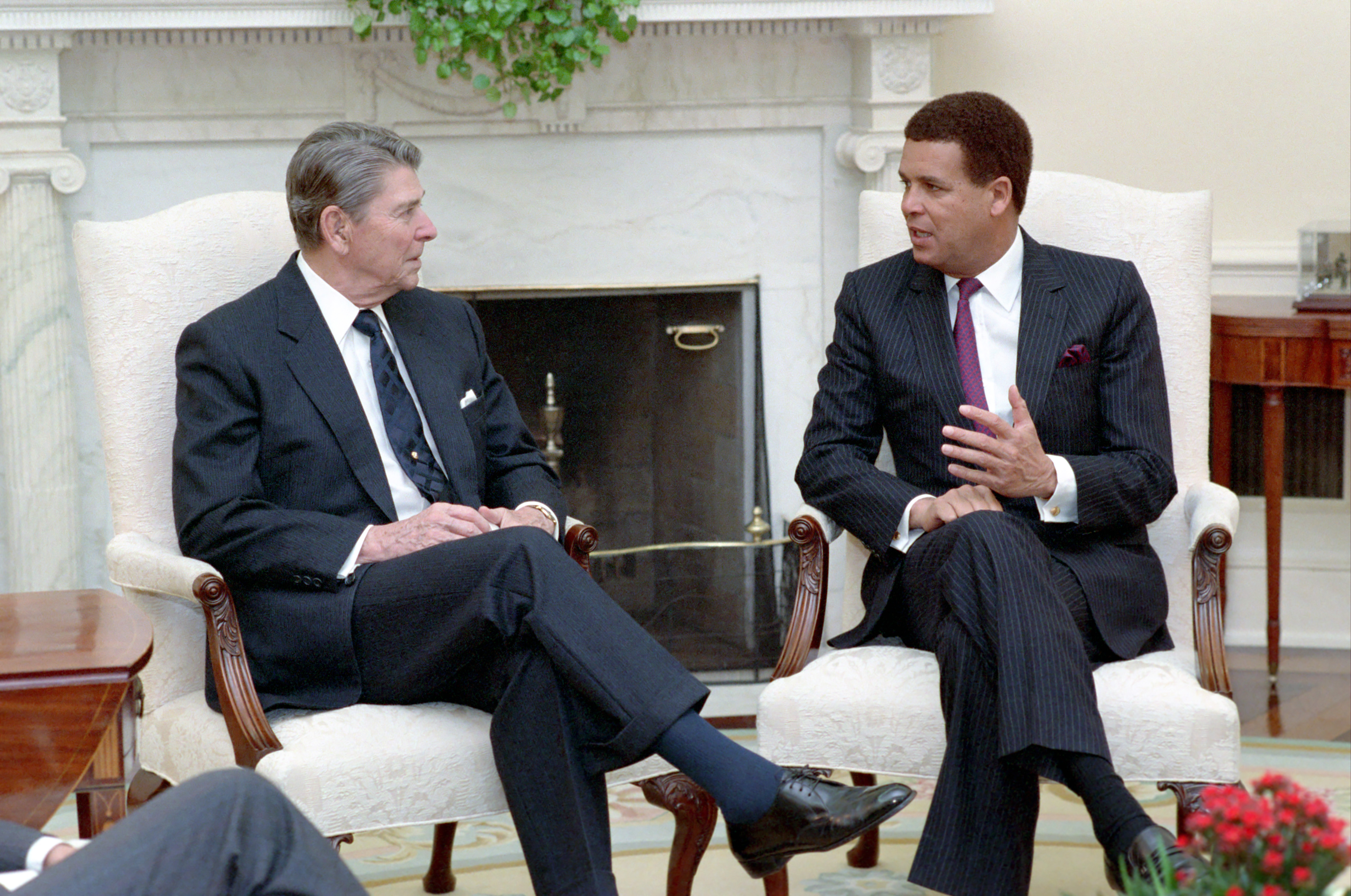
Swan with US President Ronald Reagan in 1988

Sir John William David Swan KBE JP (3 July 1935 – 4 June 2026) was a Bermudian politician. A real estate developer, Swan was Premier of Bermuda from 1982 to 1995.

== Premiership ==
Elected to Parliament in 1972, Swan established the island as a major offshore financial center. Under his stewardship the Government completed in excess of 20 major projects.

In 1985 Swan led the negotiations and the completion of the Tax Treaty with the United States. The agreement resulted in the development of the insurance and reinsurance industries. The Bermuda delegation held several meetings with the most senior officials in the U.S. Government including the President, Vice-President, Secretary of the Treasury, Secretary of State, and National Security Advisor in order to successfully implement a tax treaty between Bermuda and the United States. These initiatives created a foundation for the island's stable economy, well-developed infrastructure, and regulatory framework.

Swan favoured Bermuda's independence from Britain, holding a referendum on the issue in 1995; when this proposal was overwhelmingly rejected, he resigned as Premier. Swan voted against the Stubbs Bill decriminalising homosexuality in Bermuda. However, the Bill passed without Swan's support.

In addition to serving as the Premier, Swan was the Minister of Immigration and Labour from 1976 to 1982, the Minister of Marine and Air Services from 1975 to 1976, and Chairman of Bermuda Hospitals Board. He was also a founding member of the Bermuda Monetary Authority, Director of the Bermuda Chamber of Commerce, and a Director of the Bermuda Employers Council.

Swan transformed international trade, politics, and property development in Bermuda.On the 1990 New Years Honours List he was appointed by Her Majesty the Queen a Knight Commander of the Order of the British Empire (KBE). In 1986 Swan was awarded the Medal of Distinction in recognition of his humanitarian endeavours from the International Association of Lions Clubs. Swan received the International Medal of Excellence from the Poor Richard Club of Philadelphia, the oldest press and advertising club in Philadelphia. He was admitted as a Senator to the Membership and Fellowship of the Senate of the Junior Chamber of Commerce. In 2002 Swan was awarded the St. Paul's A.M.E. Outstanding Service Award.

A legislative bill was drafted to prevent Swan from establishing McDonald's restaurants on Bermuda. Ann Cartwright DeCouto, Swan's former Deputy Premier, introduced the Prohibited Restaurants Act to Parliament to stop the proposed McDonald's. The House voted in favour of the ban in 1996, but the appointed Senate rejected the ban. Swan intended to challenge the legality of the law in the Supreme Court of Bermuda. Then-Premier David Saul, who approved Swan's intentions in December 1995, resigned in March 1997 after a controversy over his decision and Swan's plans.

== Personal life and death ==
Swan was born on 3 July 1935. He was chairman of the Swan Group of Companies. Swan held a Bachelor of Arts degree from West Virginia Wesleyan College. In addition, he was awarded a B.A. Honorary Fellowship at Bermuda College, honorary doctorates from West Virginia Wesleyan College, Atlantic Union College, and Morris Brown College.

Swan died on 4 June 2026, at the age of 90.
