= Desmond McCourt =

Rugby union player from Northern Ireland

Desmond McCourt OBE
- Born: 13 December 1923 Portadown, Northern Ireland
- Died: 21 April 2015 (aged 91) Aghadowey, County Londonderry, Northern Ireland
- School: Royal Belfast Academical Institution
- University: Queen's University Belfast
- Occupation: Academic

Rugby union career
- Position: No. 8
International career
Years	Team	Apps	(Points)
1947	Ireland	1	(0)

Desmond McCourt (13 December 1923 — 21 April 2015) was an Irish academic and international rugby union player.

== Biography ==
A native of Portadown, McCourt was the son of local councillor Harry McCourt and attended Edenderry Public Elementary School, before being sent to the Royal Belfast Academical Institution (RBAI). He learned his rugby at RBAI and captained the first XV to the Ulster Schools' Cup title his final year. After completing his studies, McCourt attended Queen's University Belfast on a Lord Kitchener Scholarship.

McCourt opted to play rugby for Instonians during his first few years at Queen's University. He first represented Ireland in the 1945–46 Victory Internationals, but didn't receive an official cap until 1947, by which time he had begun playing for Queen's University RFC. His cap came as a number eight against the touring Wallabies at Lansdowne Road and would be his only capped appearance. As an Ulster player, McCourt also featured against the Springboks. He made over 40 appearances for Ulster.

Graduating from Queen's University with a PhD, McCourt was appointed head of the newly formed Geography department of Magee University College in the early 1950s and in 1957 received a Rockefeller Foundation Fellowship to Yale University, where he undertook research on the influence of Ulster-Scottish settlers to the United States. He served six years as Chairman of the Northern Ireland Historic Monuments Council and was made an OBE in the 1990 New Year Honours.

== See also ==
- List of Ireland national rugby union players
