= Derek Cons =

British Hong Kong judge (1928–2025)

Sir Derek Cons (15 July 1928 – 22 August 2025) was a British colonial judge who was one of the three Vice-Presidents of the Court of Appeal of the Supreme Court of Hong Kong from 1986 to 1993.

Cons was called to the bar at Gray's Inn in 1953 after he was graduated from the University of Birmingham. He joined the Judiciary of Hong Kong in 1955 as a Magistrate and was promoted as a District Judge in 1966 and a Puisne Judge of the Supreme Court in 1972. During his long judicial career in Hong Kong, he presided over a large number of civil and criminal trials. Notable examples include the drug dealing case of Ng Sik-ho, notoriously known as "Limpy Ho", who was heavily sentenced to 30 years' imprisonment in 1975, as well as the case of Sit Ping, a reporter of Xinhua News Agency who was sentenced to two years' imprisonment in 1967 for his involvement in illegal assemblies and aggressive acts during the leftist riots. In 1971, he was appointed by the government to chair a commission of inquiry to investigate the disastrous fire which took place on board the Jumbo Floating Restaurant.

Cons was promoted to the Court of Appeal as a Justice of Appeal in 1980, becoming a Vice-President in 1986 and the Senior Vice-President the following year. As an expert of corporate and company law, he was, in addition to his duties in the Court of Appeal, the founding Chairman of the Standing Committee on Company Law Reform from 1984 to 1991 as well as the Chairman of the Advisory Committee on Legal Education from 1987 to 1993. As the judge with the highest seniority in the Judiciary, he was on the list to succeed the retiring Chief Justice, Sir Denys Roberts, in 1988. However, the opportunity was passed to Sir Ti-liang Yang, another Vice-President who was an ethnic Chinese and was one year junior to him in terms of seniority. In recognition of his judicial services, he was knighted in 1990.

Although Cons retired from the Hong Kong Judiciary in 1993, he continued to serve as a Judicial Commissioner of the Supreme Court of Brunei Darussalam on part-time basis. He was subsequently appointed one of the first Non-Permanent Hong Kong Judges of the Court of Final Appeal of Hong Kong in 1997, as well as the President of the Court of Appeal of Brunei in 2003. In 2000 and 2006 in Brunei, he twice took part in the trials of Prince Jefri Bolkiah, younger brother of Sultan of Brunei Hassanal Bolkiah, who was accused of embezzling £8 billion from the government. Cons formally relinquished his positions from the Hong Kong and Brunei Judiciaries in 2006, marking the end of his 51-year long judicial career.
