= Yvonne Maginley =

Antiguan composer and deputy governor-general (d. 2019)

Dame Yvonne Maginley DCN, CMG, OBE, OD
- Died: January 27, 2019
- Resting place: St. John's Public Cemetery
- Occupation: Musician

Where Land and Sea Make Beauty
Patriotic song composed by Maginley. Lyrics by B. O. Breton.

Dame Yvonne Maginley, DCN, CMG, OBE, OD was an Antiguan composer and the former deputy governor-general of Antigua and Barbuda. Maginley composed many of the nation's patriotic songs, including "Where Land and Sea Make Beauty". She attended the T. O. R. Memorial School and later joined the Antigua Broadcasting Service as programme organiser. She received broadcasting training from the BBC in London.

Maginley later entered the tourism industry and became the executive secretary of the Antigua Tourism Board in 1958. She is considered one of the persons that led the conversion of Antigua and Barbuda from an agriculture-based economy into a tourism-based one. She was also a founding member of the Caribbean Tourism Association, now the Caribbean Tourism Organisation.

In 2003 Maginley received a knighthood. Maginley died on 27 January 2019 and was buried at the St. John's Public Cemetery. At her funeral she was honoured with a 21-gun salute.

== Works ==
- "Where Land and Sea Make Beauty"
- "Rejoice"
- "Antigua the Beautiful"
- "Antiguan Medley"
- "Birthday of the Nation"
- "The Unsung Heroes"
- "Independence Hymn"
- "We Thank Thee Lord"
