= Bryan Harrison =

British virologist (born 1931)

Bryan Desmond Harrison CBE, FRS (born 16 June 1931) is a British virologist, and professor emeritus at the University of Dundee.

== Works ==
- Adrian J. Gibbs, Bryan D. Harrison, Plant virology: the principles, Wiley, 1976, ISBN 978-0-470-15040-5
- Bryan D. Harrison, A. F. Murant (eds) Polyhedral virions and bipartite RNA genomes, Plenum Press, 1996, ISBN 978-0-306-45225-3
- Michael W. Bevan, Bryan D. Harrison, C. J. Leaver (eds) The production and uses of genetically transformed plants, Chapman & Hall, 1994, ISBN 978-0-412-60060-9
