= Rodney Fitch =

Rodney Arthur Fitch, CBE (19 August 1938 – 20 October 2014) was an English designer. He founded the design company Fitch in 1972, and rejoined it as chairman and CEO in 2004. He was appointed Commander of The Most Excellent Order of the British Empire (CBE) in 1990 for his 'influence on the British Design Industry'.

Fitch died of cancer on 20 October 2014, at the age of 76.

== Background ==
Fitch had a successful career in design which allowed him to be active in the development of design education and the arts in the United Kingdom. At the time of his death he held the title of Senior Governor of the University of the Arts, located in London. Fitch was awarded a Commander of the Order of the British Empire in 1990 for his influence on the British design industry.

== Experience ==
Fitch had the following experience:

- trustee of the Victoria & Albert Museum
- Chairman of V & A Enterprises
- member of the Design Council
- A member of the Council of the Royal College of Art
- President of the Designers and Art Directors Association
- President of Chartered Society of Designers
