= Clarence James =

Deputy Premier of Bermuda
- In office 1983–1989
- Premier: John Swan
- Preceded by: ?
- Succeeded by: Ann Cartwright DeCouto

Personal details
- Born: August 27, 1931 Bermuda
- Died: April 16, 2016 (aged 84) Hamilton, Bermuda
- Party: United Bermuda Party
- Spouse: Shirley James
- Children: 3
- Education: McGill University

Clarence Eldridge James, CBE (August 27, 1931 – April 16, 2016) was a Bermudian surgeon and politician. He was a member of the House of Assembly of Bermuda, representing the Pembroke West Central constituency for the former the United Bermuda Party (UBP), for 21 years from 1968 to 1989. He served as the head of several government ministries, including Minister of Transport, Minister of Finance (becoming the first Black Bermudian to lead the Ministry of Finance), and Minister of Health. He then served as Deputy Premier of Bermuda from 1983 to 1989, during the government of Premier John Swan.

James was born in Bermuda in August 1931. He married his wife, Shirley, with whom he had three children: Joanne, Robert, and Charles.
