= Carter Jonas =

Estate agent in the United Kingdom

Carter Jonas LLP
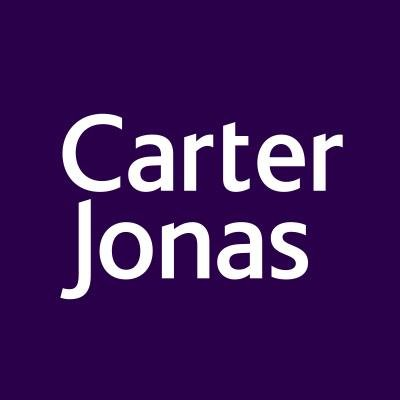
- Company type: Private
- Industry: Property consultants and Estate agents
- Founded: 1855; 171 years ago
- Headquarters: One Chapel Place, London, UK
- Products: Residential, Infrastructure, Commercial, Planning, Development and Rural property services
- Number of employees: 1000
- Website: www.carterjonas.co.uk

Carter Jonas LLP is a limited liability partnership and firm of property consultants, chartered surveyors, chartered planners and estate agents with offices in England, Scotland and Wales. They advise a broad range of individuals, companies and institutions.

The current chairman is James Bainbridge FRICS and chief executive is Richard Bruce.

== History ==
The roots of the firm go back to 1759 but it takes its name from John Carter Jonas, who established an office in Cambridge in 1855. It merged with Dreweatt Neate in 2009 and is one of the largest firms of property consultants in the UK, with 32 offices and approximately 1000 employees.

== Services ==
- Sales, Acquisitions and Lettings.
- Residential, Rural and Commercial services.
- Property Management and Valuation.
- Energy, Planning, Minerals, Waste and Marine.
- Architecture and Building Design.
