= Patrick Rowe (Royal Navy officer) =

British Royal Navy officer (1939–2025)

Rear-Admiral Sir Patrick Barton Rowe KCVO CBE (14 April 1939 – 27 January 2025) was a British Royal Navy officer.

== Biography ==
The son of a Royal Navy captain, Rowe entered the Navy himself in 1960; after serving in the Far East Fleet and then in various command and staff roles, he was appointed Military Deputy to the head of the government's Defence Export Services Organisation in 1990, serving until 1992. The following year, he became clerk to the Worshipful Company of Leathersellers, and then in 1996 he was appointed Deputy Master of Trinity House and Chairman of the General Lighthouse Authority. He retired in 2002 and was appointed a Knight Commander of the Royal Victorian Order in that year's New Year Honours. He had been appointed a Commander of the Order of the British Empire in the 1990 New Year Honours.

Rowe died on 27 January 2025, at the age of 85.
