= Darrel =

Darrel is a given name. Notable people with the name include:

- Darrel Akerfelds (1962–2012), American baseball pitcher and bullpen coach
- Darrel Anholt (born 1962), Canadian ice hockey defenceman
- Darrel Aschbacher (born 1935), American football player
- Darrel Aubertine (born 1953), American politician in the New York State Senate
- Darrel Baldock (1938–2011), Australian rules football player and coach
- Darrel Brown (born 1984), sprinter from Trinidad and Tobago
- Darrel Brown (basketball) (1923–1990), American basketball player
- Darrel Castillo (born 1992) Guatemalan judoka
- Darrel Chaney (born 1948), American baseball player and announcer
- Darrel Chapman (1937–1992), Australian rugby league player
- Darrel Cunningham (born 1948), Canadian politician
- Darrel R. Falk (born 1946), American biologist
- Darrel Frost (born 1951), American herpetologist and systematist
- Darrel Guilbeau (born 1962), American actor
- Darrel Verner Heald (1919–2010), Canadian lawyer and political figure
- Darrel Higham (born 1970), English rockabilly guitarist
- Darrel Johnson (born 1959), American basketball coach
- Darrel Knibbs (born 1949), Canadian ice hockey player
- Darrel McHargue (born 1954), American horse racing jockey
- Darrel R. Miller (1929-2010), American farmer and politician
- Darrel Mosel, American politician from Minnesota
- Darrel Peterson (1939–1994), American politician from Minnesota
- Darrel Petties (born 1983), American gospel musician, worship leader and pastor
- Darrel Ray (born 1950), American psychologist
- Darrel Reid (born 1957), Canadian policy advisor and political manager
- Darrel Scoville (born 1975), Canadian ice hockey defenceman
- Darrel Stinson (born 1945), Canadian politician from British Columbia
- Darrel Sutton (born c. 1948), Canadian curler
- Darrel Treece-Birch (born 1967), English rock keyboard player and songwriter
- Darrel Williams (born 1995), American football running back and fullback
- Darrel Young (born 1987), American football fullback

== See also ==
- Darrell
- Darel
- Darell
- Darroll
- Daryl
- Darryl
- Durrell
- Derrell
