= Darell =

Darell is a given name derived from an English surname, which was derived from Norman-French d'Airelle, originally denoting one who came from Airelle in France. There are no longer any towns in France called Airelle, but airelle is the French word for huckleberry. Notable people with the name include:

== Given name ==
=== Arts and entertainment ===
- Darell (rapper), Puerto Rican rapper
- Darell Koons (1924–2016), American painter

=== Politics ===
- Darell baronets, one of two baronetcies created for persons with the surname Darell. Two distinct lines exist, Darell baronets of West Woodhay and Darell baronets of Richmond Hill
- Darell Leiking, also known as Ignatius Dorell Leiking (born 1971), Malaysian politician and government minister
- Darell Trelawny or Trelawney (c. 1695–1727), of Coldrenick, near Liskeard, Cornwall, was a British politician who sat in the House of Commons briefly in 1727

=== Sports ===
- Darell Garretson (1932–2008), American professional basketball NBA referee
- Darell Scott (born 1986), a former American football defensive tackle
- Darell Tokpa (born 2001), French footballer

=== Others ===
- Darell Hammond, American philanthropist, founder of the non-profit organization KaBOOM! that helps communities build playgrounds for children

== Middle name ==
- George Darell Shee (1843–1894), English judge

== Surname ==
- Darell (surname)

== Fictional characters ==
- Arkady Darell, the daughter of Toran Darell II and the granddaughter of Toran and Bayta Darell in the series Foundation

== See also ==
- Darrell
- Darrel
- Darel
- Darroll
- Daryl
- Darryl
- Durrell
- Derrell
