= Darrell (surname) =

Darrell is a surname, and may refer to:

- Bert Darrell (1905–1983), Bermudian sailor
- Bracken Darrell, American CEO
- Charles Darrell (1859–1932), English playwright
- Dimebag Darrell (1966–2004), American heavy metal guitarist and songwriter
- Deunte Darrell (born 1992), Bermudian cricketer
- Edmund Darrell (by 1492 – 1536/40), English politician.
- Edward Darrell (died 1530) (died 1530), English politician
- Edward Darrell (died 1573) (by 1523 – 1573), English politician
- Elizabeth Darrell (courtier) (c. 1513–c. 1556), English mistress and muse of Sir Thomas Wyatt
- Gary Darrell (born 1947), Bermudian football player and manager
- George Darrell (1851–1921), Australian playwright
- Gilbert Darrell (1923–2018), Bermuda politician and businessperson
- Guy Darrell (1944–2013), British singer and musician
- John Darrell (1562 – after 1602), Anglican clergyman of Puritan views
- Johnny Darrell (1940–1997), American country music singer-songwriter
- Johnny Darrell (director), Canadian television director and writer
- Laura Darrell, American actress and singer
- Margaret Darrell, American film editor of the 1920s
- Marmaduke Darrell (died 1632), English courtier and naval administrator
- Maudi Darrell (1882–1910), English actress
- Michael Darrell-Hicks (born 1997), American baseball pitcher
- Mick Darrell (born 1947), English footballer
- Norris Darrell (1899–1989), American attorney
- Peter Darrell (1929–1987), English ballet dancer and choreographer
- Sampson Darrell (1594–1635), English politician and naval administrator
- Seion Darrell (born 1986), Bermudian football player
- Steve Darrell (1904–1970), American actor
- Trevor Darrell, American computer scientist
- William Darrell of Littlecote (1539–1589), English Member of Parliament
- William Darrell (Jesuit) (1651–1721), English Jesuit theologian and writer

== See also ==
- Darell (surname)
