= Durel =

Origin
- Languages: French, Turkish
- Meaning: hard
- Region of origin: France and Turkey

Other names
- Variant forms: Durell, Durrell, Durelle, Duran, Dursun, Durmuş

Durel is a French last name, mainly found originally in Normandy and derived from the French adjective dur ("hard", "tough") + suffix -el. French variant forms include Dureau, Duret, Durelle and Durette. The Durel form was anglicized in Durell, Durrell. The English spelling -ell renders the French pronunciation of -el (see also : Brunell, Anketell, LeBell, Cotterell, etc.)

With another etymology – it can also be rarer found in Turkey, where it may be derived like the names Duran ("staying"), Durmuş ("stayed") and Dursun ("he may stay") from the Turkish verb durmak ("to stop", "to stand", "to stay", "to remain").

Notable people with the surname include:

- Joey Durel (born 1953), American businessman and former mayor of Lafayette, Louisiana
- John Durel (1625–1683), Jèrriais cleric
- Philippe Durel (born 1954), former French racing cyclist

== See also ==
- DJ Durel, American record producer and DJ
- Durel Avounou (born 1997), Congolese footballer
