= Darrell =

- Pronunciation: /ˈdærəl/ DARR-əl
- Gender: Male

Origin
- Origin: Norman-French
- Meaning: huckleberry

Other names
- Related names: Darryl, Daryl

Darrell is a given name derived from an English surname, which was derived from Norman-French d'Airelle, originally denoting one who came from Airelle in France. There are no longer any towns in France called Airelle, but airelle is the French word for huckleberry.

Darrell may refer to:

== Sports ==
- Darrell Allums (born 1958), American basketball player
- Darrell Armstrong (born 1968), NBA basketball player
- Darrell Basham (born 1949), American stock car racer
- Darrell Campbell (born 1981), American football defensive tackle on the practice squad of the Chicago Bears
- Darrell Clarke (born 1977), manager of Bristol Rovers football club
- Darrell Daniels (born 1994), American football player
- Darrell Evans (born 1947), former third baseman and first baseman in Major League Baseball
- Darrell Gill Jr. (born 2004), American football player
- Darrell Green (born 1960), cornerback for the Washington Redskins from 1983 to 2002
- Darrell Griffith (born 1958), former NBA basketball player who spent his entire career with the Utah Jazz
- Darrell Jackson (born 1978), American football wide receiver currently playing for the Seattle Seahawks of the National Football League
- Darrell Jackson Jr. (born 2003), American football player
- Darrell Johnson (1928–2004), Major League Baseball catcher and manager
- Darrell Henderson (born 1997), American football player
- Darrell Hogan (1926–2016), American football player
- Darrell Luter Jr. (born 2000), American football player
- Darrell May (born 1972), Major League Baseball pitcher for the Minnesota Twins
- Darrell Porter (1952–2002), Major League Baseball catcher
- Darrell Royal (1924–2012), College Football Hall of Fame member, and is the winningest football coach in University of Texas Longhorn history
- Darrell Russell (dragster driver) (1968–2004), NHRA drag racer
- Darrell Russell (American football) (1976–2005), two-time Pro Bowl defensive lineman for the Oakland Raid the NFL who died in a car crash
- Darrell Stewart Jr. (born 1996), American football player
- Darrell Taylor (born 1997), American football player
- Darrell Walker (born 1961), American professional basketball coach and retired player
- Darrell Wallace (Canadian football) (fl. 1980s–1990s), former Canadian Football League player
- Darrell Wallace Jr. (born 1993), NASCAR driver
- Darrell Waltrip (born 1947), NASCAR driver and commentator
- Darrell Williams (rugby league) (fl. 1980s–2010s), New Zealand rugby league footballer, coach and administrator
- Darrell Williams (basketball) (born 1989), American basketball player for Hapoel Tel Aviv of the Israeli Premier League
- Darrell Survey, an American golf equipment research company

== Arts and entertainment ==
- Darrell Abbott aka Dimebag Darrell (1966–2004), American heavy metal guitarist and songwriter
- Darrell Banks (1937–1970), American soul singer
- Darrell Eastlake (1942–2018), Australian radio and television presenter
- Darrell Evans (musician) (born 1968), American Christian musician and songwriter
- Darrell Hammond (born 1955), American actor and comedian
- Darrell Larson (born 1950), American actor
- Timothy Darrell Russ (born 1956), American actor
- Darrell Scott (born 1959), American country singer-songwriter
- Darrell Sheets (fl. 2010s–2020s), American auctioneer and cast member of Storage Wars
- Darrell Sweet (musician) (died 1999), Scottish hard rock drummer
- Darrell K. Sweet (1934–2011), American science fiction and fantasy illustrator
- Darrell Winfield (1929–2015), American rancher and model
- Darrell Zwerling (1928–2014), American actor

== Other fields ==
- Darrell Allahar, Trinidad and Tobago politician
- Darrell Blocker (fl. 1980s–2020s), nicknamed "The Spy Whisperer", CIA agent
- Darrell Brooks (born 1982), American mass killer
- Darrell Hickman (born 1935), justice of the Arkansas Supreme Court
- Darrell Issa (born 1953), American politician
- Darrell Long (fl. 1980s–2020s), American computer scientist
- Darrell Louis, American politician
- Darrell Keith Rich (1955–2000), Native American serial killer
- Darrell D. Wiles (1914–2001), judge of the United States Tax Court

== In fiction ==
- Darrell Cartrip, a character from Pixar's Cars franchise
- Darrell Rivers, the protagonist of Enid Blyton series Malory Towers

== With the surname ==
- Darrell (surname)

== See also ==
- Darrel
- Darel
- Darell
- Darroll
- Daryl
- Darryl
- Durrell
- Derrell
