= Darryl =

- Pronunciation: /ˈdærəl/ DARR-əl
- Gender: Unisex (male and female)

Darryl is a given name, a variant spelling of Darell. Variations of this name include: Daryl, Daryll, Darryll, and Darrel.

== People ==
=== Darryl ===
- Darryl Brown (West Indian cricketer) (born 1973)
- Darryl Brown (South African cricketer) (born 1983)
- Darryl Byrd (born 1960), American former football player
- Darryl Cunningham (born 1960), English cartoonist (see also Daryl Cunningham below)
- Darryl David (born 1971), a member of the Singapore Parliament
- Darryl Dawkins (1957–2015), American National Basketball Association player
- Darryl Dikarrna Brown, Australian didgeridoo master
- Darryl Drake (1956–2019), American football coach and player
- Darryl Fitzwater Bishop of the Missionary Diocese of All Saints in the Anglican Church in North America
- Darryl George (born 1993), Australian baseball player
- Darryl Hamilton (1964–2015), American Major League Baseball player
- Darryl Hardy (born 1968), American former National Football League player
- Darryl Henley (born 1966), American former National Football League player convicted of drug trafficking and attempted murder
- Darryl Hickman (born 1931), American actor and television executive
- Darryl Hill, multiple people
- D. L. Hughley (born 1963), American actor, political commentator, radio host, author and stand-up comedian
- Darryl Johnson (disambiguation), multiple people
- Darryl Jones (disambiguation), multiple people
- Darryl Kile (1968–2002), American Major League Baseball pitcher
- Darryl Kropp, Canadian politician
- Darryl Kurylo (born 1965), American voice actor
- Darryl Lewis (born 1961), American football player (see also Darryll Lewis below)
- Darryl McDaniels (born 1964), American musician, a founding member of the hip hop group Run–D.M.C.
- Darryl Monroe (born 1986), basketball player in the Israeli Basketball Premier League
- Darryl Morris (American football) (born 1990), American National Football League player
- Darryl Pearce (1960–2025), Australian basketball player
- Darryl Pinckney (born 1953), American novelist, playwright and essayist
- Darryl Sittler (born 1950), Canadian former National Hockey League player
- Darryl De Sousa (born 1964 or 1965), American police officer
- Darryl Stingley (1951–2007), American National Football League player who suffered a career-ending spinal cord injury
- Darryl Strawberry (born 1962), American former Major League Baseball outfielder
- Darryl Sutter (born 1958), Canadian former National Hockey League player and head coach
- Darryl Tapp (born 1984), American National Football League player
- Darryl Williams (disambiguation), several people
- Darryl Wren (born 1967), American former football player
- Darryl F. Zanuck (1902–1979), American film producer and studio executive

=== Daryl ===
- Daryl (magician) (1955–2017), American magician Daryl Easton
- Daryl Beattie (born 1970), Australian former Grand Prix motorcycle road racer
- Daryl Braithwaite (born 1949), Australian singer
- Daryl Cunningham (born 1960), former Australian rules footballer
- Daryl Cumber Dance (born 1938), American academic
- Daryl Myntia Daniels, American visual artist
- Daryl Dellora, Australian filmmaker
- Daryl Dragon (1942–2019), American musician and songwriter, co-founder of the music duo Captain & Tennille
- Daryl Gralka (born 1954), American professional tennis player
- Daryl Haggard, American-Canadian astronomer and associate professor
- Daryl Hall (born 1946), American singer, musician, songwriter and producer, co-founder of the music duo Hall & Oates
- Daryl Hannah (born 1960), American actress and environmental activist
- Daryl Hoole (born 1934), American author
- Daryl Janmaat (born 1989), Dutch footballer
- Daryl Johnston (born 1966), American National Football League commentator and former player
- Daryl Katz (born 1961), Canadian billionaire businessman and philanthropist
- Daryl Kerrigan, Irish-born American fashion-designer
- Daryl Koehn (born 1955), American philosopher
- Daryl Lindsay (1889–1976), Australian artist
- Daryl Macon (born 1995), American basketball player for Maccabi Tel Aviv of the Israeli Basketball Premier League
- Daryl Mack (1958–2006), American convicted murderer
- Daryl Mitchell, multiple people
- Daryl Morey (born 1972), American sports executive
- Daryl Murphy (born 1983), Irish footballer
- Daryl Ong (born 1987), Filipino singer
- Daryl Roth (born 1944), American theatre producer
- Daryl Sabara (born 1992), American actor
- Daryl Schmitt, American politician
- Daryl Janet Shandro, Canadian politician
- Daryl Somers (born 1951), Australian entertainer
- Daryl Joy Walters, American politician
- Daryl Watts (born 1999), Canadian ice hockey player
- Daryl Williams (disambiguation), several people

=== Daryll ===
- Daryll Clark (born 1986), football quarterback
- Daryll Cullinan (born 1967), former South African cricketer
- Daryll Hill (born 1982), American former basketball player
- Daryll Jones (born 1962), American former National Football League player
- Daryll Neita (born 1996), British sprinter
- Daryll Reddington (born 1972), New Zealand cricketer

=== Darryll ===
- Darryll Holland (born 1972), English jockey
- Darryll Lewis (born 1968), American former National Football League player

== Fictional characters ==
- Darryl, a Brawler in Brawl Stars
- Darryl, two brothers on the American television series Newhart
- Daryl, the main character in the 1985 science fiction movie D.A.R.Y.L.
- Daryl, a character in the movie 2021 American anthology horror movie Bad Candy
- Sheriff Daryl Blubs, a character in Gravity Falls
- Darryl Braxton, on the Australian soap opera Home and Away
- Daryl Coopersmith, a character in the 1987 American teen movie Adventures in Babysitting
- Darrel "Darry" Curtis, a character in the 1967 coming-of-age novel The Outsiders
- Daryl Dixon, on the American television series The Walking Dead
- Darryl MacPherson, a character from the comic strip and 2000–2002 TV series Baby Blues
- Darryl Jenks, a character in the 1988 American romantic comedy film Coming to America
- Darryl McGee, a character in The Ghost and Molly McGee
- Darryl Morris (Charmed), on the American television series Charmed
- Darryl Morton, on the British soap opera Coronation Street
- Darryl Philbin, on the American television series The Office
- Daryl Tanaka, a character in the 1994 American coming-of-age comedy-drama movie My Girl 2

== Other uses ==
- D.A.R.Y.L., a 1985 science fiction film
- Daryl, a controversial 2009 comedy skit by Dan Harmon

== See also ==
- Darla (disambiguation)
