= Durrell (disambiguation) =

Durrell is a surname.

Durrell may also refer to:

- Durrell, Newfoundland and Labrador, Canada
- Durrell Institute of Conservation and Ecology, a subdivision and research institute of the Department of Anthropology at the University of Kent
- Durrell Wildlife Conservation Trust, a conservation organisation
- Durrell Wildlife Park a wildlife park owned by Durrell Wildlife Conservation Trust

== See also ==
- Durell (disambiguation)
