= Darel =

Darel is a given name. Notable people with the name include:

- Darel Carrier (born 1940), former professional basketball player
- Darel Dieringer (1926–1989), former NASCAR Grand National and Winston Cup driver
- Darel Hancock, better known as Bomani Armah, American hip-hop poet
- Darel Hart (born 1964), former Australian rules footballer
- Darel McKinney, early 20th-century US marine
- Darel Russell (born 1980), English footballer, currently playing for Norwich City
- Darel Uy (born 1979), Filipino politician
- Dominique Darel (1950–1978), French model and actress, mainly active in Italian cinema
- Florence Darel (born 1968), French actress
- Sophie Darel (born 1944), French actress

== See also ==
- Darrel
- Darrell
- Darryl
