= Seion =

Seion may refer to:

- a seion (せいおん, 清音), a type of mora (phonologic syllable) in Japonic languages which is denoted by a Kana character without any dakuten or handakuten diacritic, and that is part of the standard Gojuon alphabet in Japanese (as opposed to a dakuon or handakuon), i.e. a syllable with a leading unvoiced consonant or leading semivowel, or, at large, a vowel without any leading consonant
- place names and chapel names in Wales, United Kingdom:
  - Seion Chapel, Cwmaman
- as a given name:
  - Seion Darrell, a Bermudian football player
