= Durmuş =

Durmuş is a Turkish surname and masculine given name. Notable people with the name include:

== Given name ==
- Durmuş Bayram (born 1986), Turkish footballer
- Durmus A. Demir (born 1967), Turkish theoretical physicist and professor of Physics
- Durmuş Yılmaz (born 1947), Turkish economist

== Surname ==
- Gamze Durmuş, Turkish football referee
- İlkay Durmuş (born 1994), Turkish footballer
- Muhammed Enes Durmuş (born 1997), Turkish footballer
- Naşide Gözde Durmuş (born 1985), Turkish scientist and geneticist
- Osman Durmuş (1947–2020), Turkish physician and politician

== See also ==
- Durmuşlu, town in Şırnak Province, Turkey
