= Durelle =

Durelle or DuRelle may refer to:

- George DuRelle (1852–1926), American lawyer and judge
- Yvon Durelle (1929–2007), Canadian boxer
- Durelle Alexander (1918–1994), American actor

== See also ==
- Durell (disambiguation)
- Durel, a surname
- Durrell, a surname
