= Darroll =

Darroll is a masculine given name and may refer to:

- Darroll DeLaPorte (1903–1980), American football player
- Darroll Powe (born 1985), Canadian ice hockey player
- Darroll Wilson (born 1966), American former boxer

== See also ==
- Darell
- Darrell
- Darryl
- Durrell
