= Victualling Commissioners =

Division of the British Royal Navy

Victualling Board
- Emblem of the Victualling Board, as seen across its Yards and Depots.

Agency overview
- Formed: (1683–1832)
- Preceding agency: Office of the Surveyor of Marine Victuals
- Superseding agency: Victualling Department
- Jurisdiction: Kingdom of England; Kingdom of Great Britain; United Kingdom
- Headquarters: London
- Agency executive: Commissioners for the Victualling of the Navy
- Parent agency: Admiralty

The Commissioners for the Victualling of the Navy, often called the Victualling Commissioners or Victualling Board, was the body responsible under the Navy Board for victualling ships of the British Royal Navy. It oversaw the vast operation of providing naval personnel (140,000 men in 1810) with enough food, drink and supplies to keep them fighting fit, sometimes for months at a time, in whatever part of the globe they might be stationed. It existed from 1683 until 1832 when its function was first replaced by the Department of the Comptroller of Victualling and Transport Services until 1869 then that office was also abolished and replaced by the Victualling Department.

== History ==
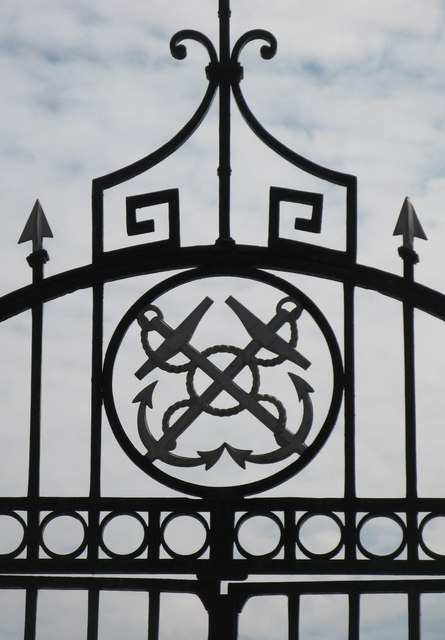
Ornamental gates to the steps down to the Thames, Deptford Strand, SE8 - geograph.org.uk - 1492404 Original emblem of the Victualling Commissioners above the river gate at Deptford (Royal Victoria Victualling Yard)

Under Elizabeth I, a General Surveyor of Victuals had been appointed in 1550 a principal officer of the Navy Board to oversee contracts for food and other provisions for the Navy. In 1550 he was listed as one of the seven members of the Board of Principal Officers and Commissioners of the Navy; he was required to 'take care always to have in store a stock of victuals to supply a thousand men at sea for one month at a fortnight's notice'. At first the Victualling Office was accommodated in the Tower of London, but it soon spread outside the precincts to the east (on to the site of the recently dissolved and demolished Abbey of St Mary Graces). The complex included storehouses, ovens, brewhouses and bakeries. (Milling took place across the river at Rotherhithe, and in 1650 a slaughterhouse was acquired in Deptford). Officials of the Victualling Board were to remain accommodated here until the nineteenth century; however, the constraints of the site (and difficult riverside access) led to the establishment of a new manufacturing facility at the Deptford site (the future Deptford Victualling Yard) in 1672.

By the mid-seventeenth century the established arrangement was for a single contractor to be engaged to make all necessary victualling provisions, with the Navy Board laying down strict criteria on the quality of the provisions it required. In the 1660s, Samuel Pepys, who was then Clerk of the Acts of the Navy, reformed the system of having a Purser assigned to each ship to oversee the distribution of supplies, and obliged each one to lodge a cash surety, and to keep complete accounts of every item issued. By the time of the Anglo-Dutch Wars, however, the system was breaking down (the government complaining that sufficient provisions had not been delivered, and the contractor complaining that payment had not been made). As a result of this, a salaried Board of Commissioners was established in 1683, and this body retained oversight of victualling for the next 150 years.

Though nominally under the direction of the Navy Board (which had its headquarters nearby on Tower Hill), the Victualling Board was effectively independent. The Victualling Board took over certain functions, including medical services, from the Transport Board on its dissolution in 1817. The Victualling Board itself was abolished in the Admiralty reforms of 1832, victualling then became the responsibility of the Comptroller of Victualling and Transports, who was superintended by the Fourth Sea Lord. In 1862 transport duties passed to a separate Transport Department and in 1869 the office of Comptroller of Victualling was abolished. His former duties were divided between the newly formed Contract and Purchase Department, under the Parliamentary and Financial Secretary, which became responsible for purchasing, management of the victualling stores facilities were under the control of the Superintendent of Victualling and the Victualling Department under the control of the Director of Victualling.

== Further activities ==
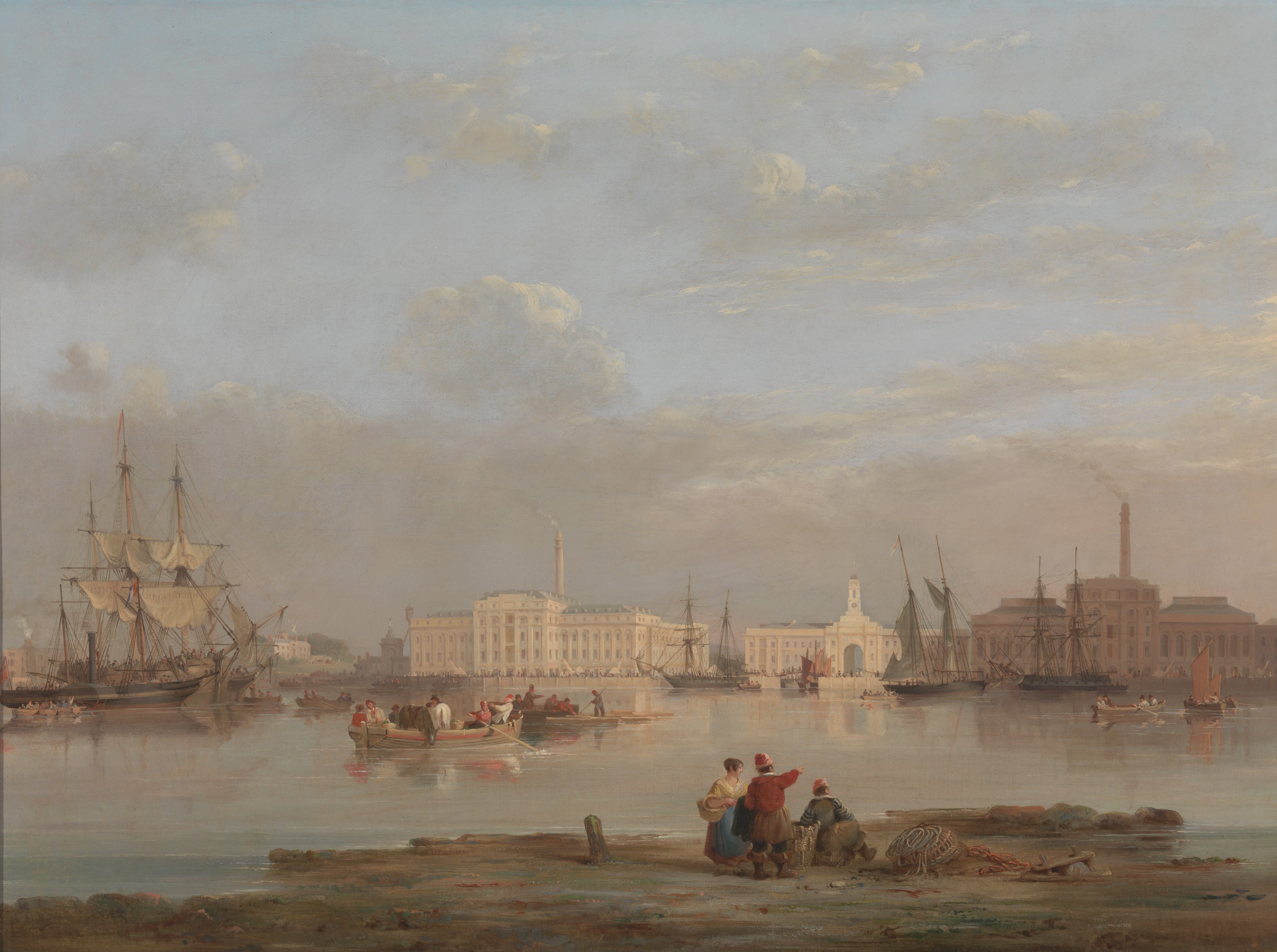
Activity at Plymouth's Victualling Yard, 1835

By 1739 the various Victualling Office facilities cost the state £16,241 to maintain, (Note: This equates to £317 million as a share of Gross Domestic Product in 2015 terms.) in addition to expenses for the purchase of victuals. In 1747, during the War of the Austrian Succession, this had risen to £30,393. (Note: This equates to £529 million as a share of Gross Domestic Product in 2015 terms.) In due course facilities were consolidated into Victualling Yards each with several processes and related storehouses accommodated on a single site. The Yards had deep-water wharves and were accessible (wind and weather permitting) from the major anchorages used by the Fleet. Under normal circumstances, ships due to set sail were expected to come to the nearest Yard to be loaded up with provisions. These would include preserved foodstuffs designed to last weeks or even months: ship's biscuit, salted beef, salted pork, pease, oatmeal, butter, cheese and beer. Most of these items were transported and stored in casks, which were themselves manufactured by the Board in large numbers at its on-site cooperages. In addition, the Victualling Yards provided fresh meat, bread and other items to ships stationed in port.

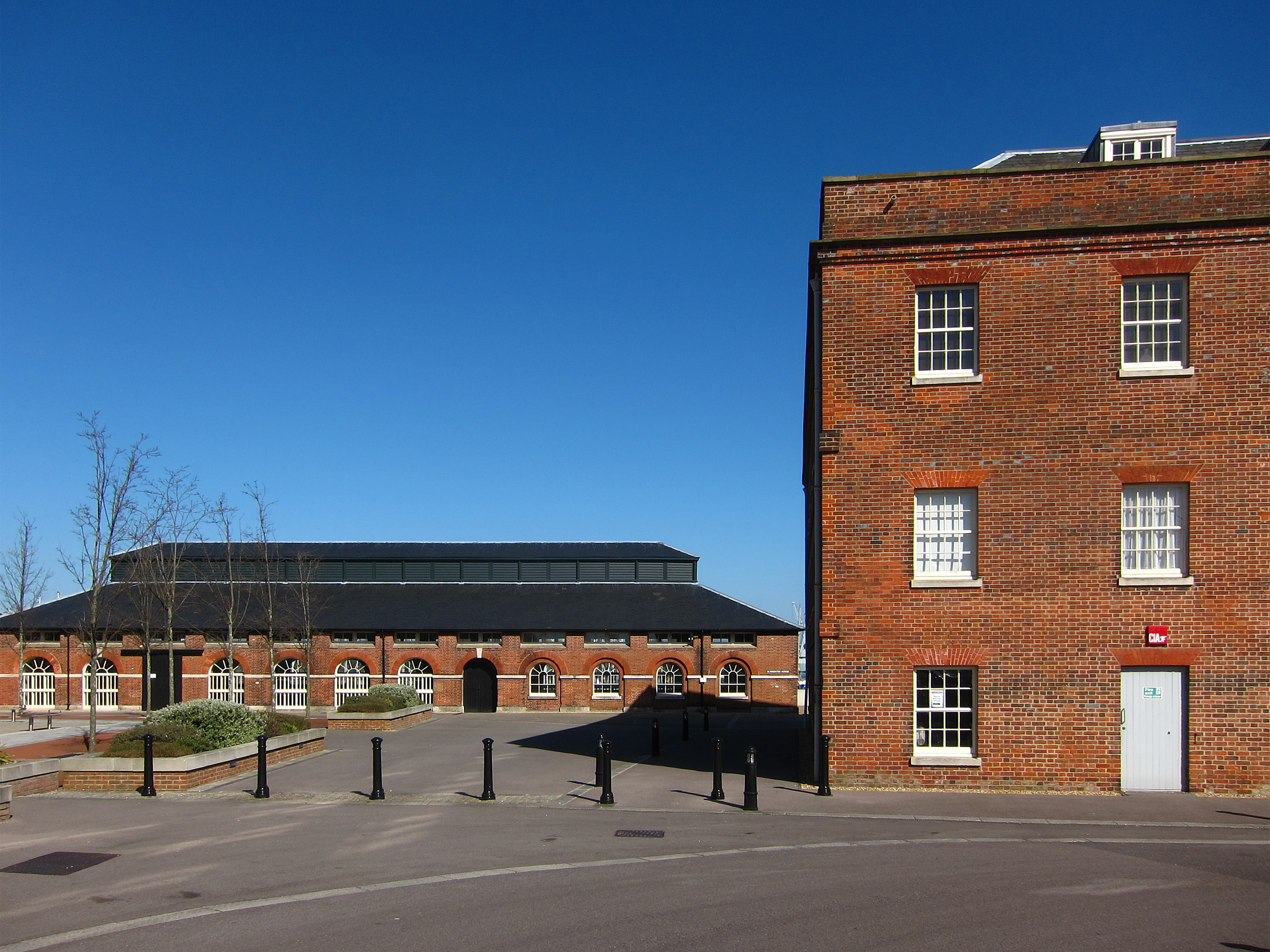
The former slaughterhouse (left) at Gosport's Royal Clarence Victualling Yard.

There was ongoing awareness of the need to stamp out corruption and improve quality. In 1658 the crew of Maidstone pulled down part of the Victualling Office at Rochester in protest at the foul quality of the food. Their captain Thomas Penrose sent up twelve men that were on shore at the time saying that although they were good men, the victualler had said "the more they complained [about the food], the worse their victuals should be". The reason so much of the manufacturing process took place in-house was to guarantee a level of quality. It was far easier to gauge the quality of raw materials than it would have been to evaluate finished product bought in from other providers (some of whom were not so scrupulous). Therefore, the Commissioners oversaw not only supply, but manufacture: of beer from hops, of flour from grain, of meat from livestock.

Though by no means perfect the system generally improved; if the food was of poor quality, at least there was plenty of it. Modern research has shown that the sailor's diet during the mid-eighteenth century contained nearly twice as many calories per day than was available to men on shore or in the British Army. The single largest contributor of calories was beer, of which the Victualling Board purchased sufficient quantity that each sailor could consume a ration of one gallon per day. Food – principally bread, pork, beef, peas and oatmeal – was provided by the Board as stores for up to six months at a time. By the late 1750s this diet was supplemented with portable soup. The quality of food was also slowly improved; by the period of the Napoleonic Wars only about 1% of supplies were actually condemned as unfit to eat.

== The Victualling Yards ==
=== Before 1815 ===
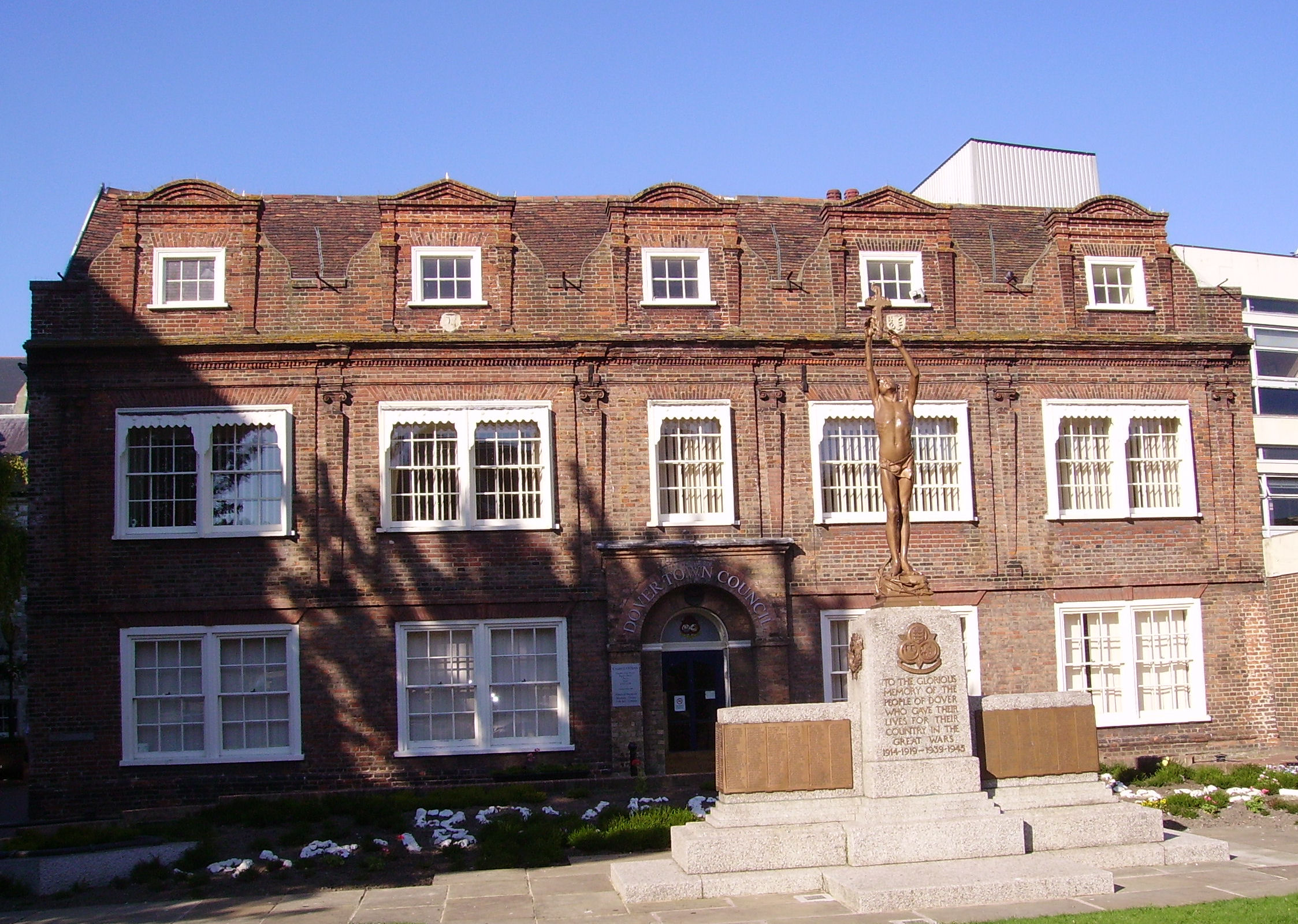
Maison Dieu House, built for the Agent Victualler of Dover in 1665.

By the early eighteenth century, Victualling Yards of various sizes had been established alongside several Royal Naval Dockyards in Britain, including Portsmouth, Plymouth, Deptford and Harwich (though the latter was closed, along with Harwich Dockyard, in 1713). There was also a Victualling Yard at Dover (which had no Dockyard, but was used to service ships in the nearby anchorage the Downs); the Maison Dieu served as Dover's victualling store from 1544 until 1831, when the Yard closed.

HM Victualling Yard, Deptford was the largest and busiest of the Victualling Yards (being advantageously close to the food wharves and markets of London). The other Naval Dockyards in the Thames area (Chatham, Sheerness and Woolwich) were all dependent on Deptford for victualling. (The Commissioners did maintain a small Yard at Chatham but little or no manufacturing took place here, it was more a storage depot). Deptford also directly supplied a Victualling Yard at Gibraltar (established in the eighteenth century).

In the first decade of the nineteenth century, the Commissioners established new minor Yards at Sheerness and at Deal (which, like Dover, provided for ships anchored in the Downs). In the following decade, a complex of naval and victualling storehouses was built on Haulbowline Island in Cork Harbour, Ireland (successor to an earlier depot at Kinsale). It was known as the Royal Alexandra Victualling Yard before being handed over to the Irish government in 1923.

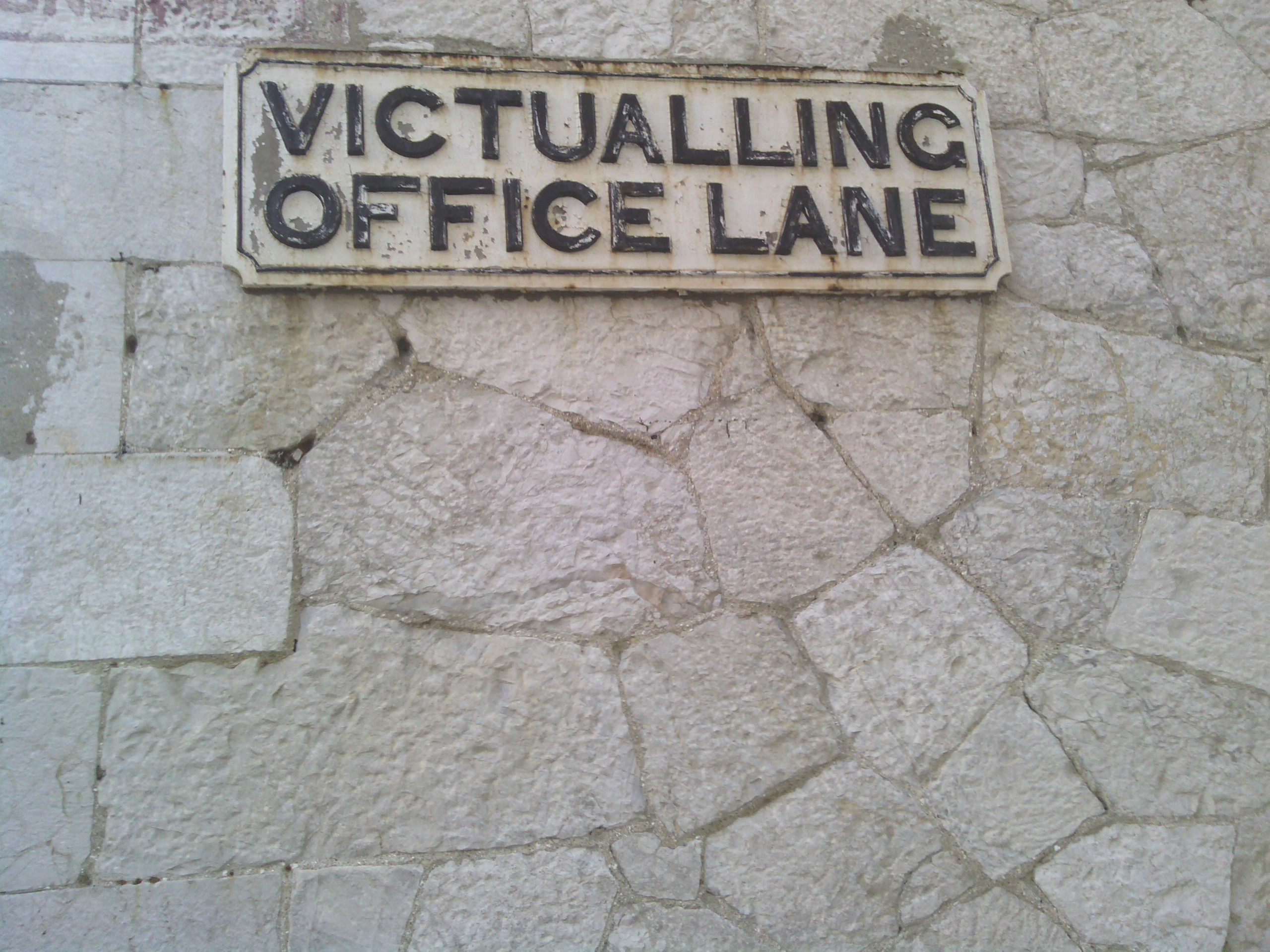
A street sign in Gibraltar

Overseas victualling was, where possible, arranged through contracts with local suppliers. In some places these were overseen by a resident Agent appointed by the Victualling Commissioners (though in more out-of-the-way locations ships' captains were expected to make their own arrangements). In the 17th century there were Agent Victuallers in Leghorn and Tangiers, as well as at a range of ports at home; by 1810 they were in such diverse locations as Malta, Rio de Janeiro, the Cape and Heligoland. For maximum flexibility, any necessary buildings were for the most part rented, rather than purpose-built; (although, in the 18th century, Yards were established on Jamaica and Antigua, these did not prove durable). On Gibraltar, however, a Victualling Yard was built in 1799 (following the loss of a rented property), and remained in operation until the 1980s.

=== 1815–1900 ===
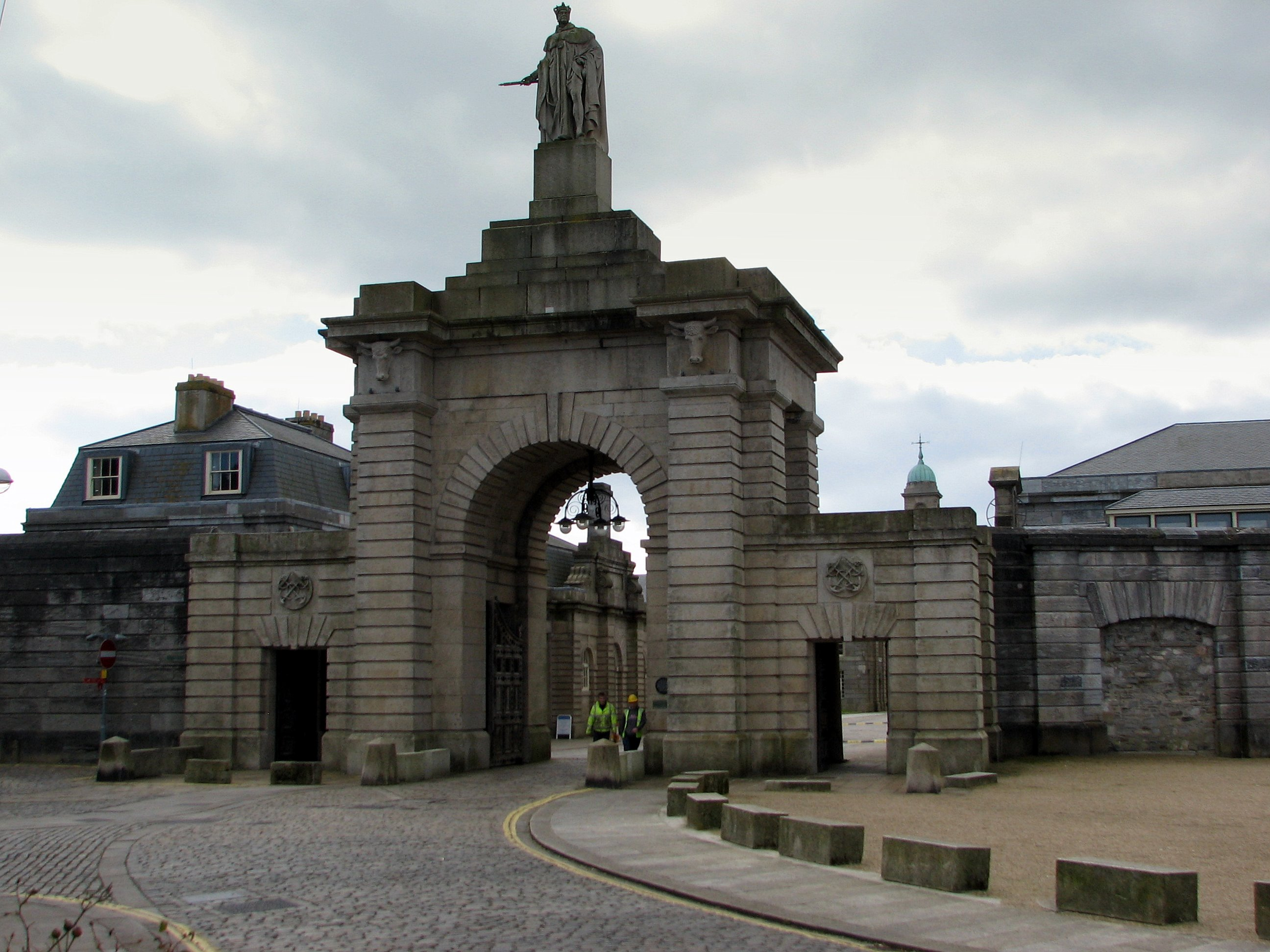
Gateway to the Royal William Victualling Yard

The Victualling Yards in Britain had for the most part developed haphazardly over time. In 1822, however, the Victualling Board decided to rationalise its Plymouth operation in a new, centralised site at Stonehouse which was named the Royal William Victualling Yard. It consisted of a central Grand Storehouse, flanked by two sizeable manufactories alongside the waterfront: a mill/bakery on one side, a brewery on the other (providing biscuits and beer respectively). The other buildings on site include cooperages (for manufacturing barrels), officers' residences and an elegant Slaughterhouse (for provision of salted beef), all in matching limestone and arranged on a symmetrical grid layout.

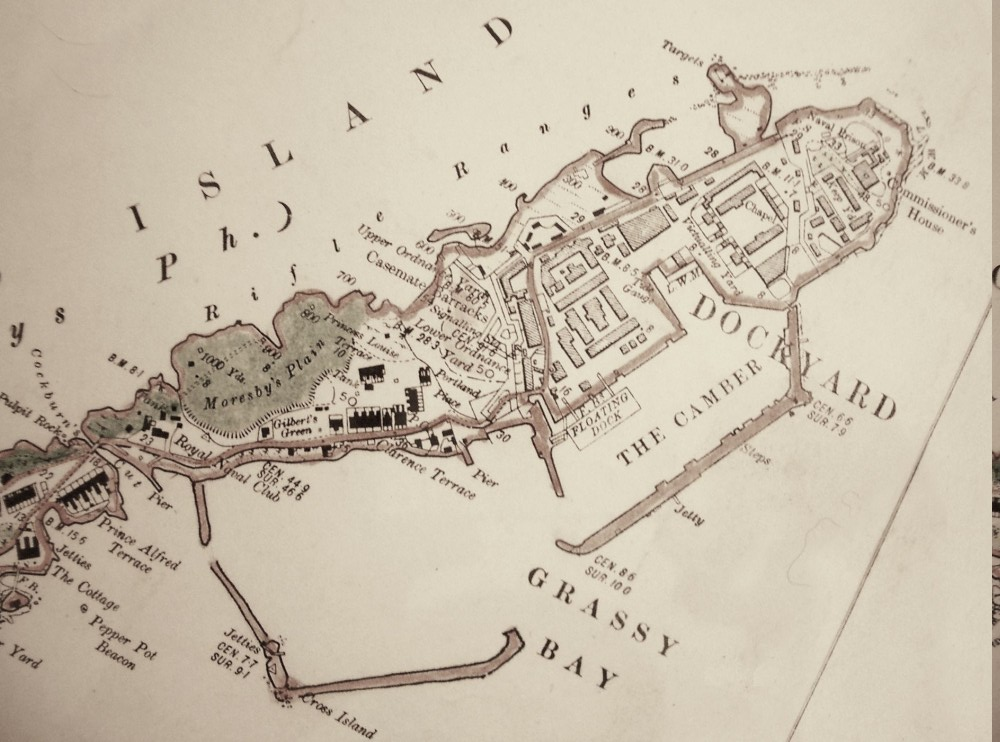
HMD Bermuda circa 1899, with the new South Yard under construction (left) and the old fortified North Yard (right) with its Victualling Yard

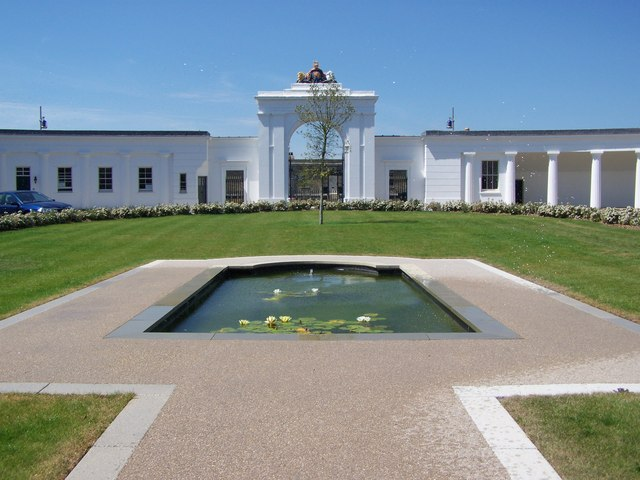
Gatehouse, viewed from inside the former Royal Clarence Yard in Gosport

A similar approach was taken with regard to Portsmouth: there, the new Royal Clarence Victualling Yard was begun in 1827 (on a site in Gosport known as the Weevil yard, where the Commissioners already owned a brewery and cooperage established in the early eighteenth century). Here the layout was less regimented, as the old cooperage was incorporated into the new complex; but it still presented an impressive frontage to the dockside (the symmetry of which has recently been restored through the rebuilding of a wing to the Granary, which had been demolished after the war). Royal Clarence was one of the first large industrial food processing plants in the country. Here, as at Royal William, many key buildings have survived in situ (though for the most part their function changed over decades of use): in addition to the 18th-century cooperage yard with its pump house, there is the monumental granary and bakery complex, a detached slaughterhouse, remains of the brewery storehouse (which also dates from the 18th century), a self-contained workshop complex, and officers' houses flanking the gateway arch. There is also an unusual building designed for storing and maintaining up to 3,000 cast iron ships' water tanks; a nearby reservoir (which also powered hydraulic machinery in the yard) was used to replenish HM Ships with fresh water.

Both the 'William' and the 'Clarence' yards were named after the future King William IV, who had taken an active interest in developments. Each was designed to maximize efficient storage, manufacture and seafront delivery of provisions, whilst also presenting a strikingly monumental symmetrical frontage to the sea. The Royal William Yard, in particular, has been described as "a unique concept in English industrial history: as a planned state manufacturing complex, on such a lavish scale, it is without comparison".

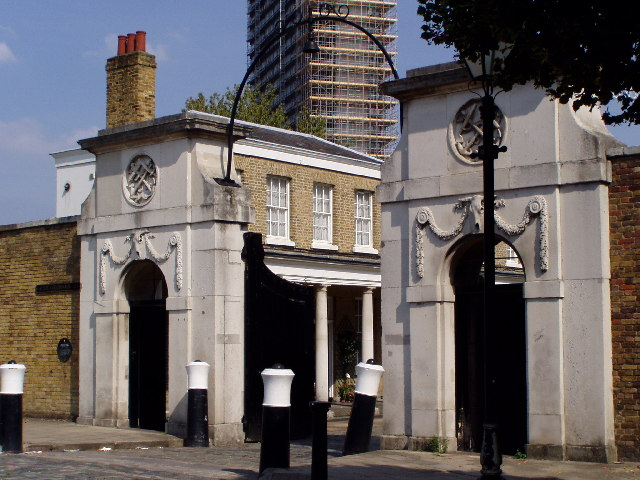
Entrance gate to Deptford's Yard

Deptford's Yard was not comprehensively rebuilt in this way, but it did continue to grow, even after the adjacent Dockyard had closed. (At its greatest extent, the site covered 35 acres.) During the 19th century, Deptford in particular began to stock or manufacture more specialised foodstuffs, in addition to the more traditional fare: there were cocoa, pepper and mustard mills on the site, along with storehouses for tea, sugar, rice, raisins and wine, as well as tobacco. In 1858, Deptford was renamed the Royal Victoria Victualling Yard.

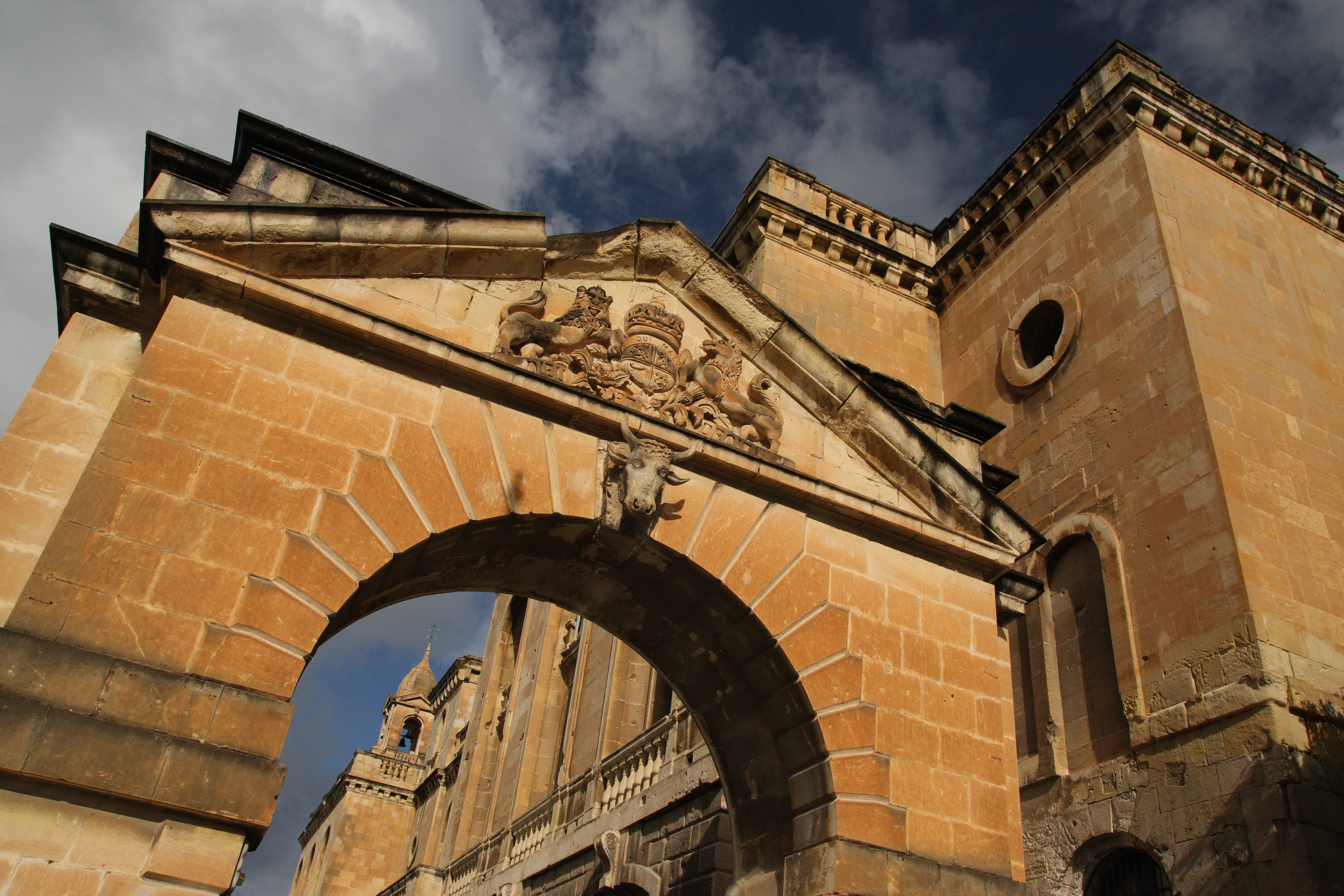
Gateway to the former Victualling Yard in Vittoriosa, Malta

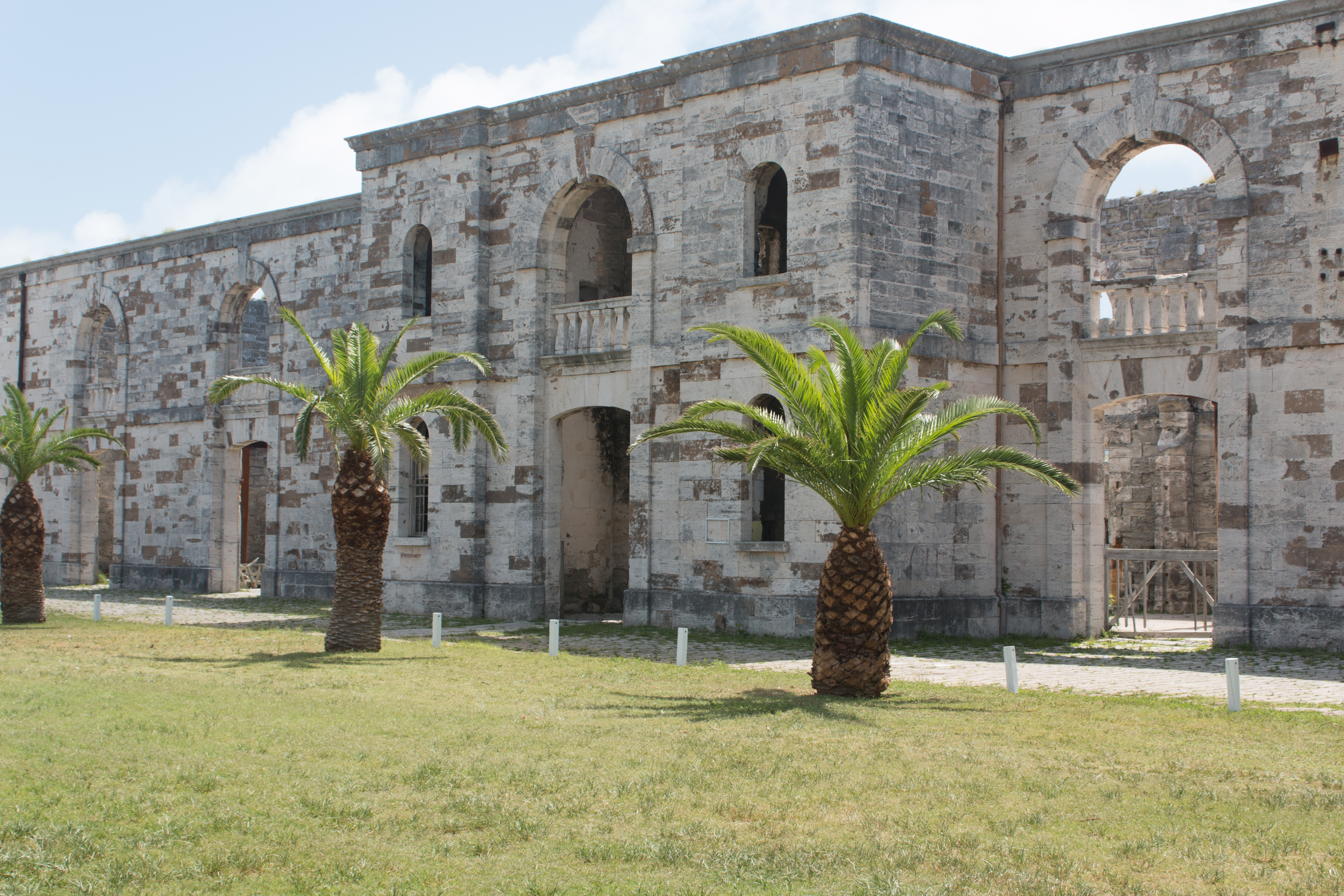
One of a pair of former Victualling Storehouses on Bermuda

Overseas, Yards and Storehouses continued to be established at different times when or where circumstances required; for example, at Georgetown on the remote settlement of Ascension Island a victualling storehouse was in place by 1827, later to be joined by a bakery (a rare instance of manufacturing in an overseas Yard) and a set of tanks for collecting and storing fresh water. In 1845, a Victualling Yard was built at Malta Dockyard; the Malta Maritime Museum is housed in one of its former buildings (the mill/bakery – of a monumental character similar to that of the Royal William Yard in Plymouth). At around the same time, work was beginning on the dockyard complex in Bermuda. Here, a spacious victualling yard was laid out between the dockyard proper and the fortified ordnance yard; still standing today, it consists of two long storehouses facing each other across an open quadrangle, the other two sides being formed by a cooperage and a row of officers' houses. The yard was eventually completed in around 1860.

=== 1900–present ===
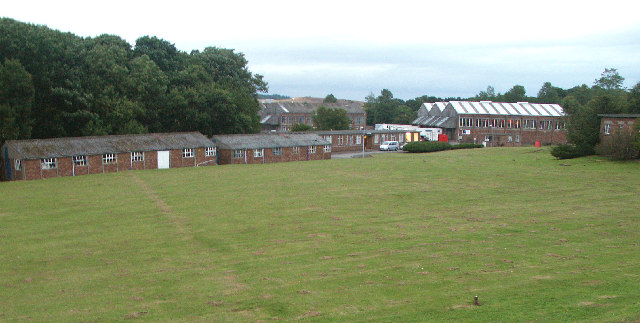
Utilitarian buildings of the former Royal Elizabeth Yard in Scotland

New Victualling Yards were still being established in the early 20th century, both at home (e.g. the Royal Elizabeth Yard, Dalmeny: a minor yard built to serve the new Dockyard at Rosyth) and abroad (e.g. the Royal Edward Yard, Darling Island, Sydney Harbour, Australia: built by the Government of New South Wales). Indeed, provisioning methods remained substantially unchanged until more widespread use of tinned foods, and then refrigeration, were adopted later in the century. At Gosport, the cooperage remained operational until 1970, when its work ceased along with the rum ration.

Deptford's Royal Victoria yard remained open until 1961, after which a housing estate was built on the site (though some buildings/features were retained and converted for community use). The South Coast yards – the Royal Clarence and the Royal William – both closed in 1992; since then, both sites have been sold to the private sector and their buildings (most of which are listed) have been converted to residential, office and leisure uses.

== Administration and structure of the Board ==
On the Board, each Commissioner had responsibility for a key area of victualling activity: the Brewhouse department, the Cutting House department, the Dry Goods department, Cooperage, Hoytaking and Stores. There were seven Commissioners; the aforementioned six, plus the Chairman (who had direct oversight of the Cash department). The Victualling Board proceeded to build breweries, slaughterhouses, mills and bakeries near to the Royal Navy Dockyards to provide beer, salted meat, ship's biscuits and other supplies under its own quality control. In 1725, the Victualling Commissioners, the Navy Board, the Sick and Hurt Commissioners and the Navy Pay Office all of which were components of the Navy Office moved into new accommodation in Somerset House.

=== Principal Officers and Commissioners of the Victualling Board ===
Included:

Comptroller of Victualling and Chairman of the Victualling Board

- 1803–1808: Captain, John Marsh
- 1808–1821: Captain, Thomas Welsh
- 1821–1822: Captain, John Clarke Searle
- 1822–1832: Hon. Granville Anson Chetwynd Stapylton

Deputy Chairman of the Victualling Board

- 1803–1822: Captain, George Philips Towry
- 1822–1823: Captain, Hon. Courtenay Boyle
- 1823–1832: John Wolley

Additional Comptrollers of the Victualling Board

- Comptroller of the Brew House
- Comptroller of the Cutting House
- Comptroller of Dry Goods
- Comptroller of Copperage
- Comptroller of Hoytaking
- Comptroller of Victualling Stores

Victualling Commissioners Included:

- 1683–1690: Nicholas Fenn
- 1683–1690: Sir Richard Haddock
- 1683–1690: John Parsons
- 1683–1690: Anthony Sturt
- 1690–1693: James How
- 1690–1699: John Agar
- 1690–1699: Humphrey Ayles
- 1690–1702: Thomas Papillon
- 1690–1702: Simon Mayne
- 1693–1695: Israel Fielding
- 1695–1702: John Burrington
- 1699–1711: Thomas Colby
- 1699–1711: Henry Vincent
- 1702: Sir John Houblon Kt.
- 1702: William Carpenter
- 1702–1703: William Wright
- 1702–1704: John James
- 1702–1706: Abraham Tilghman
- 1703–1705: Thomas Jennings
- 1704–1706: Samuel Hunter
- 1704–1706: Henry Lee
- 1704–1714: Kenrick Edisbury
- 1705–1711: Thomas Harlow
- 1706–1711: Denzil Onslow
- 1706–1711: Thomas Reynolds
- 1706–1725: Thomas Bere
- 1711–1714: Henry Lee
- 1711–1714: Sir Francis Marsham 3rd Bart
- 1711–1718: Henry Vincent
- 1711–1721: Samuel Hunter
- 1712–1714: William Stephens
- 1714–1717: Waller Bacon
- 1714–1719: Robert Arris
- 1714–1721: Denzil Onslow
- 1714–1721: Thomas Reynolds
- 1714–1723: Peter Jeyes
- 1717–1720: Owen Buckingham
- 1718–1720: Edward Eliot
- 1719–1728: William Passenger
- 1720–1721: Joshua Churchill
- 1720–1727: Henry Cartwright
- 1721–1722: Hugh Cholmley
- 1721–1727: Sir George Saunders Kt.
- 1721–1734: William Fisher
- 1722–1727: Stephen Bisse
- 1725–1729: George Huxley
- 1725–1733: Edward Trelawny
- 1727–1728: Sprig Manesty
- 1727–1739: Henry Parsons
- 1728–1734: John Berkeley
- 1728–1747: Thomas Revell
- 1729–1744: William Thompson
- 1729–1747: Thomas Brereton
- 1733–1738: George Crowle
- 1734–1742: Francis Eyles (later Eyles Stiles)
- 1734–1746: Stephen Bisse
- 1738–1748: William Hay
- 1741–1744: Thomas Trefusis
- 1742–1752: Richard Hall
- 1742–1755: Thomas Cooper
- 1744–1748: William Davies
- 1745–1746: Arthur Stert
- 1746–1747: John Russell
- 1746–1778: James Wallace
- 1747–1760: William Jenkins
- 1747–1761: Francis Vernon
- 1747–1762: Sir Francis Haskins Eyles-Stiles, 3rd Bart
- 1747–1765: Hon. Horatio Townshend
- 1748–1752: Tyrwhitt Cayley
- 1752: Thomas Winterbottom
- 1752–1780: Sir Roger Burgoyne (Bart)
- 1755–1776: Robert Pett
- 1760–1763: Robert Rule
- 1761–1768: Tyringham Stephens
- 1762–1784: Jonas Hanway
- 1763–1772: George Marsh
- 1765–1767: James Fortrey
- 1767–1794: Alexander Chorley
- 1768–1780: Thomas Colby
- 1772–1776: William Gordon
- 1776–1778: Henry Pelham
- 1776–1785: Joah Bates
- 1778–1787: James Kirke
- 1778–1789: John Slade
- 1781–1786: Montagu Burgoyne
- 1781–1790: William Lance
- 1784–1803: George Phillips Towry
- 1785–1799: George Cherry
- 1785–1811: William Boscawen
- 1787–1793: Samuel Marshall
- 1789–1790: William Bellingham
- 1790–1798: Joseph Hunt
- 1790–1805: Francis Stephens
- 1793–1796: Francis John Hartwell
- 1794–1809: Sadleir Mood
- 1796–1803: John Rodney
- 1798–1803: John Marsh
- 1799–1807: John Harrison
- 1803–1806: Rear-Admiral, Charles Cunningham
- 1805–1808: William Budge
- 1807–1822: Thomas Welsh
- 1808–1822: John Aubin
- 1808–1831: Nicholas Brown
- 1809–1813: Hon. Edward Richard Stewart
- 1811–1832: Frederick Edgcumbe
- 1813–1825: Robert William Hay
- 1817–1831: John Weir
- 1821–1827: Richard Creyke
- 1821–1832: Henry Garrett
- 1822–1832: Sir William Burnett Kt. (ktd. 25 May 1831)
- 1825–1829: Hon. William Lennox Bathurst
- 1827–1832: Captain, Sir James Alexander Gordon Kt.
- 1827–1832: Captain, John Hill
- 1831–1832: John Thomas Briggs
- 1839–1832: James Meek.

== Timeline ==
Note: Below is a timeline of responsibility for victualling for the Royal Navy.

- Navy Board, Surveyor of Marine Victuals, 1550–1679
- Navy Board, Victualling Board (Board of Victualling Commissioners), 1683–1832
- Board of Admiralty, Comptroller of Victualling and Transport Services, 1832–1862
- Board of Admiralty, Comptroller of Victualling, 1862–1870
- Board of Admiralty, Contract and Purchase Department, 1869–1964
- Board of Admiralty, Superintendent of Victualling, 1870–1878
- Board of Admiralty, Director of Victualling, 1878–1964

== See also ==
- Sir William Bellingham, 1st Baronet

== Attribution ==
- National Archives. (1660–1975). Records of Victualling Departments. ADM Division 9. http://discovery.nationalarchives.gov.uk/details/r/C708/Records of Victualling Departments
