= Edward Baeshe =

English politician

Edward Baeshe or Bashe (1506 or 1507 – 1587) was an English naval administrator and politician.

He was born the son of Richard Baeshe of Worcester.

He worked under Thomas Cromwell, and in 1550 became General Surveyor of Victuals for the navy. He was the Member of Parliament for Rochester during the reign of Queen Mary and Elizabeth (elected Nov 1554, 1559 and 1563), and for Preston in 1571. He was Sheriff of Hertfordshire for 1571 and 1584.

In 1565 the queen's goldsmith Affabel Partridge sued Edward Baeshe, then of West Coker, for the value of a garter set with rubies and pearls. Baeshe had paid for a gold flower set with diamonds and pearls.

He married twice: firstly Thomasin Baker (no children) and secondly Jane, the daughter of Sir Ralph Sadler of Hackney, with whom he had two sons.
