= Durell =

Durell may refer to:

== Persons ==
- Birgitta Durell (1619–1683), Swedish industrialist
- C. V. Durell (1882–1968), schoolmaster who wrote mathematical textbooks.
- Daniel Meserve Durell (1769–1841), U.S. Representative from New Hampshire
- Durell Peaden, a Republican member of the Florida Senate, representing the 2nd District since 2001.
- Durell Taylor, American football player
- Edward Durell Stone (1902–1978), American modernist twentieth century architect.
- Edward Henry Durell, the 25th mayor of New Orleans (1863).

== Other ==
- Durell Software UK producer of Accounting software, previously well known for ZX Spectrum games.

== See also ==
- Durel (surname)
- Durelle (disambiguation)
- Durrell
