= John Thomas Briggs =

Sir John Thomas Briggs (4 June 1781 – 3 February 1865) was an English civil servant who was accountant-general of the Royal Navy.

He came from an old Norfolk family, a direct descendant of Dr. William Briggs, and, in a collateral line related to Professor Henry Briggs, was born in London on 4 June 1781.

He entered into the civil service of the Admiralty in 1796. At the age of 25, he was appointed secretary to the commission for "revising and digesting" the Royal Navy's civil affairs, under the presidency of Lord Barham, in which capacity he was the virtual author of the voluminous reports issued by the commission from 1806 to 1809. Briggs was then appointed assistant-secretary of the victualling board, a post which he held till, in 1830, he was selected by Sir James Graham, then first lord of the admiralty, as his private secretary; but was shortly afterwards advanced to be commissioner and accountant-general of the victualling board. That board was abolished in 1832, and Briggs was appointed accountant-general of the navy. He held this office for the next 22 years, during which term many and important improvements were made in the system of accounts, in the framing of the naval estimates, in the method of paying the seamen, and, more especially, in enabling them to remit part of their pay to their wives and families.

On 26 February 1851, Briggs received the honour of knighthood in acknowledgement of his long and efficient departmental service, from which he retired in February 1854. In Briggs's entry in the Oxford Dictionary of National Biography, naval historian Andrew Lambert remarked that Briggs "made a major, sustained contribution to the modernization of naval administration between 1809 and 1854" and noted that "he published several pamphlets on naval administration."

He died at his home, 4 Royal Crescent, Brighton on 3 February 1865. His wife, to whom he was married in 1807, survived him several years, and died at the age of ninety, on 24 December 1873.

His son, Sir John Henry Briggs, chief clerk at the admiralty, was knighted on his retirement in 1870, after a service of forty-two years.
