= Darrell Hill =

Darrell Hill may refer to:

- Darrell Hill (American football) (born 1979), American football wide receiver
- Darrell Hill (shot putter) (born 1993), American track and field shot putter

== See also ==
- Darryl Hill (disambiguation)
