= Surveyor of Marine Victuals =

Office of the Surveyor of Marine Victuals
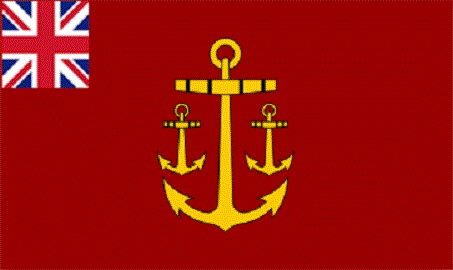
- Navy Board Flag
- Department of the Admiralty
- Member of: Navy Board (1550–1679)
- Reports to: Senior Commissioner Navy Board
- Nominator: Lord High Admiral of England
- Appointer: Lord High Admiral of England; Subject to formal approval by the King-in-Council
- Term length: Not fixed (usually for life)
- Inaugural holder: Edward Baeshe
- Formation: 1550–1679

The Surveyor of Marine Victuals later known as the General-Surveyor of Victuals was a civilian officer in the Royal Navy who was a former member of the Navy Board from 1550 until 1679, he was responsible for managing the supply of food, beverages and other provisions for the Royal Navy the office was replaced by the Victualling Board in 1683. The General-Surveyor was based at the Navy Office

== History ==
The post evolved from a much early official known as the Keeper of the Kings Storehouses the office was formally established in 1550 the post holder was also known as the Surveyor-General of Victuals who was a principal member of the Navy Board, with the exception of Edward Baeshe the first Surveyor of Navy Victuals until 1560 the office was always held jointly for life by two men if one died the surviving office holder would temporarily hold the post until a new appointee was announced. The Surveyor was head of the Marine Victuals Office within the Office of Admiralty and Marine Affairs and the victualling service of the Navy until 1679 when the office is abolished and replaced by a larger body known as the Victualling Board in 1683 run jointly by commissioners.

== Responsibilities ==
The Surveyor of Victuals was officially responsible for:

- Administration of the Victualling Stores, Chatham Dockyard
- Administration of the Victualling Stores, Deptford Dockyard
- Administration of the Victualling Stores, Erith Dockyard
- Administration of the Victualling Stores, Portsmouth Dockyard
- Administration of the Victualling Stores, Plymouth Dockyard
- Administration of the Victualling Stores, Woolwich Dockyard
- Supplying of all food and beverages to the Royal Navy, its crews and vessels

== List of surveyors of navy victuals ==
Included:

- Edward Baeshe, 18 June 1550 – 24 December 1560.
- Edward Baeshe and William Holstocke, 24 December 1560 – 29 October 1563, (jointly)
- Edward Baeshe and John Elyot, 30 October 1563 – 26 November 1582, (jointly).
- Edward Baeshe, sole survivor, to 26 Nov.1582.
- Edward Baeshe and James Quarles, 27 November 1582 – 2 May 1587, (jointly).
- James Quarles sole survivor, to 7 Nov.1595.
- Charles Quarles and Marmaduke Darrell, 8 November 1595 – 24 September 1599, (jointly).
- Marmaduke Darrell sole survivor, to 8 November 1595.
- Sir Marmaduke Darrell, and Thomas Bludder 24 July 1603 – 30 3 July 1603, (jointly).
- Sir Marmaduke Darrell, and Sir Thomas Bludder, Kt. 4 July 1604 – 30 January 1612, jointly).
- Sir Marmaduke Darrell, and Sir Allen Apsley, 31 January 1612 – 8 January 1623, (jointly).
- Sir Allen Apsley, and Sir Sampson Darrell, 8 January 1623 – 24 May 1630, (jointly).
- Sir Sampson Darrell, sole survivor, to 23 May 1635.

Post vacant till 27 November 1635

- John Crane, 28 November 1635 – 24 October 1660,
- Denis Alderman Gauden 24 October 1660 – 22 October 1667.
- Sir Denis Alderman Gauden, Kt, 23 October 1667 – 1677.
- John Godwin, 1677 – 10 February 1679. dies March 1688.

== Sources ==
- Surveyor of Marine Victuals 1550 – c. 1679. A provisional list compiled by J.C. Sainty, Institute of Historical Research, University of London, January 2003. British History Online http://www.history.ac.uk/publications/office/navymarine [accessed 26 March 2017].
