= Darrell Williams =

Darrell Williams may refer to:

== Sports ==
=== American football ===
- Darrel Williams (born 1995), American football running back
- Darrell Williams (American football) (born 1993), American football offensive tackle, currently a free agent
- Darrell Williams Jr. (born 1993), American football offensive tackle, for the Los Angeles Rams

=== Other sports ===
- Darrell Williams (basketball) (born 1989), American basketball player
- Darrel Williams (cricketer) (born 1995), English cricketer
- Darrell Williams (rugby league), New Zealand rugby league selector, player and coach

== Others ==
- Darrell K. Williams, United States Army general

== See also ==
- Darryl Williams (disambiguation)
- Daryl Williams (disambiguation)
