= Dureau =

Dureau is a surname. Notable people with the surname include:

- George Dureau (1930–2014), American artist
- Scott Dureau (born 1986), Australian rugby league player
