= Daryl Williams =

Daryl Williams may refer to:

- Daryl Williams (politician) (born 1942), Australian politician
- Daryl Williams (American football) (born 1992), American football offensive tackle
- Daryl Williams (rugby union) (born 1964), New Zealand-born Samoan rugby union player

== See also ==
- Darrel Williams (born 1995), American football running back
- Darryl Williams (disambiguation)
- Darrell Williams (disambiguation)
