= Daryl Myntia Daniels =

- Occupation: Visual artist
- Years active: 2013–present
- Website: https://www.dmyntiad.com/

"Butterflies," acrylic and oil on canvas, 2020

Daryl Myntia Daniels is an American visual artist from Cincinnati, Ohio who is known for her colorful paintings and murals. Her work often addresses themes of community, race, identity, and women's empowerment. Daniels has created murals on display in both Cincinnati and New York City. Additionally, she has exhibited work across the United States, including at the Cincinnati Art Museum, the Hole Gallery, and the Kente Royal Gallery in Harlem.

Daniels earned a Bachelor of Fine Arts in painting in 2013 from Ohio University, the first African American woman to do so. She then went on to study at the School of Visual Arts, from which she graduated with a Master of Fine Arts in 2016. In 2018, Daniels illustrated the children's book My Flipping Yaya, which was written by her mother and first gymnastics coach Yonce Daniels.
