= Durmus A. Demir =

Turkish theoretical physicist (1967–2024)

Durmuş Ali Demir
- Born: March 10, 1967 (age 59); Silifke, Turkey
- Died: 24 February 2024 (aged 56); Istanbul, Turkey
- Education: Middle East Technical University, University of Minnesota, University of Pennsylvania, Izmir Institute of Technology, ICTP, TPI, DESY
- Scientific career
- Fields: Physics
- Workplaces: Sabancı University
- Doctoral advisor: Namık Kemal Pak, Paul Langacker

Durmuş Ali Demir (March 10, 1967 – February 24, 2024) was a Turkish theoretical physicist. He worked at Sabancı University between 2019-2024. He was a dean of the Graduate School of Engineering and Sciences at the Izmir Institute of Technology where he was the ex-chair of the Physics Department. His research areas include supersymmetric standard model, extra dimensions and general relativity.

== Awards ==
- 2009 Full Member, TWAS
- 2006 The Humboldt Prize (Alexander von Humboldt Foundation Prize)
- 2005 TÜBITAK Young Scientist Prize
- 2004 TÜBA Young Scientist Prize
- 2001 TGC Sedat Simavi Science Award
- 1997 METU Parlar Foundation Encouragement Award

== Notable publications ==
- Demir DA, Everett LL, Langacker P (2008). "Dirac Neutrino Masses from Generalized Supersymmetry Breaking". Physical Review Letters. 100 (9) 091804. arXiv:0712.1341. Bibcode:2008PhRvL.100i1804D. doi:10.1103/PhysRevLett.100.091804. PMID 18352699.
- Demir DA, Masiero M, Vives O (1999). "Fully supersymmetric CP violation in K and B systems". Physical Review Letters. 82 (12): 2447–2450. arXiv:hep-ph/9812337. Bibcode:1999PhRvL..82.2447D. doi:10.1103/PhysRevLett.82.2447.
- Beyhan Puliçe; Reggie Pantig; Ali Övgün; Durmuş Demir (2023). "Constraints on charged symmergent black hole from shadow and lensing". Class. Quantum Grav. 40 (19): 195003. arXiv:2308.08415. Bibcode:2023CQGra..40s5003P. doi:10.1088/1361-6382/acf08c.
- Complete list at SPIRES
