= Darryl Johnson =

Darryl, Daryl or Darrell Johnson may refer to:

== Sports ==
- Darrell Johnson (1928–2004), American baseball player
- Daryl Johnson (1946–2023), American football defensive back
- Darrel Johnson (born 1959), college basketball coach
- Darryl Johnson (basketball) (born 1965), American basketball player
- Darryl Johnson (American football) (born 1997), American football defensive end

== Others ==
- Darryl N. Johnson (1938–2018), American politician
- Daryl Johnson (musician), American musician

== See also ==
- Daryl Johnston (born 1966), American football executive and former fullback
