= Darell (surname) =

Darell is a surname, and may refer to:

- Dai Darell (1952–2024), Swedish-American comic writer and novelist
- Edward Darell (1728–1814), English merchant and Governor of the Bank of England
- John Darell (died 1438), English Member of Parliament
- John Darell (died 1694) (1645–1694), English Member of Parliament
- Linnéa Darell (born 1945), Swedish politician
- Sir Lionel Darell, 1st Baronet (1742–1803) of the Darell baronets
- Sir Lionel Darell, 5th Baronet (1845–1919) of the Darell baronets
- Sir Lionel Darell, 6th Baronet (1876–1954) of the Darell baronets
- William Darell (clergyman) (died after 1580), English Anglican cleric and antiquarian
- William Darell (British Army officer) (1878–1954), British Army officer
- Sir William Darell, 4th Baronet (1817–1883), English cleric

== See also ==
- Darrell (surname)
