= Daryl Hoole =

American author and public speaker (1934–2026)

Daryl V. Hoole
- Born: Daryl Van Dam; March 5, 1934; Salt Lake City, Utah, U.S.
- Died: February 2, 2026 (aged 91); Salt Lake City, Utah, U.S.
- Occupations: Author, homemaker
- Writing career
- Genres: Homemaking, parenting, family living

Daryl Hoole (born Daryl Van Dam; March 5, 1934 – February 2, 2026) was an American author and public speaker. The main themes of her written works and speeches are home management and family living. She authored nine books and gave numerous lectures on these themes. Her bestselling book, The Art of Homemaking, remained in publication for 25 years.

== Life and career ==
Daryl Hoole was an author and lecturer on home management and family living. She authored nine published books and lectured on this topic extensively throughout the United States and Canada. Hoole's lecturing included speaking at Education Week, a conference held at Brigham Young University, for close to 40 years.

Earlier in her life, she served as a Latter-day Saint missionary in the Netherlands, where her father presided as mission president. Years later, she served with her husband Hendricus (Hank) when he was called as mission president of that same mission. She served a third mission when she and her husband were called as welfare-humanitarian administrators for The Church of Jesus Christ of Latter-day Saints in Asia. Based in Hong Kong, Hoole and her husband traveled, taught, and provided service throughout much of Asia for two years. Other significant service contributions for Hoole included her service on the Church's General Board of its Primary organization.

Hoole published her final book, The Art of Aging Joyfully, in her 90th year. She died on February 2, 2026, at the age of 91.

== Published works ==
- The Art of Teaching Children, 1964
- With Sugar ‘N Spice (with Donette V. Ockey), 1966
- The Art of Homemaking, 1967
- The Joys of Homemaking, 1975
- Our Own Society, 1979
- A House of Order, 1984
- The Ultimate Career: The Art of Homemaking Today, 2005
- Little Things That Can Make A Big Difference (CD), 2008
- The Art of Aging Joyfully, 2023

== Fans ==
Deseret Book reports that typical readers of Daryl Hoole’s publications are members of The Church of Jesus Christ of Latter-day Saints who place high importance on the value of home life and families; however, Daryl has followers in family-oriented people of diverse faiths and circumstances. Meridian Magazine asserts that, "Daryl Hoole is truly a master of the art of Homemaking."
