= Marmaduke Darrell =

English courtier

Marmaduke Darrell or Darrel or Dayrell (died 1632) was an English courtier, accountant, and naval administrator.

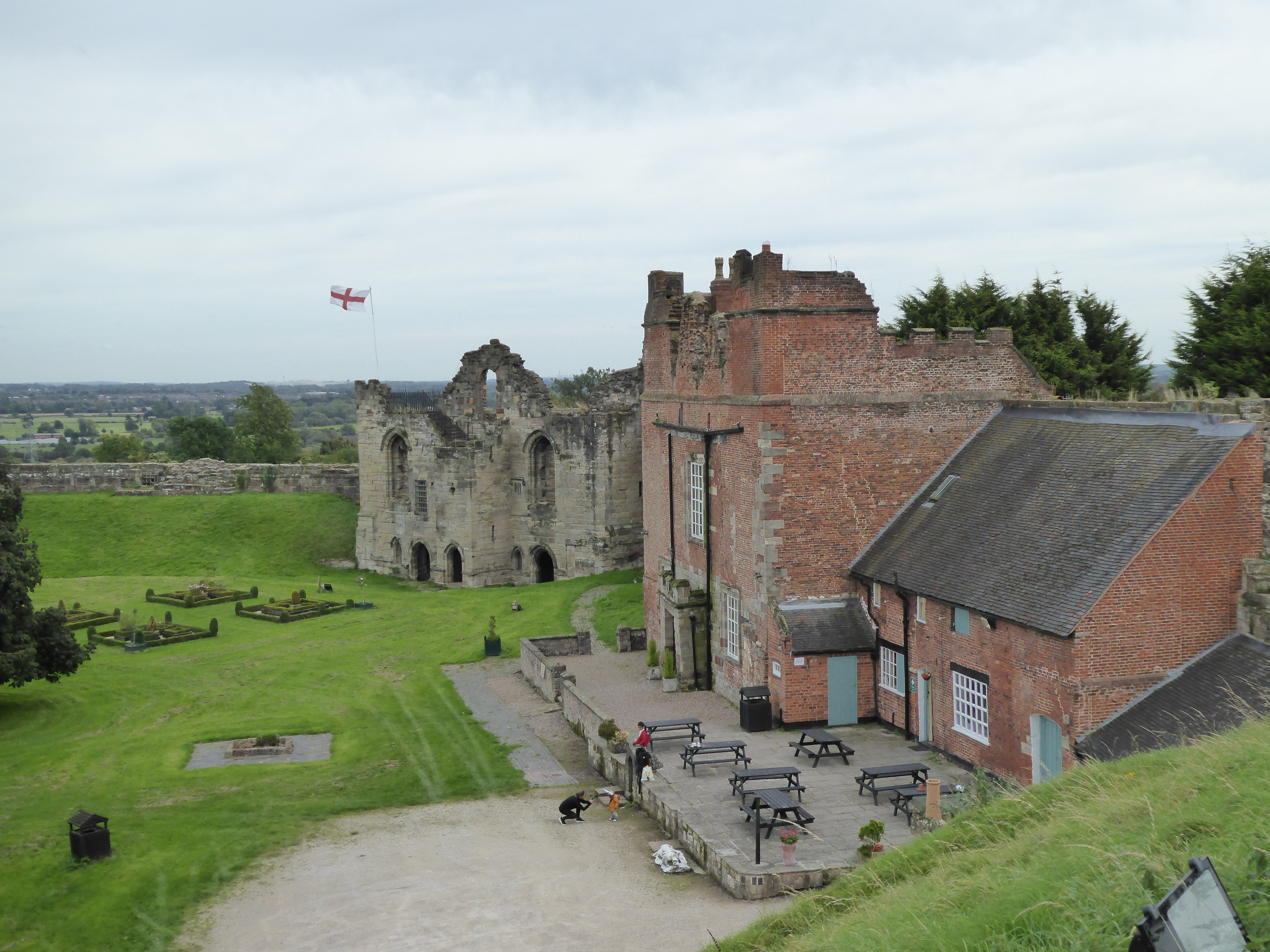
Marmaduke Darrell calculated the household expenses of Mary, Queen of Scots at Tutbury Castle

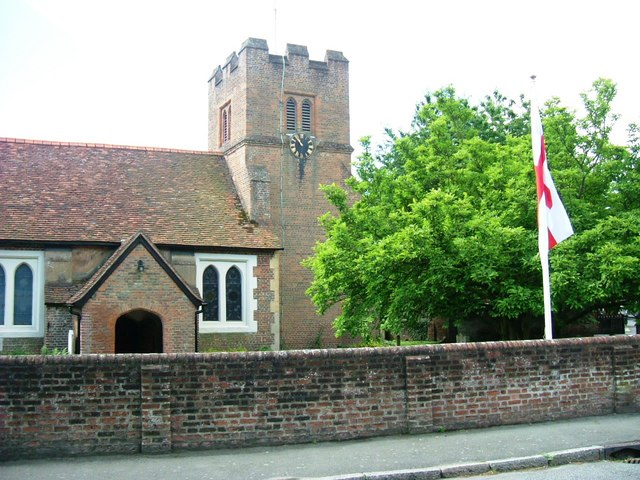
Marmaduke Darrell paid for the rebuilding of St James' at Fulmer in 1610

Darrell's estates were at Fulmer in Buckinghamshire.

He was a Clerk of the Avery to Elizabeth I. In April 1588, Darrell and Robert Vernon were described as clerk comptrollers to the household.

Darrell kept an account of the expenses of keeping Mary, Queen of Scots and her household at Tutbury Castle in 1585–6, totalling £3440-11s-8d. With Brian Cave, he set out a "diet" or budget for Mary, outlining the food required for her household and its cost. She needed an allowance of 12 pounds of sugar monthly for posset and caudle drinks taken in her chamber.

He attended Mary's execution at Fotheringhay Castle and wrote to a cousin, William Darrell at Littlecote, describing the event, "she her selfe endured it (as wee must all truely saye that were eye witnesses) with great courage, and shewe of magnanimitye".

His family kept an embroidered glove believed to have been Mary's gift to him. The leather glove embroidered with coloured silks and silver thread, lined with crimson satin, is preserved at Saffron Walden Museum.

He was the victualler of the ships or Surveyor of Marine Victuals from 1595 to 1623, and Cofferer of the Household .

In 1603, James VI of Scotland became King of England at the Union of the Crowns. Darrell was given funds of £2600 to organise the reception of his wife, Anne of Denmark, who came to England in June 1603, at Berwick-upon-Tweed. He was to convey a number of courtiers and a group of ladies in waiting to meet her at Berwick and pay some of expenses of her journey to London. The official party of gentlewomen chosen by the Privy Council consisted of two countesses, Frances Howard, Countess of Kildare, and Elizabeth, Countess of Worcester; two baronesses Philadelphia, Lady Scrope and Penelope, Lady Rich; and two ladies Anne Herbert, a daughter of Henry Herbert, 2nd Earl of Pembroke, and Audrey Walsingham. A Venetian diplomat, Giovanni Carlo Scaramelli, wrote that the six great ladies were escorted north by 200 horsemen.

He married Anne Lennard. Their children included Sampson Darrell (1594-1635), who was also Surveyor of Marine Victuals, and Mary Darrell, who married Robert Gorges of Wraxall, Somerset.

Marmaduke Darrell died in March 1631–2 and was buried at Fulmer in the church of St James, which he had rebuilt in 1610. There is a monument with effigies of him and his wife.
