= Dursun =

- Pronunciation: [duɾˈsun]
- Gender: Male

Origin
- Language: Turkish

Dursun is a masculine Turkish given name, it may refer to:

== Given name ==
- Dursun Karataş (1952–2008), Turkish communist
- Dursun Karatay (born 1984), Austrian footballer
- Dursun Sevinç (born 1972), Turkish weightlifter

== Surname ==
- Adem Dursun (born 1979), Turkish footballer
- Ahmet Dursun (born 1978), Turkish footballer
- Emine Dursun (born 2001), Turkish female darts player
- Furkan Dursun (born 2005), Austrian footballer
- İrem Dursun (born 2005), Turkishcross-country skier
- Özlem Ceren Dursun (born 2003), Turkish female cross-country skier
- Peter Dursun (born 1975), Danish former footballer
- Salih Dursun (born 1991), Turkish footballer
- Serdar Dursun (born 1991), Turkish footballer
- Turan Dursun (1934–1990), Turkish Islamic scholar
