= Gilbert Darrell =

Bermuda politician and businessman (1923–2018)

Member of the House of Assembly of Bermuda
- In office 1963–1968
- Constituency: Smith's South

Member of the Legislative Council of Bermuda
- In office 1972–1976

Member of the House of Assembly of Bermuda
- In office 1976–1993
- Constituency: Hamilton East

Personal details
- Born: 1923 Flatts Village, Bermuda
- Died: October 26, 2018 (aged 94–95) Smith's Parish, Bermuda
- Citizenship: Bermuda
- Party: National Liberal Party
- Spouse: Coralita Darrell
- Children: Gilbert Darrell, Miriam "Mimi" Smith

Gilbert Darrell (1923–2018) was a Bermuda politician and businessperson. He was a co-founder and former leader of the National Liberal Party.

He was first elected to the House of Assembly of Bermuda in 1963 as an independent.
