= Darryl Williams =

Darryl Williams may refer to:

- Darryl Williams (advocate) (born 1964), social justice and accessibility advocate
- Darryl Williams (center) (born 1997), American football player
- Darryl Williams (ice hockey) (born 1968), Canadian ice hockey player
- Darryl Williams (safety) (born 1970), American football player
- Darryl A. Williams (born 1961), United States Army general
- Darryl Tyree Williams, man who died in North Carolina

== See also ==
- Darrel Williams (born 1995), American football running back
- Daryl Williams (disambiguation)
- Darrell Williams (disambiguation)
