= Sampson Darrell =

Sir Sampson Darrell
- Born: 1594
- Died: 14 May 1635 (aged 40–41)
- Education: Queen's College, Oxford
- Occupations: Naval Administrator, MP
- Years active: 1623 to 1635
- Title: Surveyor of Marine Victuals
- Term: 1623 to 1635
- Predecessor: Sir Allen Apsley
- Successor: John Crane
- Board member of: Navy Board
- Father: Sir Marmaduke Darrell

Sir Sampson Darrell (1594 – 14 May 1635) was an English politician and Naval administrator who sat in the House of Commons from 1625 to 1626. He was Surveyor of Marine Victuals of the Royal Navy from 1623 to 1635.

== Biography ==
Darrell was the son of Sir Marmaduke Darrell of Fulmer, Buckinghamshire. He matriculated at Queen's College, Oxford on 8 May 1607, aged 13 and was awarded BA on 31 January 1610. He was a student of Gray's Inn in 1610. He was knighted on 13 June 1619. In 1625, he was elected Member of Parliament for Wendover. He was re-elected MP for Wendover in 1626. He held the post of victualler of the King's ships also known as Surveyor of Marine Victuals. a post his father also held from 1595 to 1623.

Darrell died in London at the age of about 39.

== Sources ==
- Surveyor of Marine Victuals 1550-c. 1679. A provisional list compiled by J.C. Sainty, Institute of Historical Research, University of London, January 2003. British History Online http://www.history.ac.uk/publications/office/navymarine [accessed 26 March 2017].

Parliament of England
| Preceded by John Hampden; Sir Alexander Unton | Member of Parliament for Wendover; 1625–1626; With: John Hampden | Succeeded by Ralph Hawtree; John Hampden |
