= Darrel R. Miller =

American politician (1929–2010)

Darrel Robert Miller (March 11, 1929 – May 20, 2010) was an American farmer and politician.

Miller was born in Pine Island, Goodhue County, Minnesota and graduated from Pine Island High School. He lived in Pine Island, Minnesota with his wife and family and was a farmer. He was involved with the Dodge County Fair. Miller served in the Minnesota House of Representatives in 1974 and 1974 and was a Democrat. He died in Pine Island, Minnesota.
