= Naşide Gözde Durmuş =

Turkish geneticist (born 1985)

Naside Gözde Durmuş
- Born: 1985 (age 40–41); İzmir, Turkey
- Education: Middle East Technical University (BS); Boston University (MS); Brown University (PhD)
- Scientific career
- Workplaces: Stanford University

Naside Gözde Durmuş (born 1985) is a Turkish scientist and geneticist. As of 2019, she is Assistant Professor of Radiology at Stanford University. Her research focuses on nanotechnology and micro-technology applications on current world-threatening health issues, like cancer and antibiotic resistance. In 2015, MIT Technology Review listed her under the category of pioneers in the magazine's list of 35 Innovators Under 35.

== Biography ==
Durmuş was born in 1985 in İzmir, Turkey. In 2003, she started her undergraduate studies at the Middle East Technical University, specializing in Molecular Biology and Genetics. Later on, she obtained a Fulbright scholarship and moved to the United States to pursue higher education, achieving a Masters in Engineering from Boston University in 2009, and receiving a Ph.D. degree in Biomedical Engineering from Brown University in May 2013.

Durmus is currently an assistant professor at Stanford University. In 2014, she took a position as a postdoctoral researcher at Stanford. She conducted her postdoctoral research with Ronald W. Davis at the Stanford University Genome Technology Center and Stanford University School of Medicine. In 2015, she has been recognized among the "Top 35 Innovators Under 35" (TR35), as a pioneer in biotechnology and medicine, by MIT Technology Review.

== Career ==
Her work focuses on developing low-cost nanotechnology tools that can be used for the diagnose and treatment of diseases, like for instance a fast method for detecting the physical features of a cell, by having them levitate in a magnetic field, this being able to measure in a shorter period of time how a microbe responds to a certain drug, and making it possible to differentiate cancerous cells from healthy ones.
