= Darryl Hill =

Darryl Hill may refer to:

- Darryl Hill (American football) (born 1943), first African-American football player in the Atlantic Coast Conference
- Darryl Hill (rapper) (born 1969), American rapper best known as Cappadonna
- Darryl Hill (snooker player) (born 1996), Manx professional snooker player

== See also ==
- Daryll Hill (born 1982), American former basketball player at St. John's University (New York)
- Darrell Hill (disambiguation)
- Hill (surname)
