= Daryl Mitchell =

Daryl Mitchell may refer to:

- Daryl Mitchell (actor) (born 1965), American actor
- Daryl Mitchell (English cricketer) (born 1983), English cricketer who played for Worcestershire
- Daryl Mitchell (New Zealand cricketer) (born 1991), New Zealand international cricketer who also plays for Canterbury
