= Darel McKinney =

- Born: Milwaukee, Wisconsin
- Military career
- Allegiance: United States
- Branch: Marine Corps
- Conflicts: World War I
- Awards: Navy Cross

Darel McKinney served in the United States Marine Corps during World War I. He would be awarded the Navy Cross and Distinguished Service Cross for his actions during the Battle of Belleau Wood.

His Navy Cross citation reads:

The President of the United States of America takes pleasure in presenting the Navy Cross to Sergeant Darel Jesse McKinney (MCSN: 90613), United States Marine Corps, for extraordinary heroism while serving with the 83d Company, 6th Regiment (Marines), 2d Division, A.E.F. in action in the Bois-de-Belleau, France, on 8 June 1918. Although severely wounded, Sergeant McKinney refused to go to the rear for treatment. Despite his wounds, he continued to lead his platoon to the attack, inflicting great losses upon the enemy.

His Distinguished Service Cross citation reads:

The President of the United States of America, authorized by Act of Congress, July 9, 1918, takes pleasure in presenting the Distinguished Service Cross to Sergeant Darel Jesse McKinney (MCSN: 90613), United States Marine Corps, for extraordinary heroism while serving with the Eighty-Third Company, Sixth Regiment (Marines), 2d Division, A.E.F., in action in the Bois-de-Belleau, France, on 8 June 1918. Although severely wounded, Sergeant McKinney refused to go to the rear for treatment. Despite his wounds, he continued to lead his platoon to the attack, inflicting great losses upon the enemy.

McKinney was born in Milwaukee, Wisconsin.
