= Seion Darrell =

Bermudian association footballer (born 1986)

Personal information
- Full name: Seion Darrell
- Date of birth: January 16, 1986 (age 40)
- Place of birth: Bermuda
- Height: 5 ft 5 in (1.65 m)
- Position: Defender

Team information
- Current team: Dandy Town Hornets

Senior career*
Years	Team	Apps	(Gls)
2007–2012	Bermuda Hogges	68	(0)
2008–2009	CBU Capers		
2011–	Dandy Town Hornets		

International career^{‡}
2005–2012	Bermuda	12	(0)
- * Club domestic league appearances and goals as of November 14, 2011 ‡ National team caps and goals as of 27 December 2015

Seion Darrell (born January 16, 1986) is a Bermudian football player who currently plays for local side Dandy Town Hornets.

== Club career ==
Darrell has been part of the Bermuda Hogges squad in the USL Second Division since 2007; he remained with the team when the Hogges self-relegated to the USL Premier Development League in 2010. He also had a spell at Canadian college team CBU Capers, playing alongside six compatriots.

== International career ==
He made his debut for Bermuda in a May 2005 friendly match against Trinidad and Tobago and earned a total of 12 caps, scoring no goals. He has represented his country in four FIFA World Cup qualification matches. Darrell played in Bermuda's 3–1 victory over the Cayman Islands on March 30, 2008 in qualifying for the 2010 FIFA World Cup.

His final international match was a September 2012 CONCACAF Gold Cup qualification match against Puerto Rico.
