= Derrell =

Derrell is a given name. Notable people with the name include:

- Derrell Dixon (born 1970), US American Heavyweight boxer
- Derrell Griffith (born 1943), former Outfielder and Third Baseman in Major League Baseball
- Derrell Johnson-Koulianos (born 1987), wide receiver for the Iowa Hawkeyes during the 2007–2010 seasons
- Derrell Mitchell (born 1971), former Canadian Football League slotback
- Derrell Palmer (1922–2009), American football offensive tackle and defensive tackle
- Derrell Robertson (1967–1994), American college football player from Tyler, Texas

== See also ==
- Darrell
