= Durrell =

Durrell is a surname, and may refer to

== Members of the Durrell family ==
- Gerald Durrell
- Jacquie Durrell
- Lawrence Durrell
- Lawrence Samuel Durrell
- Lee McGeorge Durrell
- Louisa Dixie Durrell
- Margaret Durrell
- Leslie Durrell
- Shame Durrell

== Others ==
- Dick Durrell
- Jacquelyn Durrell (died 2009), American politician
- Jim Durrell
- Martin Durrell
- Michael Durrell

== See also ==
- Durrell Wildlife Conservation Trust
- Durel (surname)
