= 1948 Bermudian general election =

General elections were held in Bermuda from 2 to 4 June 1948. Women had been given the right to vote and stand for election in 1944 and had been able to vote in a by-election in Paget in the same year. This was the first general election in which they could vote and be candidates.

There were around 4,120 electors, although this included many property owners who were allowed more than one registration to vote.

== Results ==
Two women were elected, Hilda Aitken and Edna Watson.

Constituency	Candidate	Votes	Notes
Devonshire	Robert Nathaniel Hodgson	156	Elected
Devonshire	John William Cox	154	Elected
Devonshire	Hereward Watlington	153	Elected
Devonshire	Nicholas Bayard Dill	148	Elected
Devonshire	Walter Robinson	82	
Hamilton	Harry North	148	Elected
Hamilton	Percy Outerbridge	142	Elected
Hamilton	Henry Wilkinson	139	Elected
Hamilton	Willis Furbert	123	Elected
Hamilton	Hilton Gray Hill	122	
Hamilton	John Gwynne Bassett	42	
Paget	Ross Winter	170	Elected
Paget	St George Butterfield	166	Elected
Paget	Edna Watson	145	Elected
Paget	W.W. Davidson	125	Elected
Paget	J.E. Frith	117	
Paget	Leon Powell	114	
Paget	J.F. Tucker	57	
Paget	Rejected	2	
Pembroke	H.D. Butterfield	436	Elected
Pembroke	J.E. Pearman	436	Elected
Pembroke	David Tucker	363	Elected
Pembroke	Gilbert Cooper	362	Elected
Pembroke	Morris Gibbons	351	Unseated
Pembroke	Edward Nicholl	243	
St George's	Dudley Spurling	259	Elected
St George's	Samuel Seward Toddings	247	Elected
St George's	E.P.T. Tucker	242	Elected
St George's	Collingwood Burch	234	Elected
St George's	Edgar F. Gordon	216	Unseated
St George's	Frances Fox	42	
Sandys	F.C. Misick	227	Elected
Sandys	C.G. Gilbert	213	Elected
Sandys	Jeffrey Carlton Astwood	184	Elected
Sandys	W.E. Roberts	182	Elected
Sandys	G.O. Ratteray	146	
Sandys	Alice Scott	103	
Smith's	B.C.C. Outerbridge	145	Elected
Smith's	Henry Vesey	145	Elected
Smith's	Hilda Aitken	101	Elected
Smith's	Russell Levi Pearman	87	Elected
Smith's	Howard Mercer	77	
Smith's	Clarence Peniston	44	
Southampton	Reginald Conyers	137	Elected
Southampton	Edgar Roderic Williams	130	Elected
Southampton	George Williams	180	Elected
Southampton	John Vesey	179	Elected
Southampton	Edgar F. Gordon	112	
Southampton	Walter Robinson	100	
Southampton	James Smith	91	
Southampton	Leonard Charles Bascombe	90	
Warwick	Donald Smith	225	Elected
Warwick	E.H. Barnes	180	Elected
Warwick	E.T. Richards	176	Elected
Warwick	Edmond Gibbons	170	Elected
Warwick	F.H. Edmondson	165	
Warwick	Paul Jones	55	
Warwick	Rufus Astwood	35	
Warwick	Earlington Simons	32	
Warwick	Rejected	0	
Source: Royal Gazette, Royal Gazette, Royal Gazette
