= Women in Bermuda =

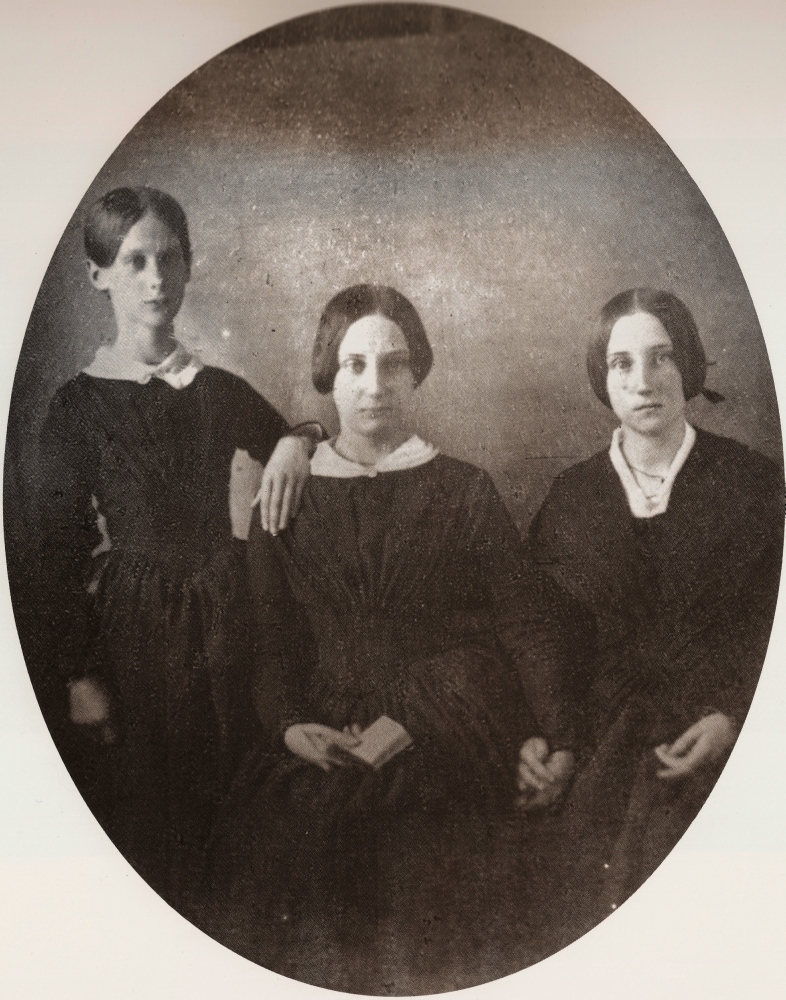
Bermudian sisters Rosalie, Helen and Ellesif Darrell in 1846

The term Women in Bermuda includes British nationals with local status, British nationals without Bermudian status, Commonwealth nationals and foreign nationals who are resident in the British Overseas Territory of Bermuda, although in most cases only the first of these groups is intended to be connoted.

== History ==
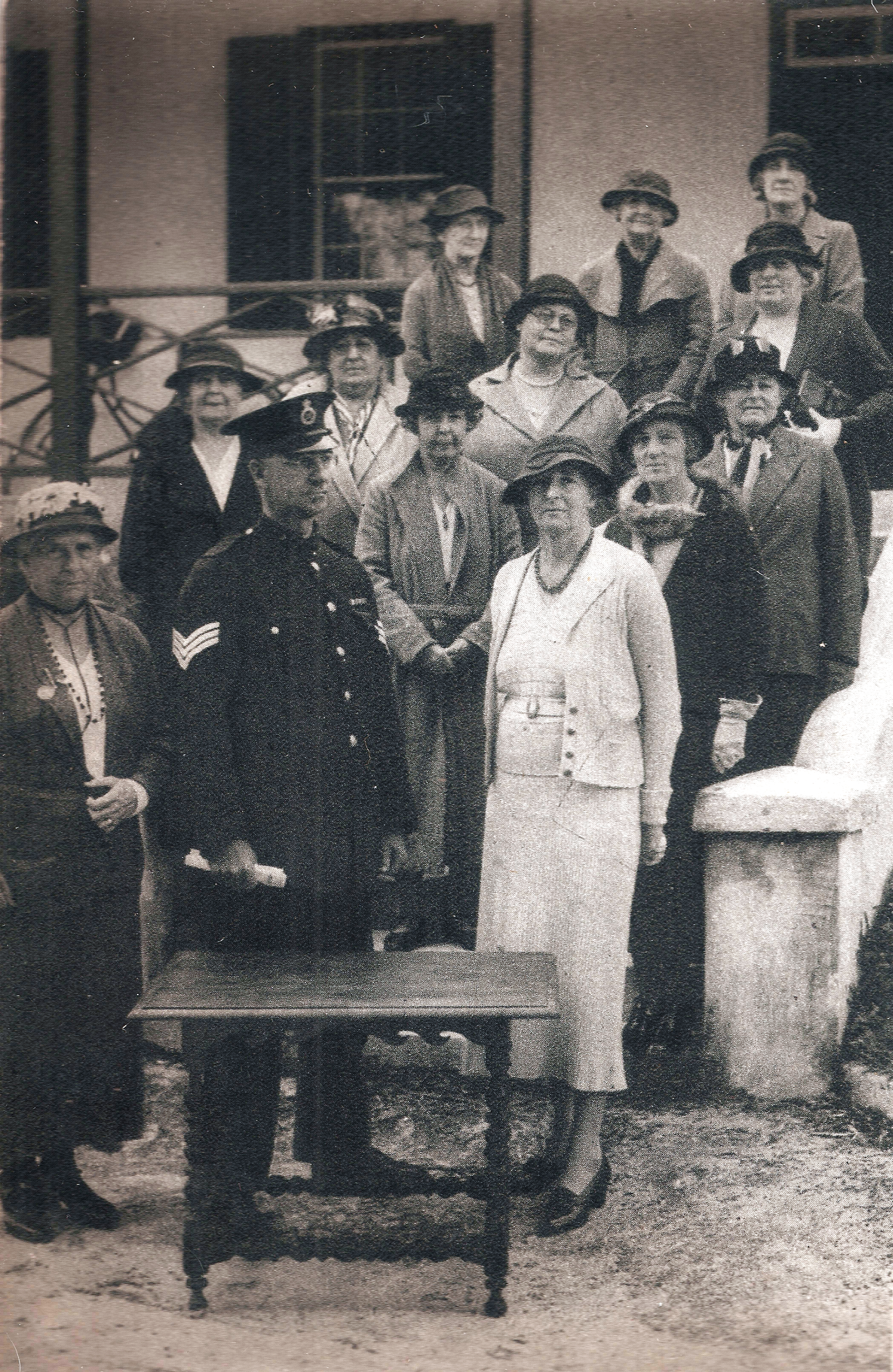
A Police Sergeant confiscates women's suffrage activist Gladys Morrell's table in the 1930s

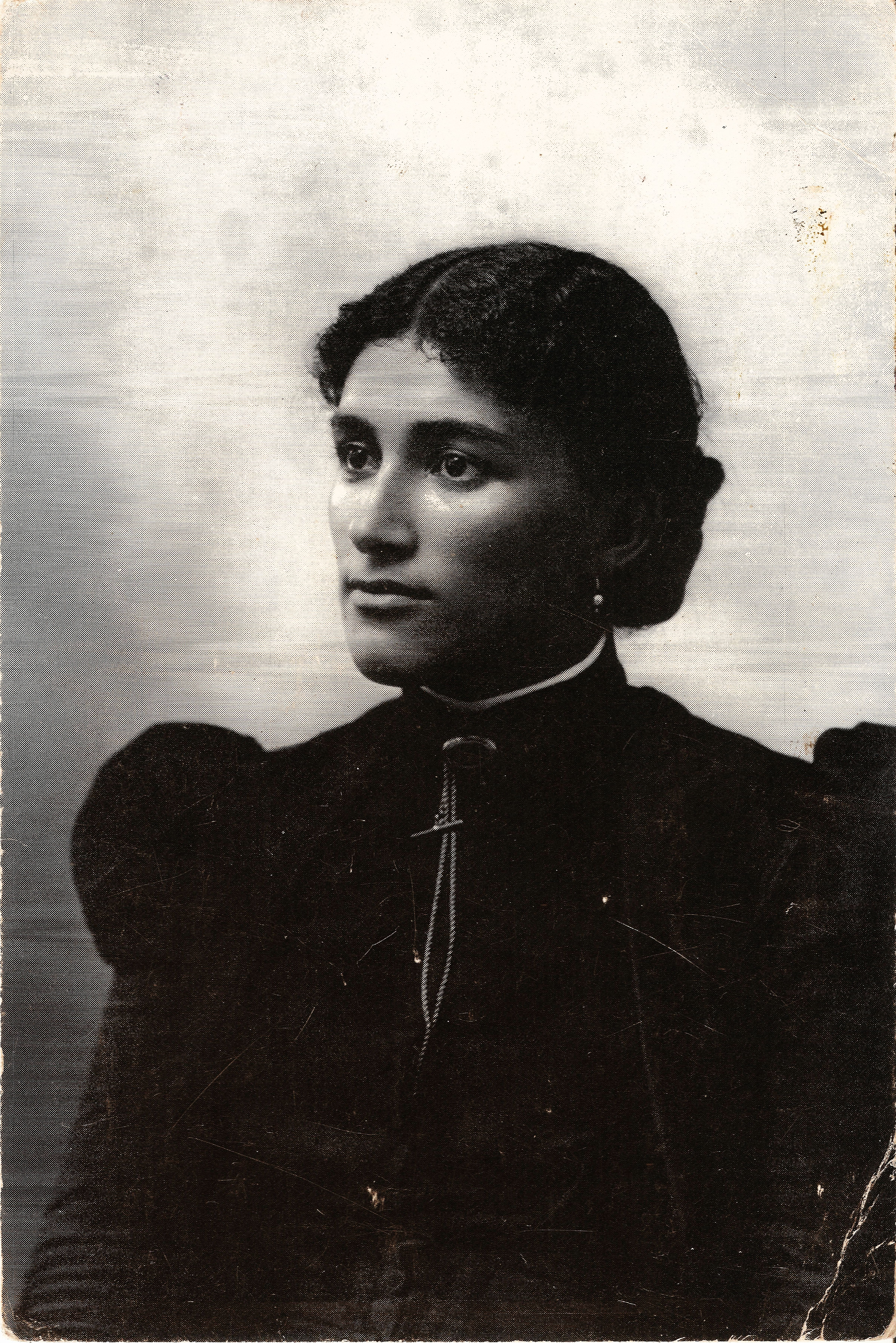
Portrait of Bermudian woman "Rattery" (1885–1890)

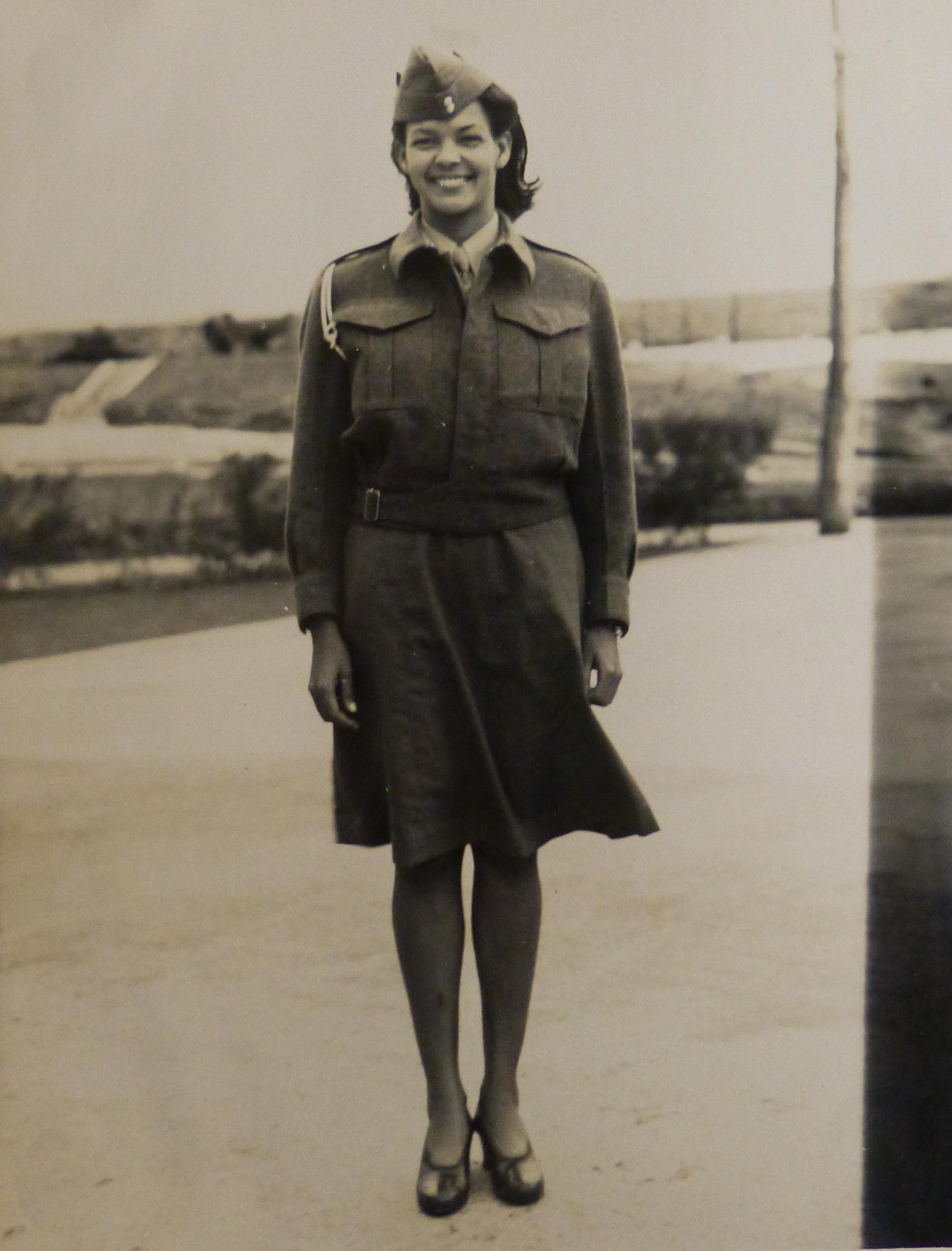
Bermuda Militia Artillery Clerk June Reid at St. David's Battery circa 1944

Although women and girls were among the passengers of the Sea Venture, the flagship of the Virginia Company that was wrecked at Bermuda in 1609, starting the permanent settlement of the archipelago as an English (following the 1707 union of the Kingdom of England and the Kingdom of Scotland, "British") colony, none were among the three (living) people left in Bermuda in 1610 (when most of the crew and passengers continued to Jamestown, Virginia in two newly constructed ships. Also left behind, buried in Bermuda, was Sarah Hacker, the first wife of John Rolfe, and their Bermuda-born child Bermuda. In 1612, with its Royal Charter officially extended to include Bermuda (officially named "Virginiola", and quickly renamed "The Somers Isles") as part of its territory in Virginia, the Virginia Company sent sixty settlers, including women, under a Lieutenant-Governor aboard the "Plough" to join the three men left behind in 1610. An under-company, the Company of the City of London for the Plantacion of The Somers Isles (or Somers Isles Company) was already planned in 1612 and administration of the Somers Isles was transferred to it in 1615, though Bermuda and Virginia continued to be closely interlinked.

Bermuda was grouped with the North American continental colonies until 1783 as part of British America, and from then until 1907 as part of British North America, when the Colony of Newfoundland became the Dominion of Newfoundland, leaving Bermuda as the only remaining British colony in the North American region, and it was thereafter administered by the West Indian Division of the Crown Colonies Department of the Colonial Office, along with all of the other remaining British colonies in the Western Hemisphere, from Bermuda to the Falkland Islands. Bermuda's closest neighbours in order of distance are the United States of America (640 miles), Canada (768 miles) and the nearest West Indian islands (roughly 1,000 miles).

The companies would utilise indentured servitude as a source of cheap labour until the latter company lost its Royal Charter in 1684 and the Crown took over direct administration. Most settlers who arrived voluntarily over the early decades of settlement exchanged seven years of servitude for the cost of their transport. The early settlers were disproportionately men, and female convicts were shipped to Bermuda and sold to local men to provide an adequate supply of brides. During the Civil War, women were among the native Irish who were forcibly exported to Bermuda and other trans-Atlantic colonies and sold into servitude. Native American prisoners from areas of the continent that were ethnically cleansed to make way for settlers were also sent to Bermuda in the mid-17th Century, disproportionately women. Although slavery was not to become the feature it did in other colonies, due to the indentured servants, privateers based at Bermuda from its settlement onwards often brought enslaved Africans or people of African ancestry captured from the Spanish or French or other foes. Others arrived via shipwreck, and after the Civil War there was a considerable influx of coloured indentured servants from former Spanish territories annexed by England.

The founder population of the 17th Century was consequently diverse. All women in Bermuda, regardless of status, were constrained by the same laws as elsewhere in England and its colonies. They had no representation, or ability to stand for election, and their property generally became their husbands' upon marriage. Some men were as cruel to their daughters, wives and enslaved females as was common elsewhere, but in 1684, following the revocation of the Somers Isles Company's charter, Bermudians were freed to develop their maritime economy, and by the 18th Century virtually the only industries were shipbuilding and sea faring.

This had a profound effect on the lot of women as most Bermudian men spent months away at sea, leaving wives to handle matters at home as best as they could, with many becoming competent at managing financial affairs. As a significant number of Bermudian men were lost at sea, there were, as mentioned above, a large number of young widows who, having come into possession of their husband's estates (including what had been their own property 'til marriage) declined to remarry and lose their property to another husband. Being a small, closely-knit community, where good manners and modesty were the norm, when Bermudian men were at home they were mindful of their reputations. Mary Prince, born into slavery in Bermuda, related in " The History of Mary Prince" (1831) vicious attacks on his daughter by one of her masters in which she sought to protect the other woman, chastising him that they were in Bermuda, not the Turks Islands (where some Bermudians, free and enslaved, migrated seasonally to gather salt for sale on the continent, and where, out of sight of their wives and polite society, some men resorted to debauchery they would not dare to at home), and his having her bathe his naked body until she refused, .

My old master often got drunk, and then he would get in a fury with his daughter, and beat her till she was not fit to be seen. I remember on one occasion, I had gone to fetch water, and when I Was coming up the hill I heard a great screaming; I ran as fast as I could to the house, put down the water, and went into the chamber, where I found my master beating Miss D—— dreadfully. I strove with all my strength to get her away from him; for she was all black and blue with bruises. He had beat her with his fist, and almost killed her. The people gave me credit for getting her away. He turned round and began to lick me. Then I said, "Sir, this is not Turk's Island." I can't repeat his answer, the words were too wicked—too bad to say. He wanted to treat me the same in Bermuda as he had done in Turk's Island.

He had an ugly fashion of stripping himself quite naked, and ordering me then to wash him in a tub of water. This was worse to me than all the licks. Sometimes when he called me to wash him I would not come, my eyes were so full of shame. He would then come to beat me. One time I had plates and knives in my hand, and I dropped both plates and knives, and some of the plates were broken. He struck me so severely for this, that at last I defended myself, for I thought it was high time to do so. I then told him I would not live longer with him, for he was a very indecent man—very spiteful, and too indecent; with no shame for his servants, no shame for his own flesh. So I went away to a neighbouring house and sat down and cried till the next morning, when I went home again, not knowing what else to do.

After that I was hired to work at Cedar Hills, and every Saturday night I paid the money to my master.

This led to a marked difference in the way women functioned in Bermuda, and were and are perceived (both by themselves and by men), when compared with Britain, the United States, Canada, or the British West Indies. Bermudian society is often perceived as matriarchal by outsiders.

In 1828, Purser Richard Cotter of the Royal Navy published Sketches of Bermuda, or Somers' Islands, a description of Bermuda based on his own observations while serving there, assigned to the North America Station, listing among his motivations for writing the account:

The friendly hospitality of the men, the mild and gentle demeanour of the women, that needed not a frown to awe the libertine to respect them

Of the prevailing opinion of Bermudians as expressed by other Imperial government officials who had served there, and of his own opinion of Bermudians, he wrote:

It has become too much the fashion amongst the officers of the various branches of the public service to ridicule the Bermudians, after partaking of their hospitality, but the latter are not inferior in any particular to the people of the Mother country; the women are as chaste and as fair, and the men as clever, as friendly, and as hospitable too in proportion to their relative means. It is true, that owing to the relaxation consequent to a warm climate, added, to the expensiveness of apparel, the ladies do not find it convenient to be at home at all times to receive idle visitors, but at the Governor's parties, public balls, and amateur plays, they are neatly dressed, and each lady may claim the merit of being her own dress-maker. The men of business are shrewd and well informed, many of them have acquired their knowledge of trade in America, the mode of that country being better suited to the limited traffic of Bermuda, than the broad scale upon which the mercandize of England is conducted.

He also recorded:

...The population of Bermuda is between nine and ten thousand souls, (if negroes have souls, and one is apt to be of uncle Toby's opinion, that "it would be putting one sadly over the head of another if they had not,") something more than half of this number are whites of whom nearly two thirds are females. This may be accounted for in part from the men, who are of an enterprising spirit, being often obliged to risk their lives in crazy little vessels, badly manned and indifferently navigated, to the West Indies and different parts of America, in search of a field for industry in a commercial line, which their little Colony does not afford. The attachment of the women does not die with their husbands; there are many instances where a lady, widowed in the prime of youth, rejects every offer of conjugal consolation, however advantageous, during the rest of her life.

Susette Harriet Lloyd travelled to Bermuda in company with the Church of England's Archdeacon of Bermuda Aubrey Spencer, Mrs Spencer, and Ella, Miss Parker, Major and Mrs Hutchison and their daughter, the Reverend Robert Whitehead, Lieutenant Thompson of the 74th Regiment of Foot, and Lieutenant Young, aboard HMS Wanderer, which was delivering a military detachment from England to the Bermuda Garrison. Lloyd's visit to Bermuda lasted two years, and her Sketches of Bermuda (a collection of letters she had written en route to, and during her stay in, Bermuda, and dedicated to Archdeacon Spencer) was published in 1835, immediately following the abolition of slavery in Bermuda and the remainder of the British Empire in 1834 (Bermuda elected to end slavery immediately, becoming the first colony to do so, though all other British colonies except for Antigua availed themselves of an allowance made by the Imperial government enabling them to phase slavery out gradually). Lloyd's book gives a rare contemporary account of Bermudian society immediately prior to the abolition of slavery.

Of white Bermudian women, her observations included:

The last assertion, that 'the women are without colour,' I cannot treat as I do the remarks on birds and flowers, for you will expect something beyond a mere description of their persons. Like the plants, they languish in the summer, and when we landed, I saw but few whose cheek retained any tint of the rose; the children, in particular, struck me as having a sickly appearance. But this month of cool weather has already restored their bloom to many. They are tall and slender; though there are a few handsome brunettes, they are generally fair, with light hair and full blue eyes. I have seen some who are really lovely-but it is that evanescent loveliness which does not survive the first bloom of youth. The young girls, who at the age of fifteen or sixteen are just merging into the woman, have an air of charming simplicity-a certain naivete and winningness of manner, which is very pleasing to strangers. They are amiable and affectionate, exemplary in the discharge of the domestic duties, and extremely quiet and retiring; which surprised me, when I heard that, with but few exceptions, the young ladies receive their education in a boys' school. In several of the grammar-schools nearly a third are females, some of whom learn to construe Greek and Latin. As they are great sufferers under a system which prevents them from acquiring the more feminine accomplishments, I am glad to find that several ladies' seminaries are about to be established in Bermuda, which will call forth the talents they undoubtedly possess, and open a wider field for intellectual conversation.

She related more about coloured Bermudians, though she gave no general account of coloured women. Her mentions of specific coloured women included:

There is a black woman here who ranks high as an improvisatrice; every passing event, every one who is so unfortunate as to incur her displeasure, is made the subject of her verse. A slave, an industrious man, to whom she does not bear a very friendly feeling, had the misfortune, a short time ago, to be robbed of a bag in which he had been hoarding some doubloons towards the purchase of his freedom. All pitied the poor fellow; when he one day came up to me in tears, saying that no one would credit his story since Piny had been making a song upon him, which had got all over Hamilton; and when he attempted to enquire after his doubloons, the negroes answered him by singing this song. These verses are of course very uncouth, but possess a great deal of wit.

A singular circumstance occurred a short time since. A slave, after having obtained his own freedom by his industry, went to his master to purchase his wife. When her owner offered to give him her deed of manumission, the man positively refused to have one drawn up: and thus the wife is literally her husband's slave. Surely, if slavery knew no other evil, the abuse of such a power as this would prove the iniquity of the system.

It is a great misfortune to a slave if he happens to be married to a free woman. His time is of course his master's, and yet he must find a house, food and clothing for his wife and family. There is a poor man here, a native North American Indian, who is in this situation, and his family are consequently in great poverty.

Several persons have given freedom to their slaves-oftenest I think to a female. But should the poor woman happen to marry a slave, she is in most cases a sufferer, as all her children are of course free, and dependent upon her for support.

From the 1840s, there has been a steady immigration from Portuguese Atlantic islands, and there has been a considerable immigration during the 20th Century from the British Isles, the British West Indies, the United States, and Canada, among other areas, often causing culture clashes over the perceived treatment of women by men of various demographic groups (with Bermudians sometimes perceiving West Indian and Portuguese immigrants as patriarchal, or even misogynistic). Jennifer M. Smith, the second female Premier of Bermuda, observed that her sex had not been a barrier to her political ascension because "Bermuda is a very matriarchal society, while other Caribbean islands are patriarchal.

In 1923 the Bermuda Women's Suffrage Society was founded. Women's suffrage was finally granted in 1944.
