= Hilda Aitken =

Bermudian politician

- Born: Hilda Smith; July 17, 1891; Smith's Parish, Bermuda
- Died: July 30, 1987 (aged 96)
- Occupation: Politician

Hilda Smith Aitken MCP (July 17, 1891 – July 30, 1987) was one of the first two female members of the colonial parliament of Bermuda, along with Edna Watson, after a campaign by The Women's Suffrage Society for their election to the House of Assembly in 1948.

== Early life ==
Hilda D. Smith was born in Smith's Parish, Bermuda, the daughter of farmers Gilbert S. W. Smith and Clara A. Smith. Her paternal grandmother, Caroline Boyd, was born in London, and moved to Bermuda in 1849, a workhouse child sent to work as a servant in the British colony. Hilda Smith attended the Bermuda High School for Girls.

== Career ==
Hilda Smith worked for the post office before she married in 1914. She was active with the Girl Guides beginning when her children were young. She was a Brownie troop leader for 23 years and the Central District Girl Guide Commissioner. She served on the Board of Health, and on the Smith's Parish Welfare Society board. During World War II, she worked with a government nutrition committee on the island's food supply. She was also a member of the Bermuda Women’s Suffrage Society led by Gladys Morrell; after suffrage was won in 1944, she was active in the society's successor, the Bermuda Women’s Civic and Political Association.

Aitken was elected to the Colonial Parliament of Bermuda in 1948, one of the first two women to serve in that legislature, alongside Edna Watson. She served in the legislature for five years, and chaired the Social Welfare board from 1951 to 1953, and served on committees focused on the island's beaches and on the 1950 census. She lost re-election in 1953, in part because of her successful efforts to include birth control access in a public health bill.

In 1953, Aitken was awarded a Coronation Medal for her public service.

== Personal life ==
Hilda Aitken was married to Robert (Robin) Aitken in 1912; they had two daughters, Joan and Jean. She was widowed in 1970 and she died in 1987, aged 96 years. Her portrait hangs in Bermuda's House of Assembly.
