= Carveth Wells =

British adventurer and writer (1887–1957)

Carveth Wells, photo by Hal Phyfe, c. 1930

Grant Carveth Wells (21 January 1887 – 16 February 1957) was a British adventurer, travel writer, and television personality in the mid-twentieth century.

Wells was the author of eighteen travel-related books, including Six Years in the Malay Jungle, Road to Shalimar, and North of Singapore.

Wells also produced films, radio and television shows relating to his travels.

== Biography ==
Wells was born in Surrey, England, to Bermudian Thomas Grant Wells (1838-1916) and Anna Carkeet (1838-1925). His father was one of a long line of forebears named Thomas Wells, stretching back to the seventeenth-century settlement of the Somers Isles (or Islands of Bermuda), including a member of the Council of Bermuda and Ensign of the Bermuda Militia. His father had been a civilian paymaster of the Royal Naval Dockyard in the Imperial fortress colony of Bermuda. His paternal grandfather, Asael Wells, had been an accountant at the Royal Naval Hospital. He was a cousin of Gladys Carlyon De Courcy Misick Morrell (the daughter of Thalia Jane Dalzell Misick, born Wells), whose maternal grandfather, John McDowell Wells (1827-1871), was the older brother of Thomas Grant Wells.

Carveth Wells' father was injured by criminals attempting to rob him of the payroll in his charge. Insensible, and with a fractured skull, he was sent to the Royal Naval Hospital, Plymouth, at Royal Naval Dockyard, Devonport, England, where he regained consciousness after a piece of his skull was removed. It was thought that his father would not live long and he was advised to apply for a commuted pension and to withdraw the money in a lump sum, which he quickly spent. His father, in fact, lived into his eighties, married in England to his mother, Anna Carkeet, in 1868, and never returned to Bermuda or to Nattie, the young woman there he would presumably otherwise have married. His parents had seven other children: Sarah Louisa Wells (1868–1960), Edward Carthew Wells (1872–1930), Grant MacDowell Wells (1873–1874), Alfred De Vries Wells (1875–1958), Charlotte Elizabeth Dalzell Wells (1877–), Beatrice Carkeet Dalzell Wells (1880–1949), and Olivia Croil Dalzell Wells (1882–1957). His sister Beatrice Carkeet Dalzell Wells was awarded the Queen's South Africa Medal during the Second Boer War and the Defence Medal during the Second World War.

Carveth Wells graduated from London University in 1909, with an engineering degree. In 1912, the British government sent Wells to its then-colony of Malaya, to survey the route for a railroad, and to explore the flora and fauna of the region. Here he was the first person to report an encounter with the Mayah people of the Tanum Valley, Pahang. However, Wells' health suffered badly in Malaya. In 1918, he moved to the United States, and settled in San Francisco. In San Francisco, Wells started lecturing on his travel experiences.

Wells led expeditions to Kenya, Tanganyika, Mt. Ararat, Panama, Mexico, Japan, Morocco, Syria, Egypt, Palestine, India and Manchuria.

In 1932, Wells married his second wife, the former Zetta Robart, after divorcing his first wife, Laura T. Wells, in Mexico. Robart had been Wells' production manager. In 1934, Wells' first wife sued Ms. Robart, alleging misconduct and alienation of affections.

In the early 1930s, Wells and his wife travelled to Soviet Russia, on a trip that would take him to the borders of Turkey, in search of the remains of Noah's Ark. On the trip, Wells observed the Soviet famine of 1932-33, which would eventually kill millions of Russians. Wells also encountered a group living in the Carpathian mountains, which still had chainmail left over from the Crusades. Wells recorded his observations of the trip in his book, Kapoot: The Narrative of a Journey From Leningrad to Mount Ararat in Search of Noah's Ark.

In 1937, the couple built a house, "Mandalay" on Rebecca Road in Southampton Parish, in Bermuda (after initially occupying "Point House"), where Wells' daughter, Frances Carveth Wells was the 1937 Easter Queen, dividing their time between Bermuda and the United States thereafter. Wells' first wife also resided in Bermuda (at "Olivet", on Pitts' Bay Road in Pembroke Parish) at the time of his death in 1957.

In the 1930s and 40s, Wells and his wife began producing films concerning their travels. They jointly produced The Jungle Killer (1932), Russia Today (1933), and Australia Wild and Strange.

In his book, North of Singapore, written in 1939, Wells documented Japanese attitudes towards the United States and China on the eve of World War II.

On that same trip to the Far East, in 1939, Wells adopted a talking mina bird—which he named "Raffles." Raffles appeared with Wells on many radio programs and at theaters. He is credited with helping Wells sell more than $1 million of war bonds in the United States during the Second World War.

Wells lectured widely in the United States, Britain, Norway and Sweden. In 1942, he was a civilian orientation lecturer for servicemen about to go abroad.

On 9 June 1946 the couple produced one of the world's first television shows, Geographically Speaking, which featured home movies of their travels. The show was not recorded, since recording technology did not yet exist. The series ended in December 1946, when the couple ran out of home movies.

At the time of his death, in 1957, Wells and his wife were producing a local television show in New York, called Carveth Wells Explores the World.

== Books by Carveth Wells ==
- Wells, Carveth (1925). Six Years in the Malay Jungle.
- (1925) In Coldest Africa
- (1925) A Jungle Man and His Animals
- (1931) Congo to the Mountains of the Moon: Adventure!
- (1932) Adventure
- (1932) Let's Do the Mediterranean
- Wells, Carveth (1933). Kapoot: the narrative of a journey from Leningrad to Mount Ararat in search of Noah's ark.
- (1933) Light on the Dark Continent
- (1934) Exploring the World With Carveth Wells
- Wells, Carveth (1935). Bermuda in Three Colors.
- Wells, Carveth (1937). Panamexico.
- (1939) Around the World with Bobby and Betty
- (1940) North Of Singapore
- (1941) Raff, the Jungle Bird:The Story of Our Talking Mynah
- Wells, Zetta Robart; Wells, Carveth (1945). Raffles: The Bird who Thinks He is a Person.
- Wells, Carveth (1954). Introducing Africa.
- (1954) The Road To Shalimar
