= Bermuda Woman's Suffrage Society =

Bermuda Woman's Suffrage Society (BWSS) was a women's organization in Bermuda, founded in 1923. The purpose of the BWSS was to campaign for the introduction of women's suffrage rights on Bermuda. The campaign lasted for 22 years before the reform was finally passed in 1944.

== Foundation ==
The issue was first raised on Bermuda when Anna Maria Outerbridge convinced her father to raise it in the parliament in 1895 and again in 1896: the bill passed the House of Assembly but was voted down in the Upper House.

The organized women's suffrage campaign on Bermuda started in 1918 with a public speech by Gladys Misick Morrell, who had returned to Bermuda after having participated in the women's suffrage campaign in Britain, which had finally succeeded in that year. Women's suffrage was introduced in Britain in 1918, but the reform was not introduced in the British colony of Bermuda since it had a separate Parliament.

In March 1923, Morrell invited the British suffragette Mabel Ramsey to hold a public speech in Mechanics Hall in Hamilton. The meeting finished with the decision to found an organization to conduct an organized suffrage campaign in Bermuda.

Bermuda Woman's Suffrage Society was founded in 1923 with Rose Gosling as president and Gladys Misick Morrell as secretary, and had its first meeting in April that year. Among its members were Henrietta Tucker and Mrs. J.P. Hand, also known as the co-founders of the Bermuda Welfare Society.

== Campaign ==
In 1925 Emmeline Pankhurst made a tour to Bermuda, and public speeches and debate was held culminating in a reform petition being introduced to Parliament by Stanley Spurling. Two more petitions were delivered via Spurling in 1928 and 1929.

In 1928 Gladys Misick Morrell tried to register as a voter in Sandys Parish Vestry since the Parish Vestries Act was phrased gender neutrally. As a response, Supreme Court. Attorney General Col. Thomas Dill rewrote the law to specify the voter as a male.

In 1930 the Bermuda Woman's Suffrage Society petitioned the British Government and asked for a Commission, pointing out that of a population of 30,884, only 1,377 people could vote.

In 1931, Morrell met with Sidney Webb, Lord Passfield, Secretary of State for the Colonies, in London. The British Government encouraged Bermuda to consider the reform. Several Bermudan suffragists, such as Henrietta Tucker and May Hutchings, refused to pay taxes without representation.

On 18 December 1931 a public demonstration was held outside of Mangrove Bay Police Station in Somerset where the suffragettes advocated for an abolition of the property based suffrage by performing a theater play about an auction, a demonstration that attracted attention also internationally. This form of demonstration was held several times during the 1930s. Several celebrities, such as Hervey Allen, Dudley Field Malone and Nancy Astor, attended and spoke at the suffrage meetings.

In 1942 the organization was accused of only including white upper class women. As a response they focused on gaining members among the colored population, and elected the colored Alice Scott to the BWSS management committee.

== Victory ==
On 21 April 1944, the reform was finally passed by the Bermudan parliament after a three hour debate, and became law on 15 May 1944. The Conservative Sir Henry Tucker finally gave his support with the argument that women had contributed greatly to the war work, and Eustace Cann of the Party for Colored changed the former conviction of the colored fraction that women's suffrage would be an obstacle to introduce full suffrage for colored men.

Gladys Misick Morrell became the first woman elected to a local council in 1946, and Hilda Aitken and Edna Watson the first women MP's in 1948.
