= Jeffrey Carlton Astwood =

Bermudian politician (1907–1997)

Sir Jeffrey Carlton Astwood CBE ED (1907−1997) was speaker of the House of Assembly of Bermuda. He was commanding officer of the Bermuda Volunteer Rifle Corps by 1946 and, in 1965, became commander of the Bermuda Regiment, which was formed by a merger of the Volunteer Rifle Corps with the Bermuda Militia Artillery. He was first elected to the House of Assembly of Bermuda in the 1948 general election to represent Sandys Parish. He was one of the 24 members of the house that formed the United Bermuda Party in 1964.

== Biography ==
Astwood served with the Bermuda Volunteer Rifle Corps, being appointed captain on 1 November 1935 and to the temporary rank of major on 1 May 1941. Astwood was lieutenant-colonel and commander of the Volunteer Rifle Corps when he was appointed an Officer of the Order of the British Empire (military division) in the 1946 New Year Honours. He also held the Efficiency Decoration (territorial division) by this point.

Astwood was first elected to the House of Assembly of Bermuda in the 1948 general election, winning 184 votes to become one of four members for the parish of Sandys. By 1961 he was serving as deputy speaker of the House of Assembly.

In 1964 he was one of the 24 members of the house that formed the United Bermuda Party, formed in response to the formation of the territory's first political party, the Progressive Labour Party the year before. He later became speaker of the house.

Astwood became the first commanding officer of the Bermuda Regiment which was formed in 1965 by the merger of the all-white Volunteer Rifle Corps with the largely black Bermuda Militia Artillery. In the 1966 Birthday Honours Astwood was appointed a Commander of the Order of the British Empire in the civil division for public service in Bermuda. By 1968 he had ceased to be commander of the Bermuda Regiment. In the 1972 Birthday Honours he became a knight bachelor, by this time he was speaker of the House of Assembly.
