= Hal Phyfe =

American photographer and illustrator

Herold Rodney Eaton "Hal" Phyfe (1892–1968) was a Broadway photographer famous for his theatrical portraits of the 1920s and 1930s. His photos have been described as "competent, but not in the Cecil Beaton or Edward Steichen league".

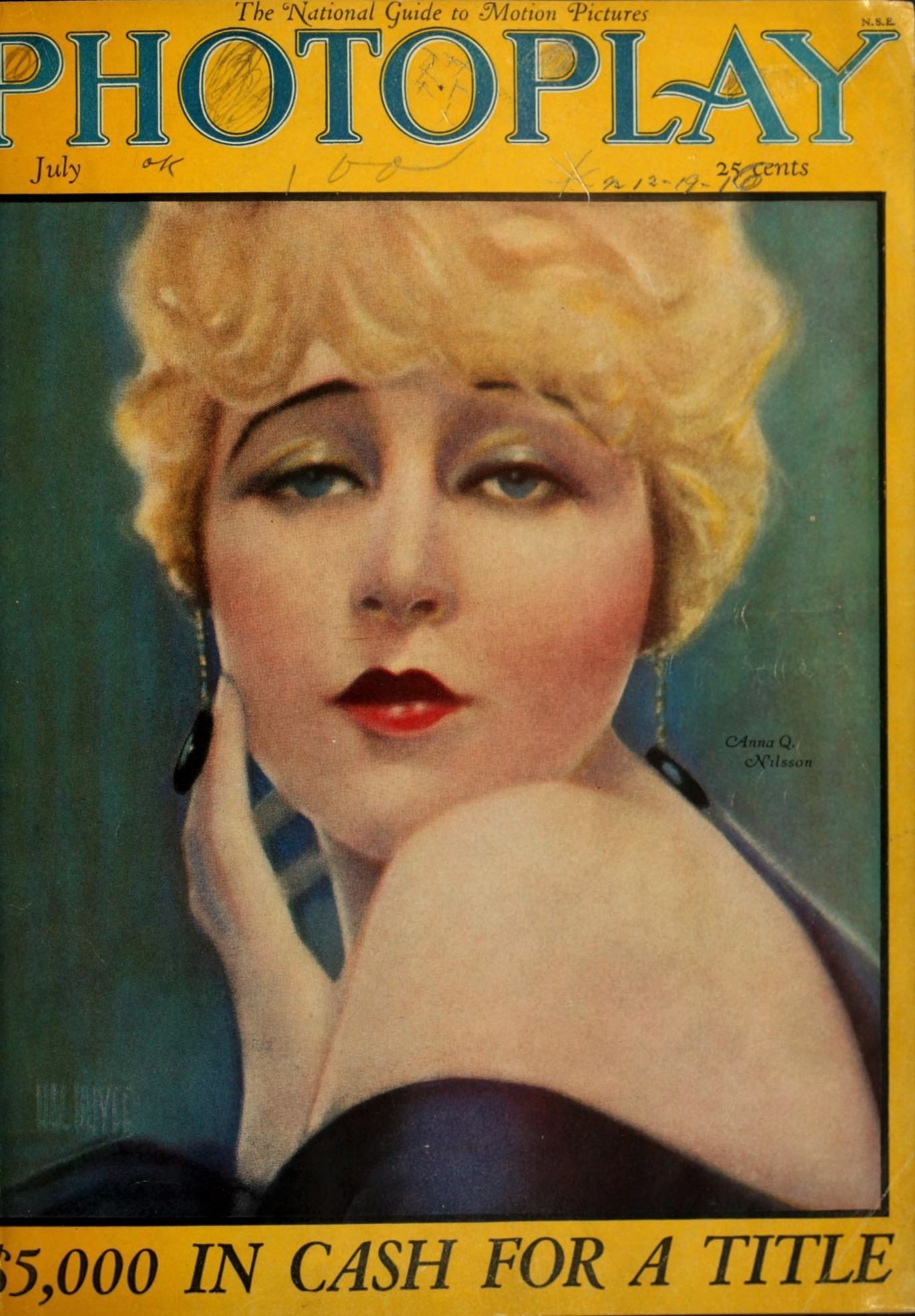
Anna Q. Nilsson by Hal Phyfe, 1924

== Biography ==
Hal Phyfe was born into an American family based in Nice, France. He is a descendant of the American furniture designer Duncan Phyfe. He opened a New York photography studio in 1926. He photographed a range of celebrities including Florenz Ziegfeld Jr., Anna Q. Nilsson and Carveth Wells. He became known as "the official photographer to high society" and "one of the best amateur cooks in Manhattan". He asked his subjects not to smile as they were being photographed.
