= Gladys Morrell =

Bermudian suffragette leader (1888–1969)

- Born: Gladys Carlyon De Courcy Misick; 2 June 1888; Somerset, Bermuda
- Died: 6 January 1969 (aged 80)
- Resting place: Somerset, Bermuda
- Education: Bermuda High School; North London Collegiate School; Royal Holloway College, London University
- Occupations: Social politician, suffragette
- Spouse: John Morrell (m. 1926)
- Relatives: Grant Carveth Wells (cousin)

Gladys Carlyon De Courcy Misick Morrell (2 June 1888 – 6 January 1969) was a Bermudian suffragette leader, who advocated for women's voting rights in Bermuda for 30 years, and founded the Bermuda Welfare Society. She was designated a National Hero of Bermuda in 2015.

== Biography ==
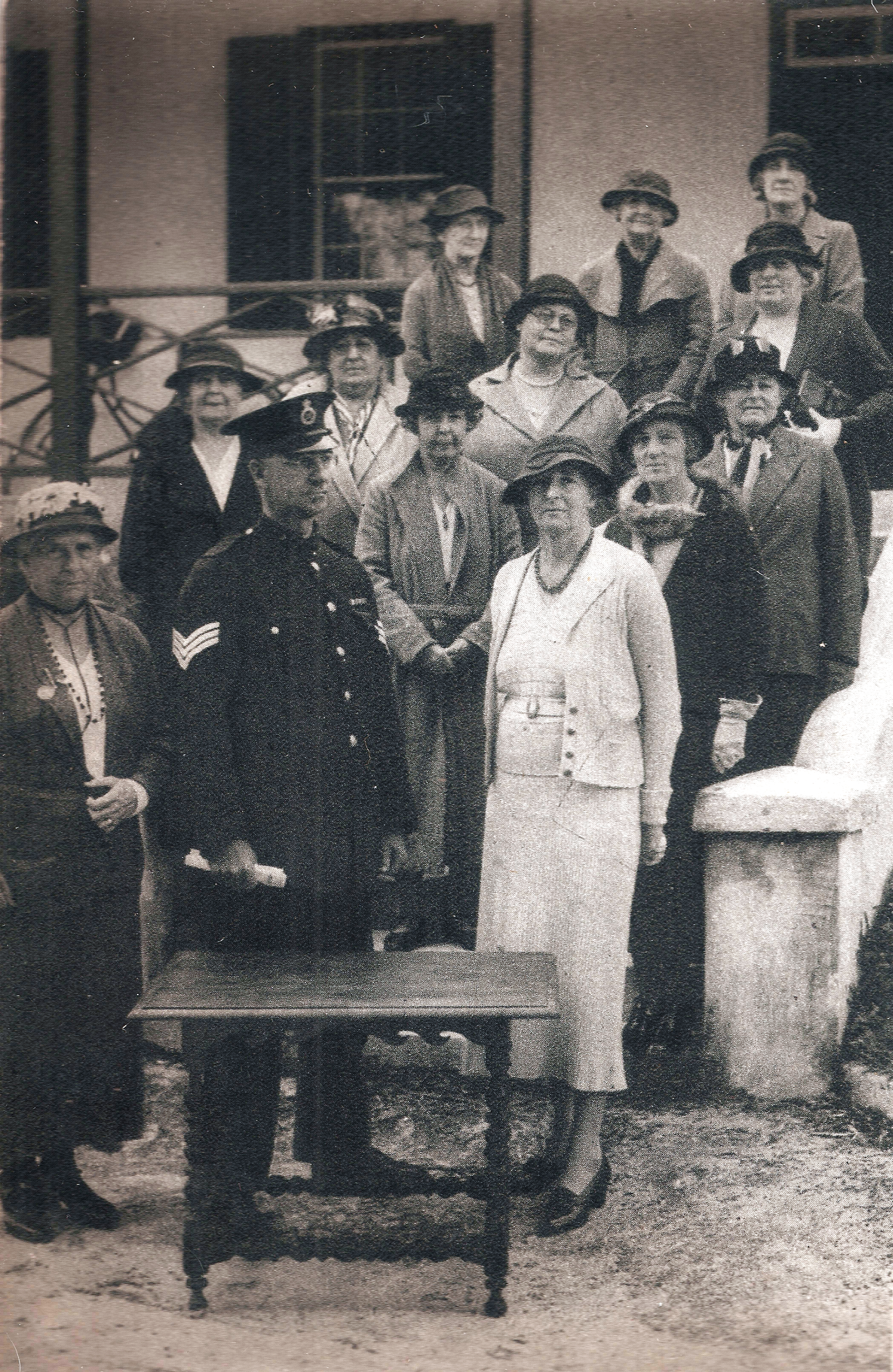
A police sergeant confiscates Morrell's table in the 1930s

Gladys Morrell was born in Somerset, Bermuda, the daughter of Terrence Misick and Thalia Jane Dalzell Misick (née Wells, who had been born in British Guiana to Bermudian parents). She was a cousin of Grant Carveth Wells, whose father, Thomas Grant Wells (1838–1916), was the younger brother of her maternal grandfather, John McDowell Wells (1827–1871).

She attended Bermuda High School and North London Collegiate School, and went on to receive an honours bachelor's degree from Royal Holloway College, London University, in 1911, becoming one of the first Bermudians to earn a university degree; her ambition to become a lawyer, however, was unfulfilled because law schools in England did not admit women until 1919. After graduating, she travelled to India to visit her brother John, and on her return to England, she took up working and organising in the women's suffrage movement, and was active in Millicent Fawcett's National Union of Women's Suffrage Societies until the end of 1913.

She went home the following year and began a woman suffrage campaign in Bermuda, holding the first meeting in St. George's in 1914. On the outbreak of World War I, she travelled back to England with the aim of assisting the war effort. Supporting herself by working in an insurance firm in London, she then volunteered with the Red Cross, and subsequently worked close to the front lines in Verdun, France, serving food to soldiers and tending the wounded, until she fell ill herself and was sent back to England in 1918 – which was also the year that Britain brought in legislation giving the franchise to women over 30 and Morrell was able to vote for the first time.

Returning to Bermuda in 1919, she dedicated herself to what would be a long struggle fighting for the right of women to vote. In 1923 the Bermuda Women's Suffrage Society was established, with Morrell as its secretary and effective leader. In 1925, she also co-founded the Bermuda Welfare Society, which established the district nursing service. Rallies and public meetings of the suffrage movement were organised throughout the 1920s, and the campaigning escalated in the 1930s: every year when Morrell refused to pay her taxes because she was not allowed to vote, her furniture was seized and taken away for auction at Somerset Police Station, where suffragettes gathered and bought it back annually; however, it would not be until 1944 that Morrell's efforts succeeded in ensuring voting rights for property-owning women in Bermuda.

== Private life and death ==
She married retired Royal Navy officer John Morrell on 20 April 1926, and their daughter Rachel (later Bromby) was born in 1928.

Gladys Morrell died aged 80 in 1969; she was buried in the family tomb at St. James Church, Somerset, Bermuda.

== Legacy and honours ==
On 1 May 2000, a commemorative pack of postage stamps was issued honouring Gladys Morrell as one of three "Pioneers of Progress" – the others being Sir Henry James Tucker and Dr Edgar Fitzgerald Gordon – who made a significant and lasting contribution to Bermudian society.

On 14 November 2014, Gladys Morrell was posthumously awarded the fifth annual Peace and Justice Award given by the Roman Catholic Church.

She was named a National Hero of Bermuda for 2015, along with Sir Edward T. Richards, being inducted in a ceremony on 14 June 2015.

The Gladys Morrell Nature Reserve in Bermuda's Sandy's Parish was named in her honour, in recognition of her concern about environmental issues.
