= Gilbert Cooper =

Bermudian businessman

Sir Gilbert Alexander Cooper CBE, ED

Mayor of Hamilton
- In office 1963–1972

Member of the House of Assembly of Bermuda
- In office 1948–1968

Personal details
- Born: 31 July 1903
- Died: 29 May 1989 (aged 85)
- Education: McGill University
- Occupation: Businessman; politician

Sir Gilbert Alexander "Gibby" Cooper CBE ED (31 July 1903 – 29 May 1989) was a businessman and politician in Bermuda, serving as a member of the House of Assembly and Mayor of Hamilton, Bermuda. After graduating from McGill University with a degree in commerce, he worked for his family's business, A.S. Cooper & Sons Ltd., a department store in Front Street, Bermuda, where he later became chairman of the board of directors.

Cooper joined the Bermuda Volunteer Rifle Corps in 1921, becoming an officer in 1928, and served during the Second World War at Prospect Camp on the island. In 1944 he became chairman of the Chamber of Commerce and was appointed to the Trade Development Board. He served as a member of the House of Assembly from 1948 to 1968, and as chairman of its Finance Committee from 1959 to 1968. He was Mayor of Hamilton from 1963 to 1972, when he was awarded a knighthood for public services.
