= Bermuda High School =

Location
- 19 Richmond Road; Pembroke Parish; Bermuda
- Coordinates: 32.2955°N 64.7898°W

Information
- Website: bhs.bm

The Bermuda High School is a private school in Pembroke, Bermuda. It was founded in 1894. It is an all-girls school from the Early Years Programme to Year 11, and co-educational for the two-year IB Diploma Programme.

== Foundations ==
BHS was founded in 1896 by Grosvenor Tucker, who found that not everyone could afford to send their daughters to England. The school was based on the lines of Cheltenham Ladies' College in England. The school was situated on Reid Street and in the beginning had 60 students and three teachers.

Matilda Tothill was the first head mistress. William Barr donated the premises, Russel Hastings donated a large amount of money to the school and Mrs. Middleton was an art teacher at BHS for over 30 years. Thus the four houses were named after them: Tothill, Barr, Hastings and Middleton.

The school is a member of Round Square.

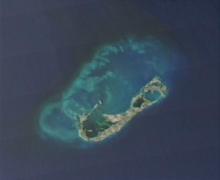
Bermuda

== International Baccalaureate ==
BHS was the first school in Bermuda to offer its students the International Baccalaureate Programme in 2000. The IB Diploma Programme is designed as an academically challenging and balanced programme of education with final examinations that prepares students, usually aged 15 to 18, for success at university and life beyond. The programme is usually taught over two years and has gained recognition and respect from the world's leading universities.

== The Torch Ceremony ==
This is a ceremony that takes place every year as current students and alumni gather in a spiral circle in order of youngest to oldest. The Head Students walk through the spiral carrying the school's torch. Each student touches the torch with their right hand as they pass by, signifying the passing of the torch. The first ceremony was in May 1937. It is always conducted on a Thursday. The ceremony is carried out in complete silence as the torch bearer walks the torch around the spiral.

== Administration ==
The Head of School is Linda Parker. The Head of IB is Sarah Wheddon, Head of Secondary is Catherine Hollingsworth and the Head of Primary is Martina Harris.

== See also ==
- List of girls' schools in the United Kingdom
