= Edna Watson =

Bermudan politician

Edna Irene Watson MCP (2 August 1895, Montreal - 1 March 1976) was a Bermudian politician, physiotherapist, and social reformer. In 1948 she and Hilda Aitken became the first women elected to the House of Assembly of Bermuda, marking a milestone in the island's political history.

She represented the Paget parish from 1948 to 1953 after a campaign by The Women's Suffrage Society for her election to the House of Assembly.

== Biography ==
Watson was born on August 2, 1895, in Montreal, Canada, and trained as a physiotherapist at McGill University. Before her marriage, she worked in Toronto and Winnipeg treating Canadian servicemen returning from the First World War.

She first visited Bermuda in 1924 with her husband, Robert B. Watson, a merchant and Royal Canadian Air Force gunner, and the couple settled on the island three years later. They built a home in Paget, where they operated a guest house and small farm. After her husband's death in 1938, Watson returned temporarily to Canada.

=== Cavalier air crash (1939) ===
In 1939, nearly a decade before entering politics, Watson gained national recognition for her heroism following the crash of Imperial Airways’ flying boat Cavalier en route from New York to Bermuda. She was among ten survivors who endured almost eleven hours in the Atlantic Ocean after the aircraft went down.

Watson was credited with saving the life of the injured captain, Roland Alderson, by keeping him afloat and encouraging other survivors until rescue arrived.

For her actions, she received the Royal Humane Society’s Silver Medal for "saving life at great personal risk", presented later that year by the Governor of Bermuda, Sir Reginald Hildyard.

Later that year she enlisted in the Canadian Army Medical Corps, serving as a physiotherapist in England and Italy during the Second World War.

== Political career ==
Returning to Bermuda after the war, she entered politics in 1948. Following the extension of voting rights to female property owners, Watson stood for election as one of three women candidates in Bermuda's general election. She won the seat for Paget Parish, while Hilda Aitken was elected in Smith's, becoming together the first women to serve in the House of Assembly.

During her term, Watson chaired the Transport Control Board and the Social Welfare Board and later established the Committee of 25, which founded Bermuda's first children's convalescent hospital.
