= Bermuda =

British Overseas Territory in the North Atlantic

- British Overseas Territory
- Flag Coat of arms
- Motto: "Quo Fata Ferunt" (Latin) (English: "Whither the Fates carry (us)")
- Anthem: "God Save the King" (Note: "God Save the King" is the national anthem by custom, not statute, and there is no authorised version. Typically only the first verse is usually sung, although the second verse is also often sung as well at state and public events. The words King, he, him, his, used at present, are replaced by Queen, she, her when the monarch is female.)
- Territorial anthem: "Hail to Bermuda"
- Sovereignty: United Kingdom
- English settlement: 1609; 417 years ago (officially becoming part of the Colony of Virginia in 1612; 414 years ago)
- Capital: Hamilton; 32°17′46″N 64°46′58″W
- Largest city: St. George's; 32°22′46″N 64°40′40″W
- Official languages: English
- Common languages: Bermudian English
- Demonym(s): Bermudian
- Government: Parliamentary dependency under a constitutional monarchy
  - Monarch: Charles III
  - Governor: Andrew Murdoch
  - Premier: David Burt
- Legislature: Parliament
  - Upper house: Senate
  - Lower house: House of Assembly

Government of the United Kingdom
  - Minister: Uma Kumaran

Area
  - Total: 53.2 km^{2} (20.5 sq mi)
  - Water (%): 27
- Highest elevation: 79 (Note: On Town Hill) m (259 ft)

Population
  - 2026 estimate: 63,680 (not ranked)
  - 2016 census: 63,779
  - Density: 1,338/km^{2} (3,465.4/sq mi) (10th)
- GDP (nominal): 2024 estimate
  - Total: BD$9.194 billion
  - Per capita: BD$143,878
- HDI (2013): ▲0.981 very high
- Currency: Bermudian dollar ($) (BMD)
- Time zone: UTC– 04:00 (AST (Note: Standard time in Bermuda is four hours behind Greenwich Mean Time (GMT). UTC is not permitted to drift more than 0.9 seconds from GMT.))
  - Summer (DST): UTC– 03:00 (ADT)
- Calling code: +1 441
- ISO 3166 code: BM; BMU
- Internet TLD: .bm
- Website: https://www.gov.bm/

Bermuda (Note: /bərˈmjuːdə/) (Note: Historically known as the Bermudas or Somers Isles; the latter name is still bore by the official title of the Governor of Bermuda as "Governor and Commander-in-Chief of the Somers Isles (alias the Islands of Bermuda)".) is a British Overseas Territory in the North Atlantic Ocean. The closest land outside the territory is in the US state of North Carolina, about 1,035 km (643 mi) to the west-northwest.

Bermuda is an archipelago consisting of 181 islands, although the most significant islands are connected by bridges and appear to form one landmass. It has a land area of 54 square kilometres (21 sq mi). Bermuda has a tropical climate, with warm winters and hot summers. Its climate also exhibits oceanic features similar to other coastal areas in the Northern Hemisphere with warm, moist air from the ocean ensuring relatively high humidity and stabilising temperatures. Bermuda is prone to severe weather from recurving tropical cyclones; however, it receives some protection from a coral reef and its position north of the Main Development Region, which limits the direction and severity of approaching storms.

Divided into nine parishes, Bermuda is a self-governing parliamentary democracy with a bicameral parliament located in the capital Hamilton. The House of Assembly, which is the lower house of the Parliament, dates from 1620, making it one of the world's oldest legislatures. The premier is the head of government and is formally appointed by the governor, who is nominated by the British government as the representative of the King. The United Kingdom is responsible for foreign affairs and defence. An independence referendum was held in 1995 with a large majority voting against independence.

As of 2026, the population of Bermuda was 63,680, making it the second-most populous of the British Overseas Territories. Black Bermudians, a diverse population primarily of any mixture of African, European, and Native American ancestry, make up around 50% of the population, while White Bermudians, primarily of British, Irish and Portuguese descent, make up 30% of the population. There are smaller groups from other races or identifying as mixed race and about 30% of the population is not Bermudian by birth. The last remaining territory in the former British North America (following the 1867 Confederation of Canada and the Colony of Newfoundland becoming the Dominion of Newfoundland in 1907), Bermuda has a distinct dialect of English and historically had strong ties with other English-speaking countries in the Americas, including the United States, Canada, and the Commonwealth Caribbean. It is an associate member of the Caribbean Community.

== History ==
=== Discovery ===
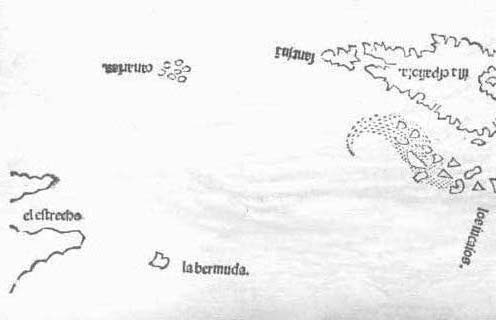
First map of the islands of Bermuda in 1511, made by Peter Martyr d'Anghiera in his book Legatio Babylonica

Bermuda was discovered in the early 1500s by Spanish explorer Juan de Bermúdez and named after him (the surname Bermudez being derived from the German "Beremund"). It had no Indigenous population when it was discovered. It was mentioned in Legatio Babylonica, published in 1511 by historian Pedro Mártir de Anglería, and was included on Spanish charts of that year. Both Spanish and Portuguese ships used the islands as a replenishment spot to take on fresh meat and water. Shipwrecked Portuguese mariners are now thought to have been responsible for the 1543 inscription on Portuguese Rock, previously called Spanish Rock. Legends arose of spirits and devils, now thought to have stemmed from the calls of raucous birds (most likely the Bermuda petrel, or cahow) and loud nocturnal noises from introduced wild hogs. With its frequent storm-racked conditions and dangerous reefs, the archipelago became known as the "Isle of Devils". Neither Spain nor Portugal attempted to settle it.

=== Settlement by the English ===
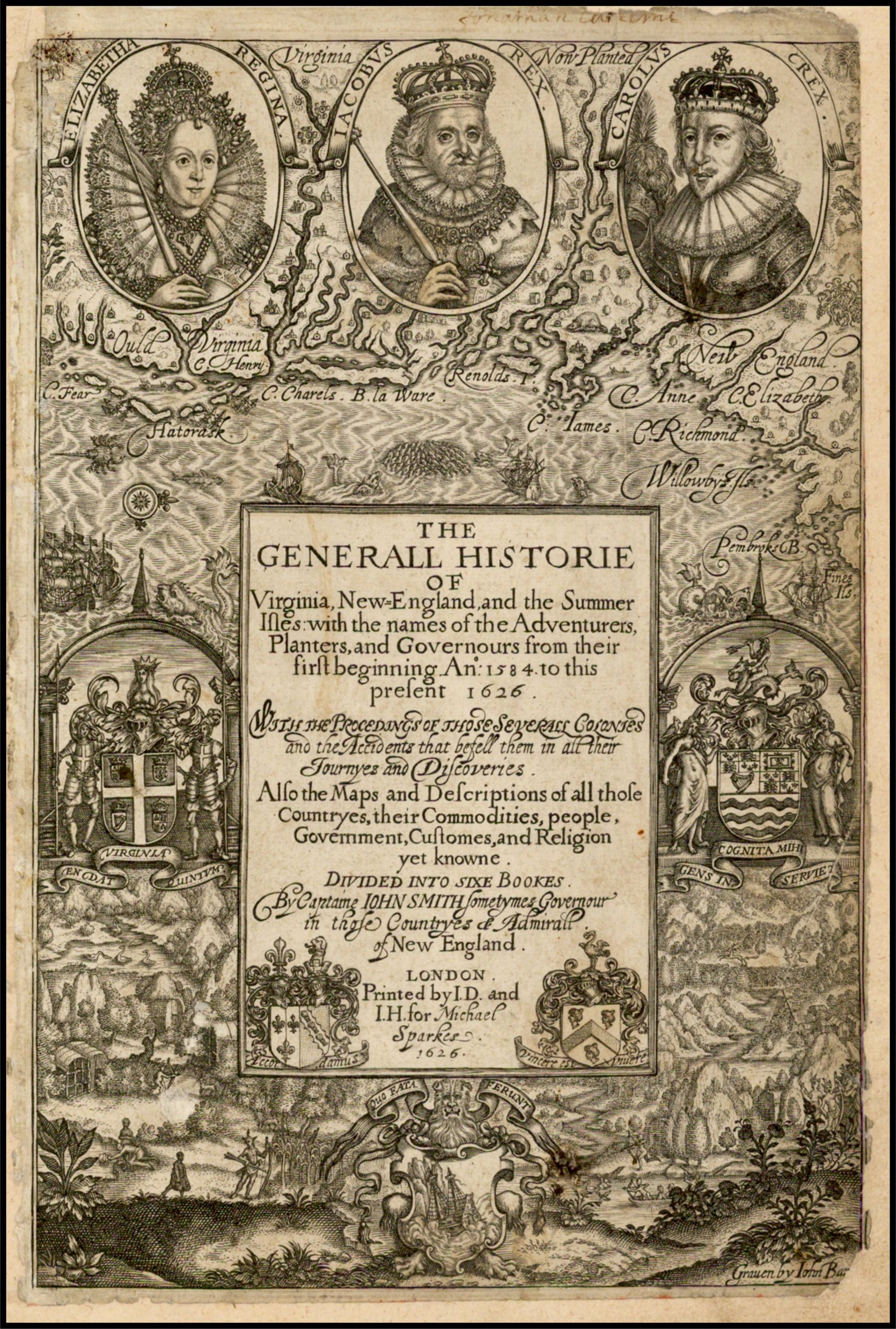
John Smith wrote one of the first histories of Bermuda in 1624 (combined with Virginia and New England).

For the next century, the island was frequently visited but not settled. The English began to focus on the New World, starting British colonisation in North America by establishing a colony at Jamestown, Virginia in 1607. Two years later, a flotilla of seven ships left England with several hundred settlers, food, and supplies to relieve the Jamestown colony. However, the flotilla was broken up by a storm and the flagship, the Sea Venture, drove onto Bermuda's reef to prevent her sinking, resulting in the survival of all her passengers and crew. The settlers were unwilling to move on, having now heard about the true conditions in Jamestown from the sailors, and made several attempts to rebel and stay in Bermuda. They argued that they had a right to stay and establish their own government. The new settlement became a prison labour camp and built two ships, the Deliverance and the Patience.

In 1612 the English began settlement of the archipelago, officially named Virgineola, with the arrival of the ship the Plough. New London (renamed St George's Town) was settled that year and designated as the colony's first capital. It is the oldest continuously inhabited English town in the New World. In 1616 and 1620 acts were passed banning the hunting of certain birds and young sea turtles. The archipelago's limited land area and resources led to the Bermuda Assembly passing An Act Agaynst The Killing Of Ouer Young Tortoyses, which may be the earliest conservation law in the New World.

==== Slavery in Bermuda ====
In 1615 the colony, which had been renamed the Somers Isles in commemoration of Sir George Somers, was passed on to the Somers Isles Company. As Bermudians settled the Carolina Colony and contributed to establishing other English colonies in the Americas, several other locations were named after the archipelago. During this period the first slaves were held and trafficked to the islands. These were a mixture of native Africans who were trafficked to the Americas via the African slave trade and Native Americans who were enslaved from the new world colonies. The first two slaves arrived in Bermuda in 1616, not from Africa but from the West Indies, one being Black and the other Native American, after Bermuda Governor Tucker had sent the ship "Edwin" to the West Indies to find slaves to dive for pearls in Bermuda. There proved to be no pearls to dive for. More black slaves were later trafficked to the island in large numbers, originating from America and the Caribbean.

As the black population grew, so did the fear of insurrection among the white settlers. In 1623 a law was passed that forbade black slaves to buy or sell, barter or exchange tobacco or any other produce for goods without the consent of their master. Unrest among the slaves predictably erupted several times over the next decades. Major rebellions occurred in 1656, 1661, 1673, 1682, 1730 and 1761. In 1761 a conspiracy was discovered that involved the majority of the black slaves on the island. Six slaves were executed and all black celebrations were prohibited.

=== English Civil War ===
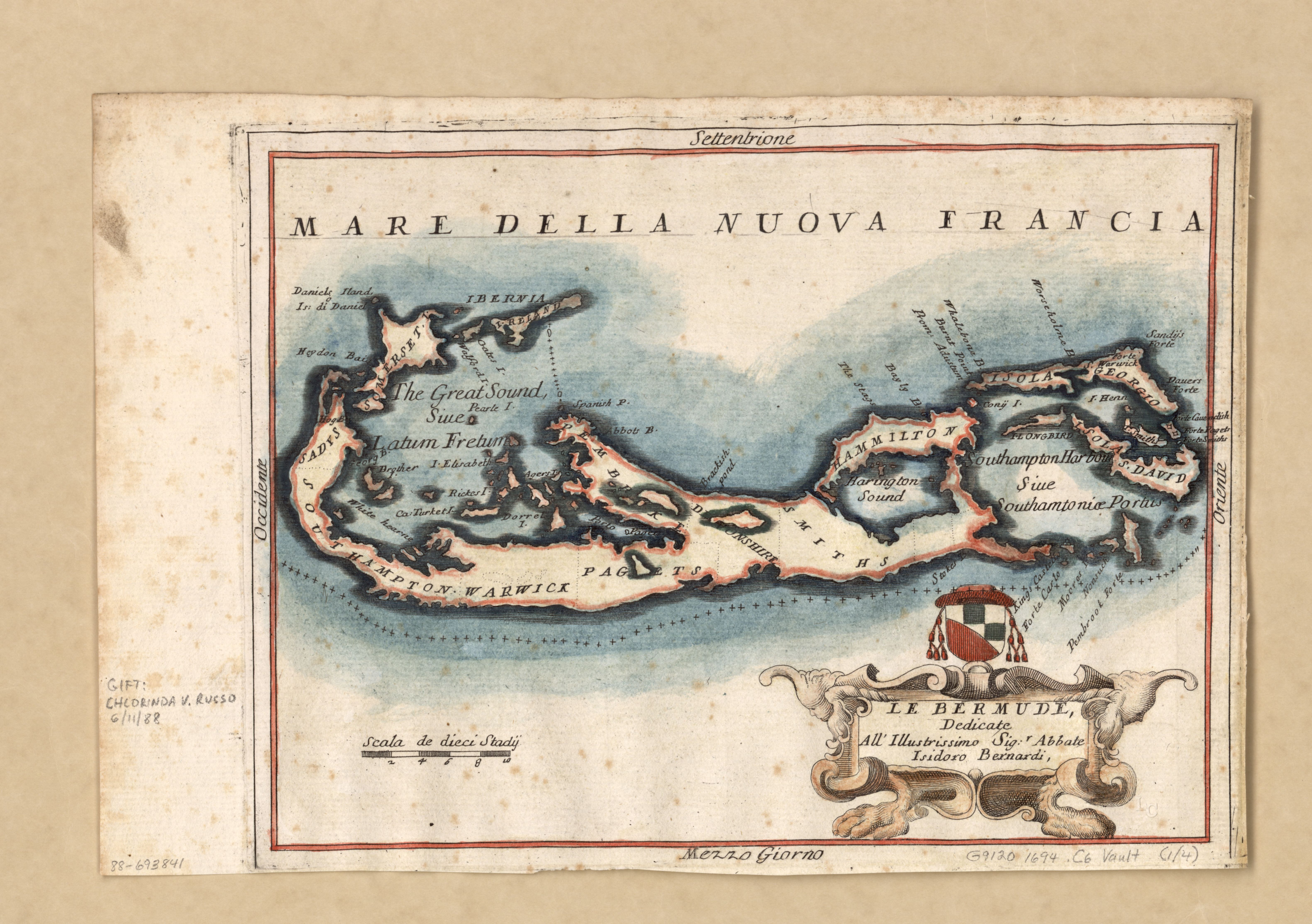
Map of Bermuda by Vincenzo Coronelli, 1 January 1692

In 1649 King Charles I was beheaded in Whitehall, London, in the wake of the English Civil War. The conflict spilled over into Bermuda, where most of the colonists developed a strong sense of devotion to the Crown. The royalists ousted the Somers Isles Company's Governor and elected John Trimingham as their leader (see Governor of Bermuda). Bermuda's civil war was ended by militias and dissenters were pushed to settle The Bahamas under William Sayle.

The rebellious royalist colonies of Bermuda, Virginia, Barbados and Antigua were the subjects of a punitive Act of the Rump Parliament of England. The royalist colonies were also threatened with invasion. The Government of Bermuda eventually reached an agreement with the Parliament of England that retained the status quo in Bermuda. In 1655 fifty-four Bermudians became the first English subjects to settle permanently on the Island of Jamaica, followed by a further 200 Bermudians in 1658, following Cromwell's Invasion of Jamaica. Sayle returned to Bermuda, and to local government, after the war, before leading the settlement of Charleston and Carolina Colony from Bermuda in 1670. The war would lead to voluntary and involuntary immigration to Bermuda from new areas, including Irish and Scottish prisoners of war, indentured servants from former Spanish territories, and indigenous Americans, including Wampanoags ethnically cleansed from their homeland after King Philip's War (as Pequots had been sent to Bermuda following the Pequot War).

=== Later 17th century ===
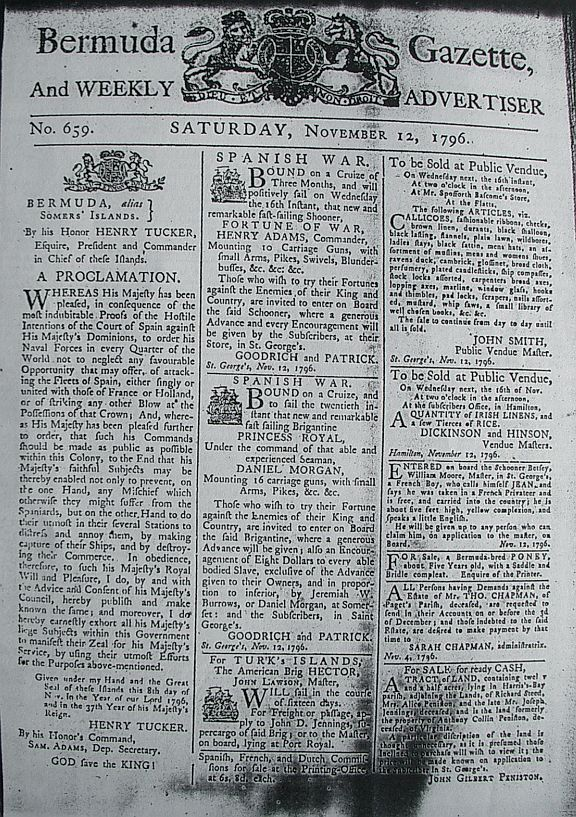
Bermuda Gazette of 12 November 1796, calling for privateering against Spain and its allies; it has advertisements for crew for two privateer vessels.

In the 17th century, the Somers Isles Company suppressed shipbuilding, as it needed Bermudians to farm to generate income from the land. The Virginia colony, however, far surpassed Bermuda in quality and quantity of tobacco produced. Bermudians began to turn to maritime trades relatively early in the 17th century, but the Somers Isles Company used all its authority to suppress turning away from agriculture. This interference led to islanders demanding, and receiving, revocation of the company's charter in 1684, and the company was dissolved.

Bermudians rapidly abandoned agriculture for shipbuilding, replanting farmland with the native juniper trees (Juniperus bermudiana, called Bermuda cedar). Establishing effective control over the Turks Islands, Bermudians deforested their landscape to begin the salt trade. Bermudians also vigorously pursued whaling, privateering, and the merchant trade.

Some islanders, especially in St David's, still trace their ancestry to Native Americans, and others are unaware that they have such ancestry. Hundreds of Native Americans were shipped to Bermuda. The best-known examples were the Algonquian peoples such as Pequots, Wampanoags, Podunks, Nipmucks, Narragansetts and others who were exiled from the New England colonies and sold into slavery in the seventeenth century, notably in the aftermaths of the Pequot War and King Philip's War; some are believed to have been brought from as far away as Mexico.

=== American War of Independence ===
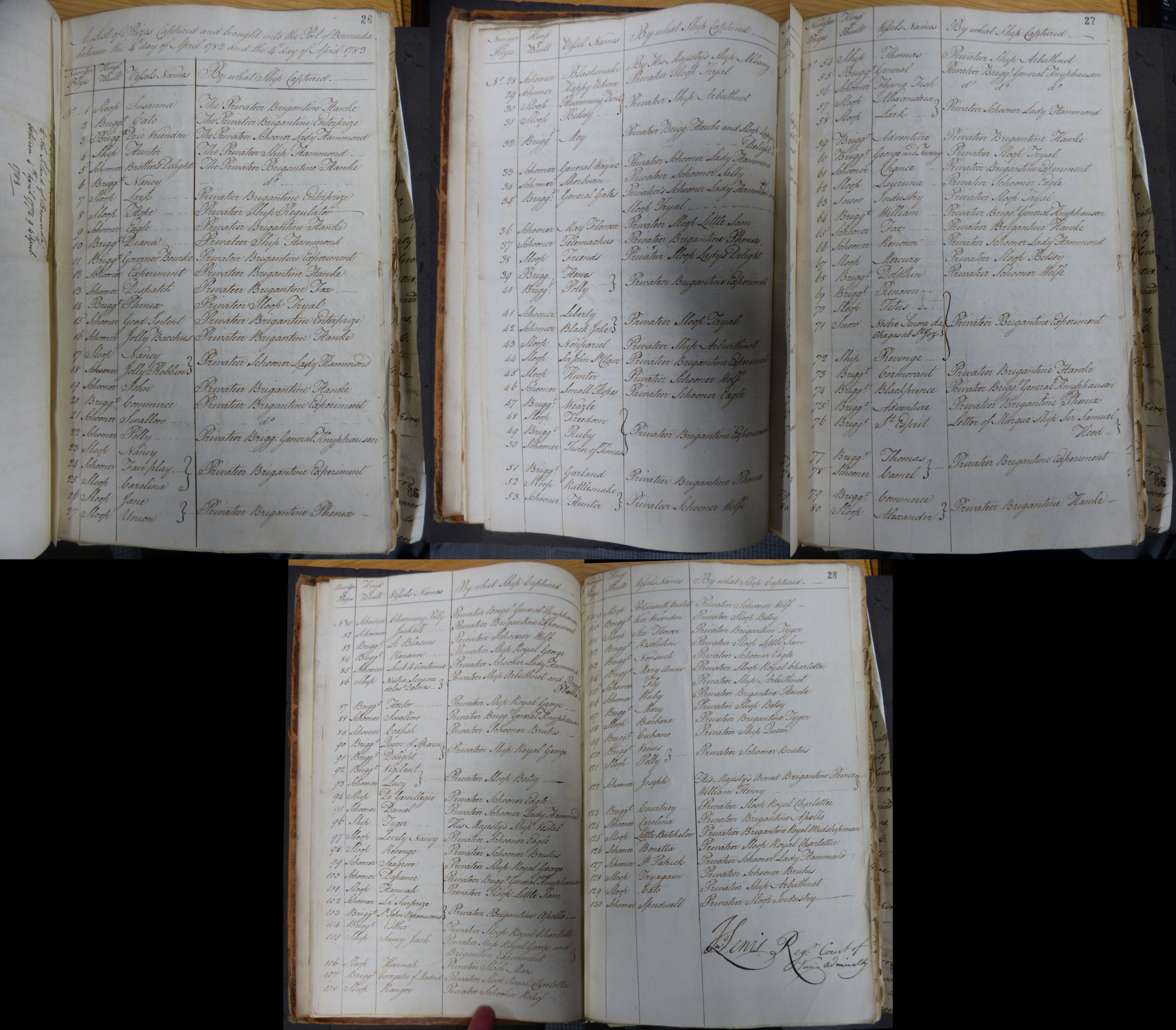
130 prizes captured and brought into Bermuda between 1782-04-04 and 1783-04-04

Bermuda's ambivalence towards the American rebellion changed in September 1774, when the Continental Congress resolved to ban trade with Great Britain, Ireland, and the West Indies after 10 September 1775. Such an embargo would mean the collapse of their inter-colonial commerce, famine and civil unrest. Lacking political channels with Great Britain, the Tucker Family met in May 1775 with eight other parishioners and resolved to send delegates to the Continental Congress in July, aiming for an exemption from the ban. Henry Tucker noted a clause in the ban which allowed the exchange of American goods for military supplies. The clause was confirmed by Benjamin Franklin when Tucker met with the Pennsylvania Committee of Safety. Independently, others confirmed this business arrangement with Peyton Randolph, the Charlestown Committee of Safety, and George Washington.

Three American boats, operating from Charlestown, Philadelphia and Newport, sailed to Bermuda, and on 14 August 1775, 100 barrels of gunpowder were taken from the Bermudian magazine while Governor George James Bruere slept, and loaded onto these boats. As a consequence, on 2 October the Continental Congress exempted Bermuda from their trade ban, and Bermuda acquired a reputation for disloyalty. Later that year, the British Parliament passed the Prohibitory Act to prohibit trade with the American rebelling colonies and sent HMS Scorpion to keep watch over the island. The island's forts were stripped of cannons. Yet, wartime trade of contraband continued along well-established family connections. With 120 boats by 1775, Bermuda continued to trade with St. Eustatius until 1781 and provided salt to North American ports.

In June 1776, HMS Nautilus secured the island, followed by HMS Galatea in September. Yet, the two British captains seemed more intent on capturing prize money, causing a severe food shortage on the island until the departure of Nautilus in October. After France's entry into the war in 1778, Henry Clinton refortified the island under the command of Major William Sutherland. As a result, 91 French and American ships were captured in the winter of 1778–1779, bringing the population once again to the brink of starvation. Bermudian trade was severely hampered by the combined efforts of the Royal Navy, the British garrison and loyalist privateers, such that famine struck the island in 1779.

Upon the death of George Bruere in 1780, the governorship passed to his son, George Jr., an active loyalist. Under his leadership, smuggling was stopped, and the Bermudian colonial government was populated with like-minded loyalists. Even Henry Tucker abandoned trading with the United States, because of the presence of multiple privateers.

The Bermuda Gazette, Bermuda's first newspaper, began publishing in 1784. The editor, Joseph Stockdale, had been given financial incentive to move to Bermuda with his family and establish the newspaper. He also provided other printing services and operated Bermuda's first local postal service. The Bermuda Gazette was sold by subscription and delivered to subscribers, with Stockdale's employee also delivering mail for a fee.

=== 19th century ===
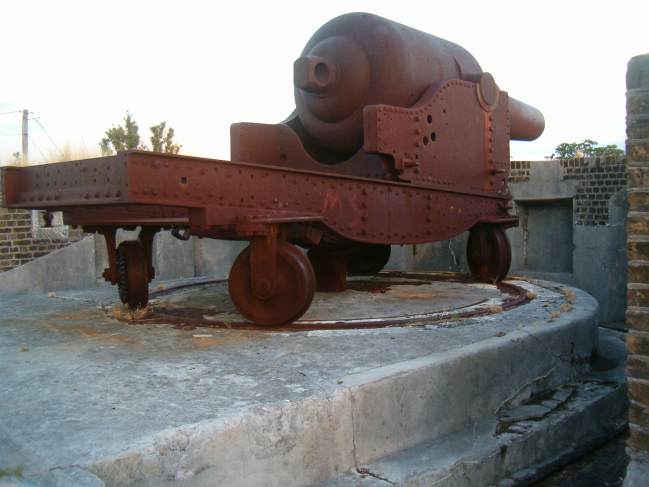
RML 11 inch 25 ton gun at Fort George in St. George's, Bermuda.

After the American Revolution, the Royal Navy began improving the harbours on the Bermudas. In 1811, work began on the large Royal Naval Dockyard on Ireland Island, which was to serve as the islands' principal naval base guarding the western Atlantic Ocean shipping lanes. To guard the dockyard, the British Army built the Bermuda Garrison, and heavily fortified the archipelago.

During the War of 1812 between Britain and the United States, the British attacks on Washington, D.C., and the Chesapeake were planned and launched from Bermuda, where the headquarters of the Royal Navy's North American Station had recently been moved from Halifax, Nova Scotia.

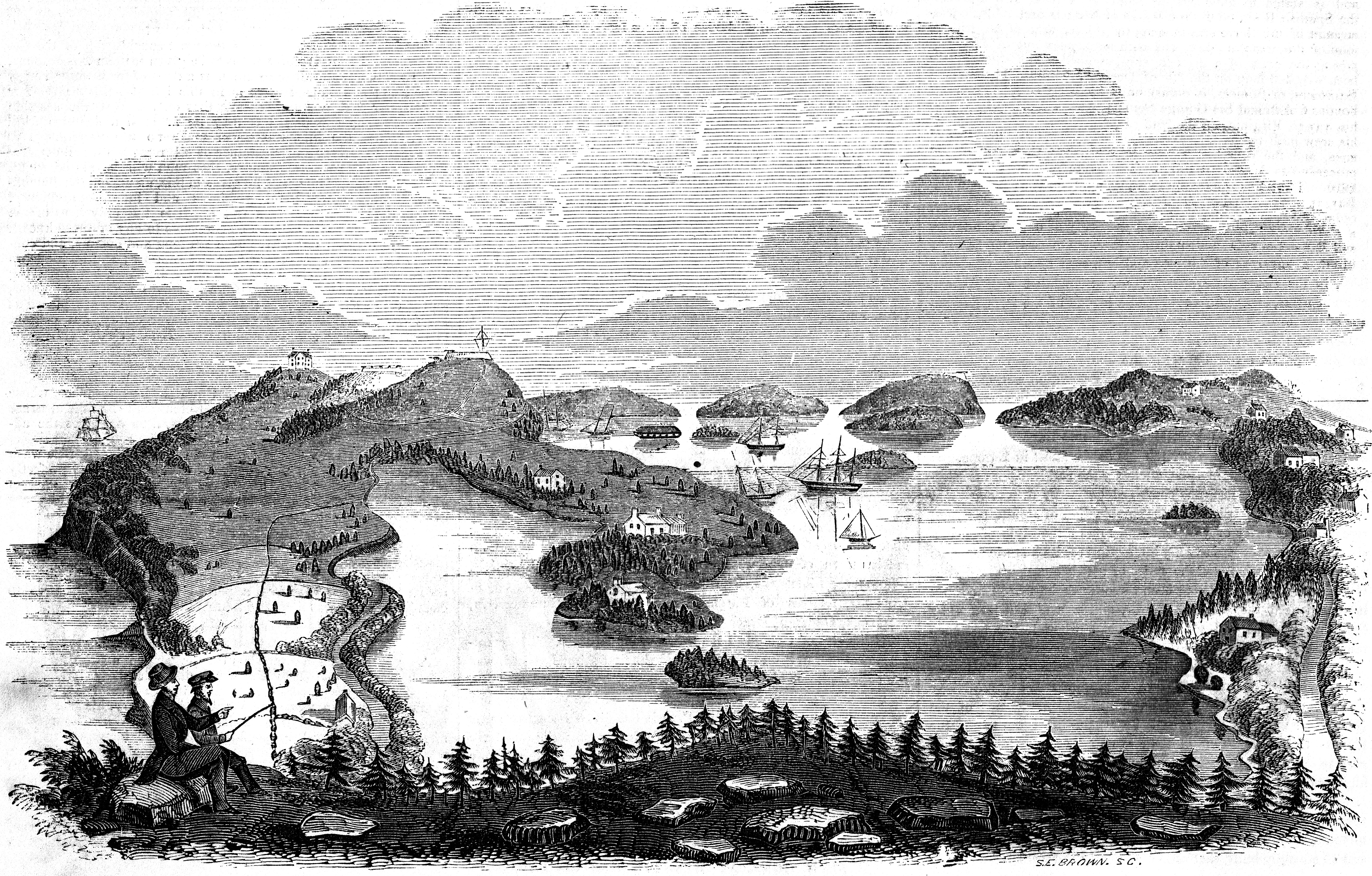
Mullet Bay and the harbour at St. George's, the original capital

In 1816, James Arnold, the son of Benedict Arnold, fortified Bermuda's Royal Naval Dockyard against possible US attacks. Today, the National Museum of Bermuda, which incorporates Bermuda's Maritime Museum, occupies the Keep of the Royal Naval Dockyard.

Due to its proximity to the southeastern US coast, Bermuda was frequently used during the American Civil War as a stopping point base for the Confederate States' blockade runners on their runs to and from the Southern states, and England, to evade Union naval vessels on blockade patrol. The blockade runners were then able to transport essential war goods from England and deliver valuable cotton back to England. The old Globe Hotel in St. George's, which was a centre of intrigue for Confederate agents, is preserved as a public museum.

==== Anglo-Boer War ====
During the Anglo-Boer War (1899–1902), 5,000 Boer prisoners of war were housed on five islands of Bermuda. They were located according to their views of the war. "Bitterenders" (Afrikaans: Bittereinders), who refused to pledge allegiance to the British Crown, were interned on Darrell's Island and closely guarded. Other islands such as Morgan's Island held 884 men, including 27 officers; Tucker's Island held 809 Boer prisoners, Burt's Island 607, and Ports Island held 35. Hinson's Island housed underage prisoners. The camp cemetery is on Long Island.

The New York Times reported an attempted mutiny by Boer prisoners of war en route to Bermuda and that martial law was enacted on Darrell's Island.

The most famous escapee was the Boer prisoner of war Captain Fritz Joubert Duquesne, who was serving a life sentence for "conspiracy against the British government and on (the charge of) espionage". On the night of 25 June 1902, Duquesne slipped out of his tent, worked his way over a barbed-wire fence, swam 1.5 miles (2.4 km) past patrol boats and bright spotlights, through storm-swept waters, using the distant Gibbs Hill Lighthouse for navigation until he arrived ashore on the main island. He settled in the US and later became a spy for Germany in both World Wars. In 1942, Col. Duquesne was arrested by the FBI for leading the Duquesne Spy Ring, which to this day remains the largest espionage case uncovered in the history of the United States.

=== 20th and 21st centuries ===
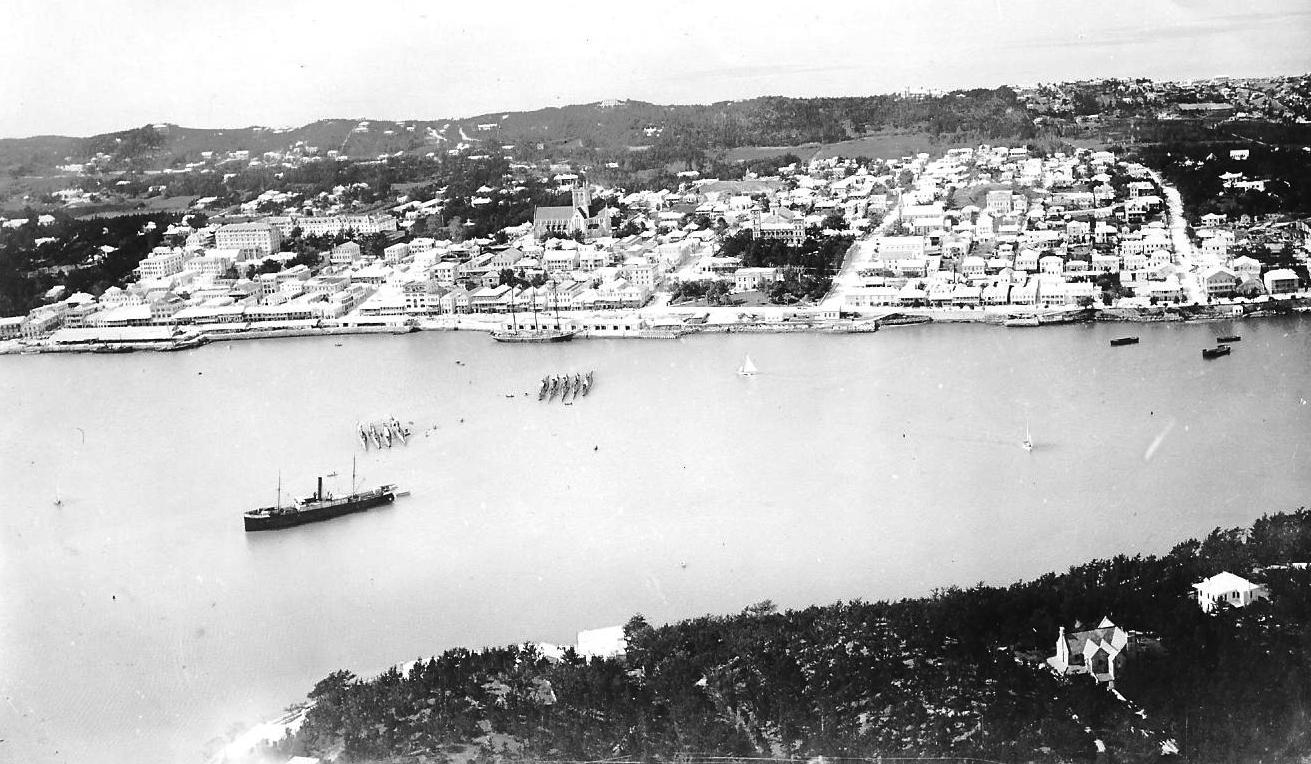
Hamilton Harbour in the mid-1920s

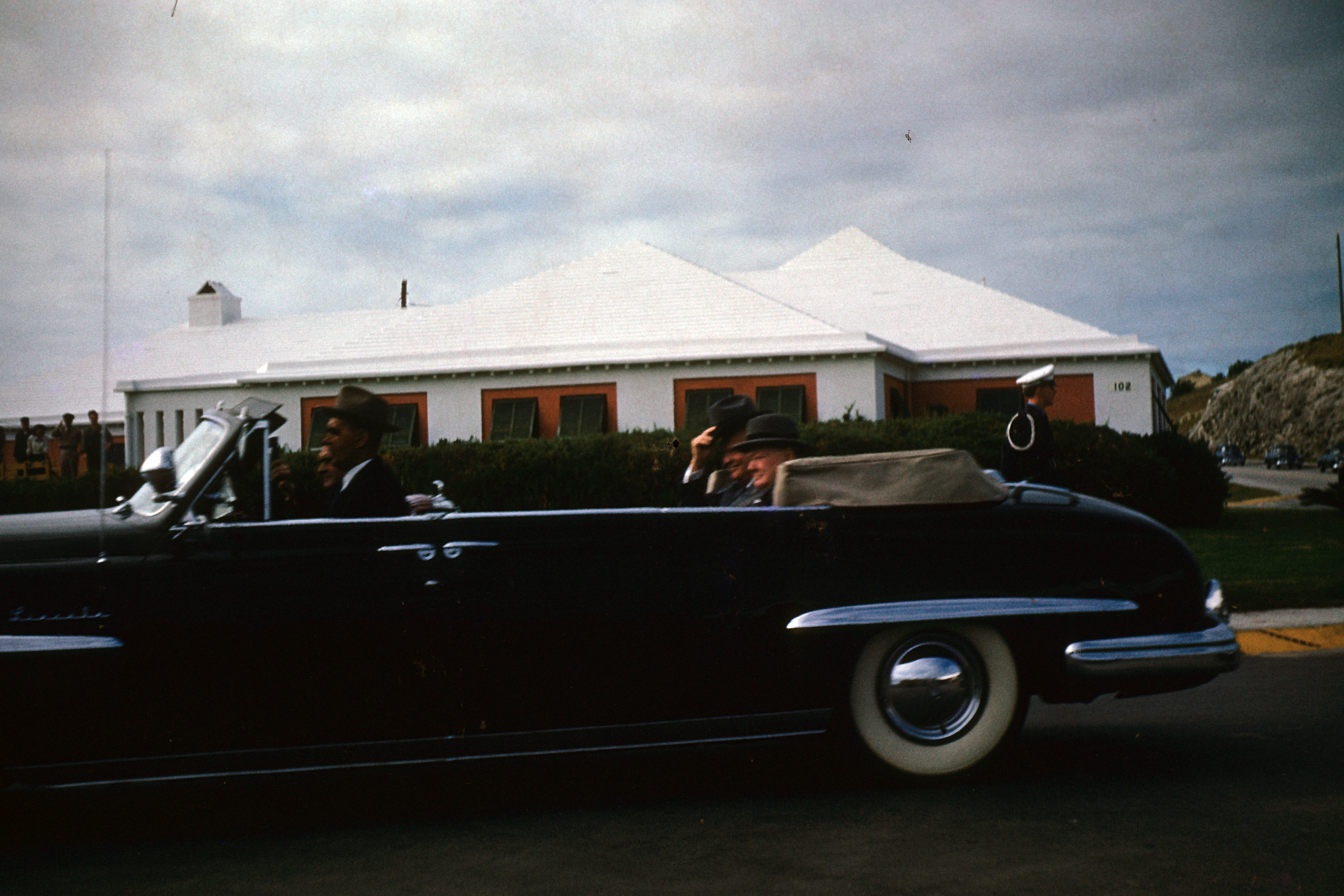
Winston Churchill hosted the Three-Powers Summit in 1953.

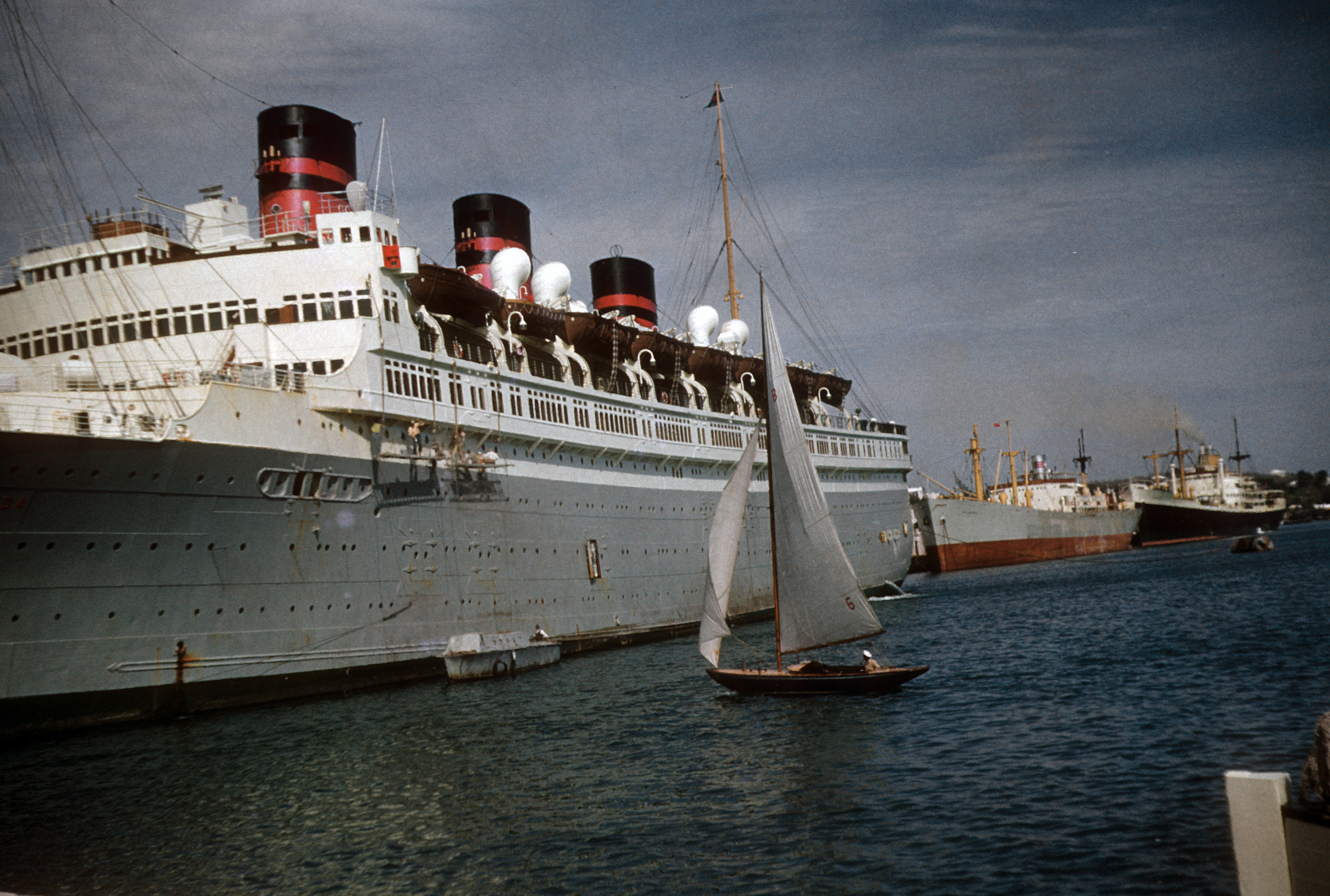
The SS Queen of Bermuda in Hamilton Harbour, c. Dec 1952 / Jan 1953

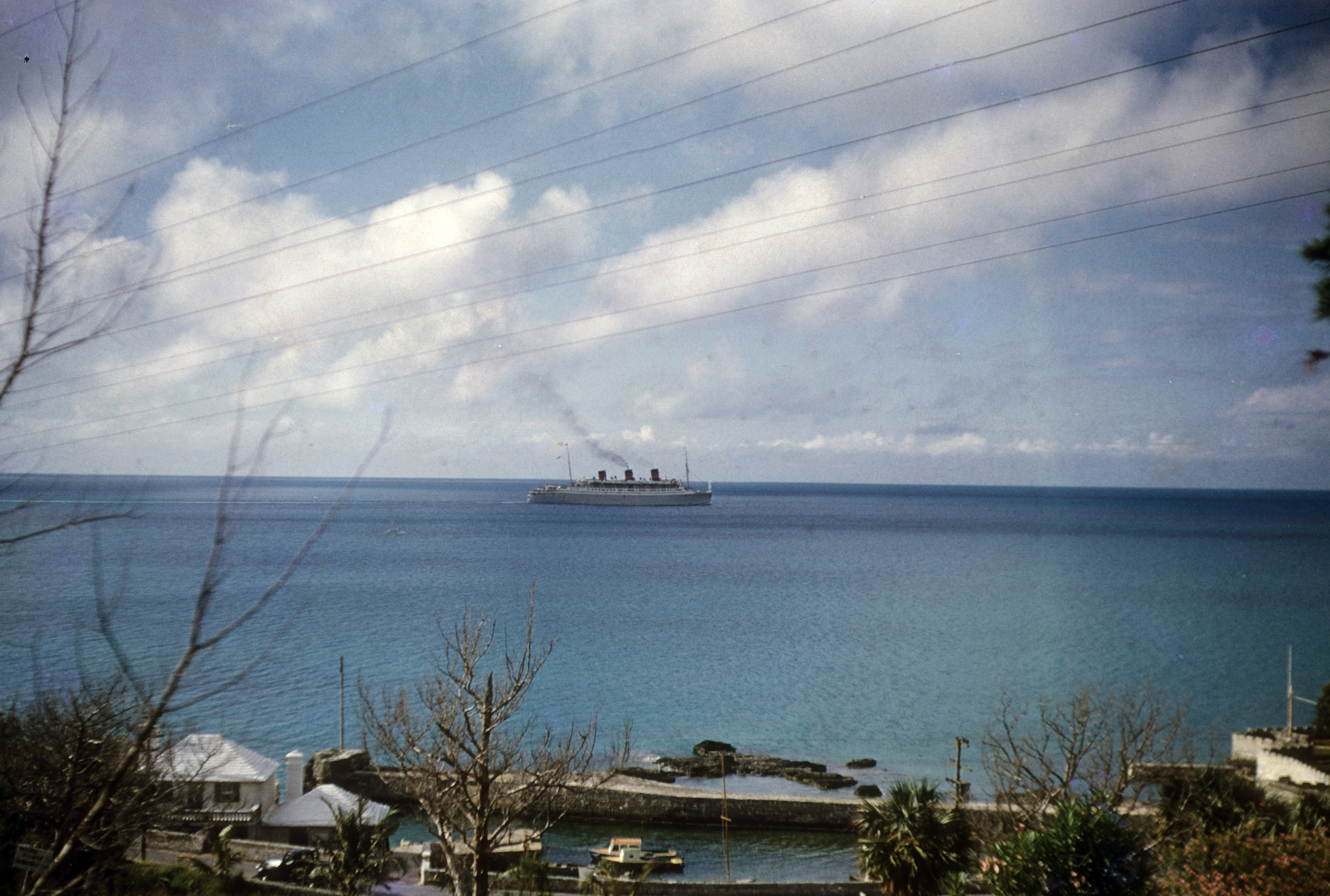
The S.S. Queen of Bermuda departing the island in December 1952~January 1953. The Devonshire Dock is in the foreground.

In the early 20th century, Bermuda became a popular destination for American, Canadian and British tourists arriving by sea. The US Smoot–Hawley Tariff Act of 1930, which enacted protectionist trade tariffs on goods imported into the US, led to the demise of Bermuda's once-thriving agricultural export trade to America and encouraged development of tourism as an alternative source of income. The island was one of the centres for illegal alcohol smuggling during the era of Prohibition in the United States (1920–1933).

A rail line was constructed in Bermuda in the 1920s, opening in 1931 as the Bermuda Railway and abandoned in 1948. The right of way is now the Bermuda Railway Trail.

In 1930, after several failed attempts, a Stinson Detroiter seaplane flew to Bermuda from New York City. It was the first aeroplane ever to reach the islands. In 1936 Deutsche Luft Hansa began to experiment with seaplane flights from Berlin via the Azores, with continuation flights to New York City.

In 1937 Imperial Airways and Pan American Airways began operating scheduled flying boat airline services from New York and Baltimore to Darrell's Island, Bermuda. In World War II the Hamilton Princess Hotel became a censorship centre. All mail, radio and telegraphic traffic bound for Europe, the US and the Far East was intercepted and analysed by 1,200 censors, of British Imperial Censorship, part of British Security Coordination (BSC), before being routed to their destination. With BSC working closely with the FBI, the censors were responsible for the discovery and arrest of a number of Axis spies operating in the US, including the Joe K ring.

In 1948 a regularly scheduled commercial airline service began to operate, using land-based aeroplanes landing at Kindley Field (now L.F. Wade International Airport), helping tourism to reach a peak in the 1960s and 1970s. By the end of the 1970s, however, international business had supplanted tourism as the dominant sector of Bermuda's economy.

The Royal Naval Dockyard and its attendant military garrison remained important to Bermuda's economy until the mid-20th century. In addition to considerable building work, the armed forces needed to source food and other materials from local vendors. Beginning in World War II, US military installations were also located in Bermuda, including a naval air station and submarine base. The American military presence lasted until 1995.

Universal adult suffrage and development of a two-party political system took place in the 1960s. Universal suffrage was adopted as part of Bermuda's Constitution in 1967; voting had previously been dependent on a certain level of property ownership.

On 10 March 1973 the governor of Bermuda, Richard Sharples, was assassinated by local Black Power militants during a period of civil unrest. Some moves were made towards possible independence for the islands but this was decisively rejected in a referendum in 1995.

At the 2020 Summer Olympics Bermuda became the smallest overseas territory to earn a gold medal when Flora Duffy won Bermuda's first ever Olympic gold medal in the women's triathlon.

== Geography ==
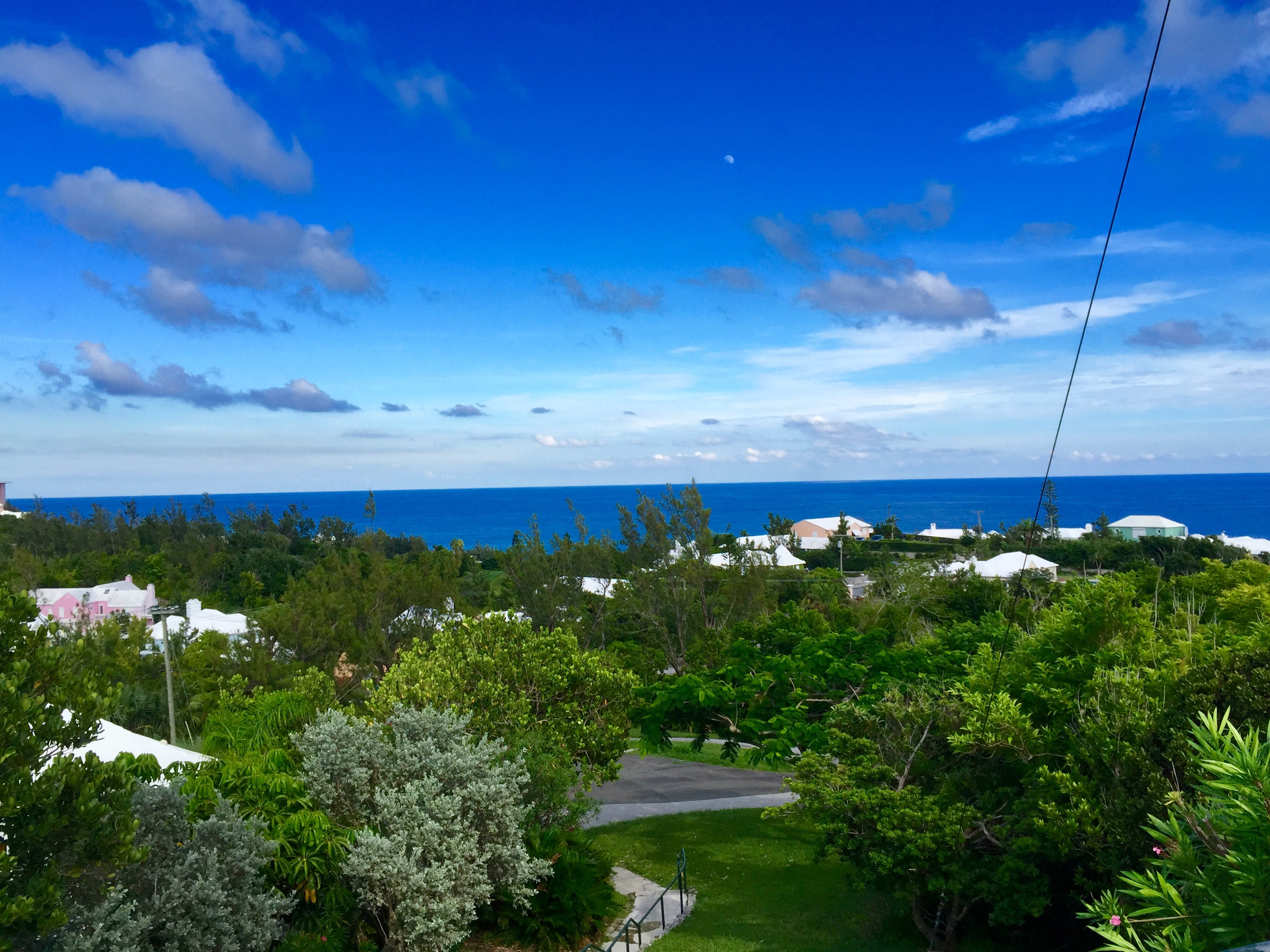
View of Bermuda from Gibbs Hill Lighthouse in July 2015

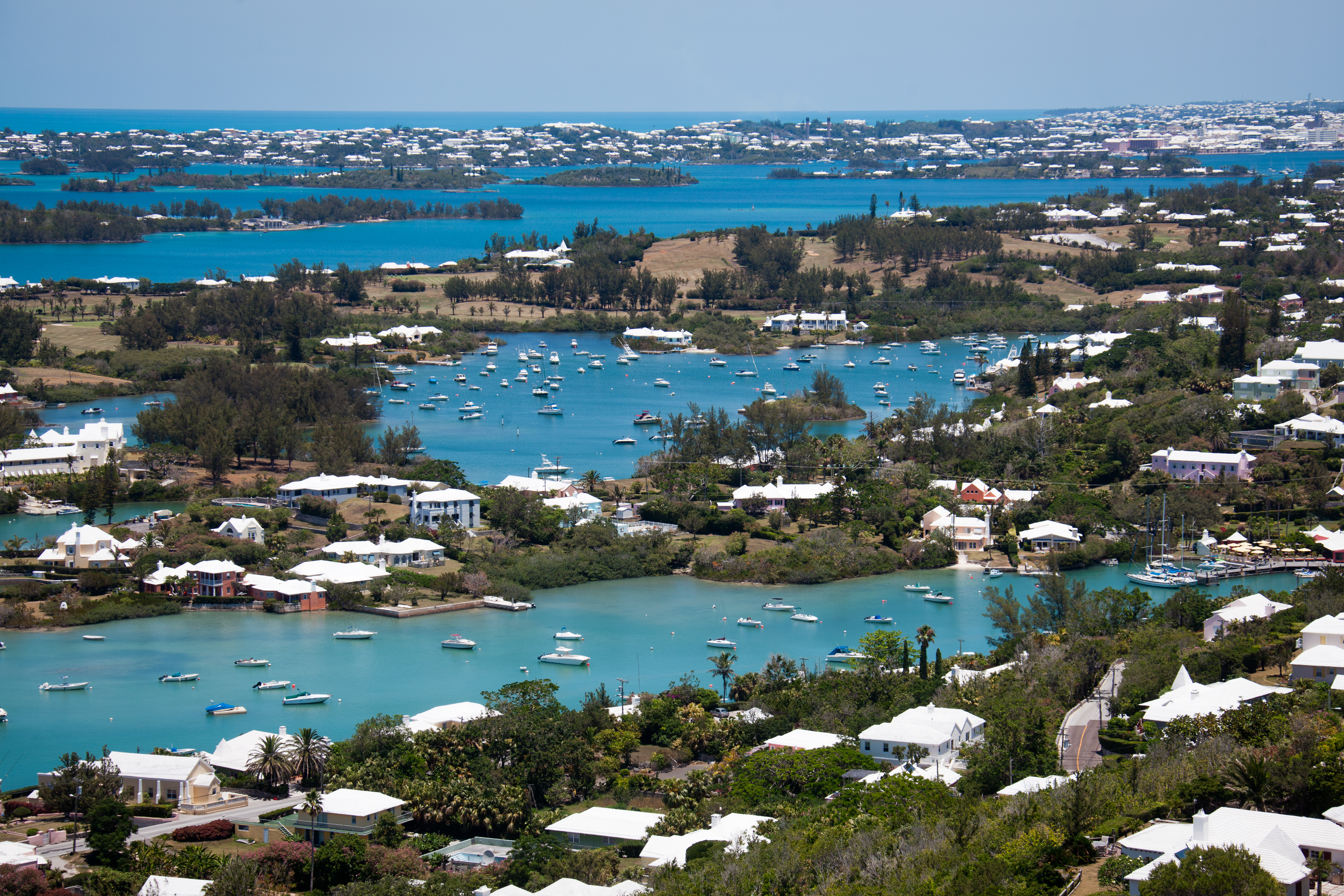
View from the top of Gibb's Hill Lighthouse

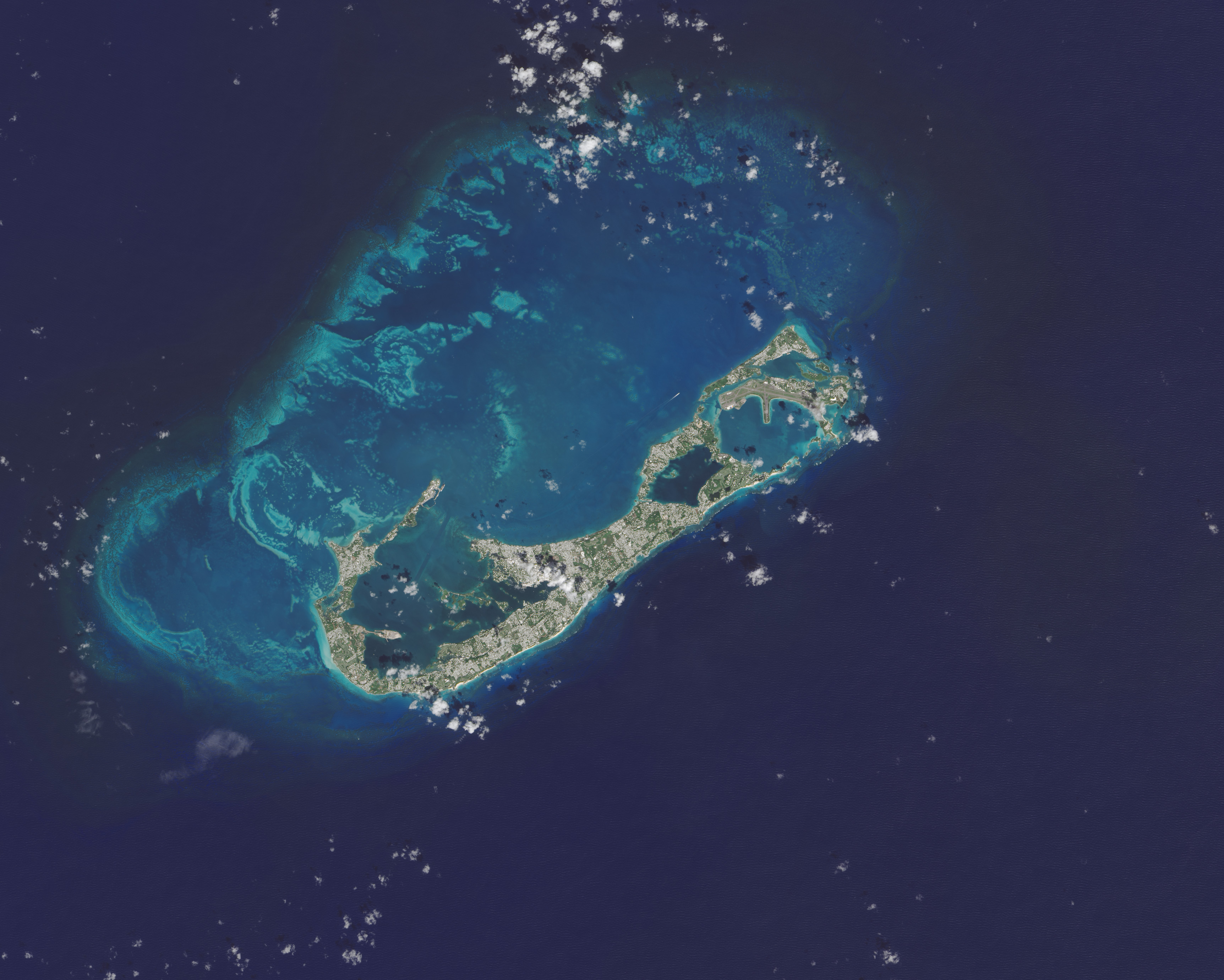
Landsat 8 satellite image

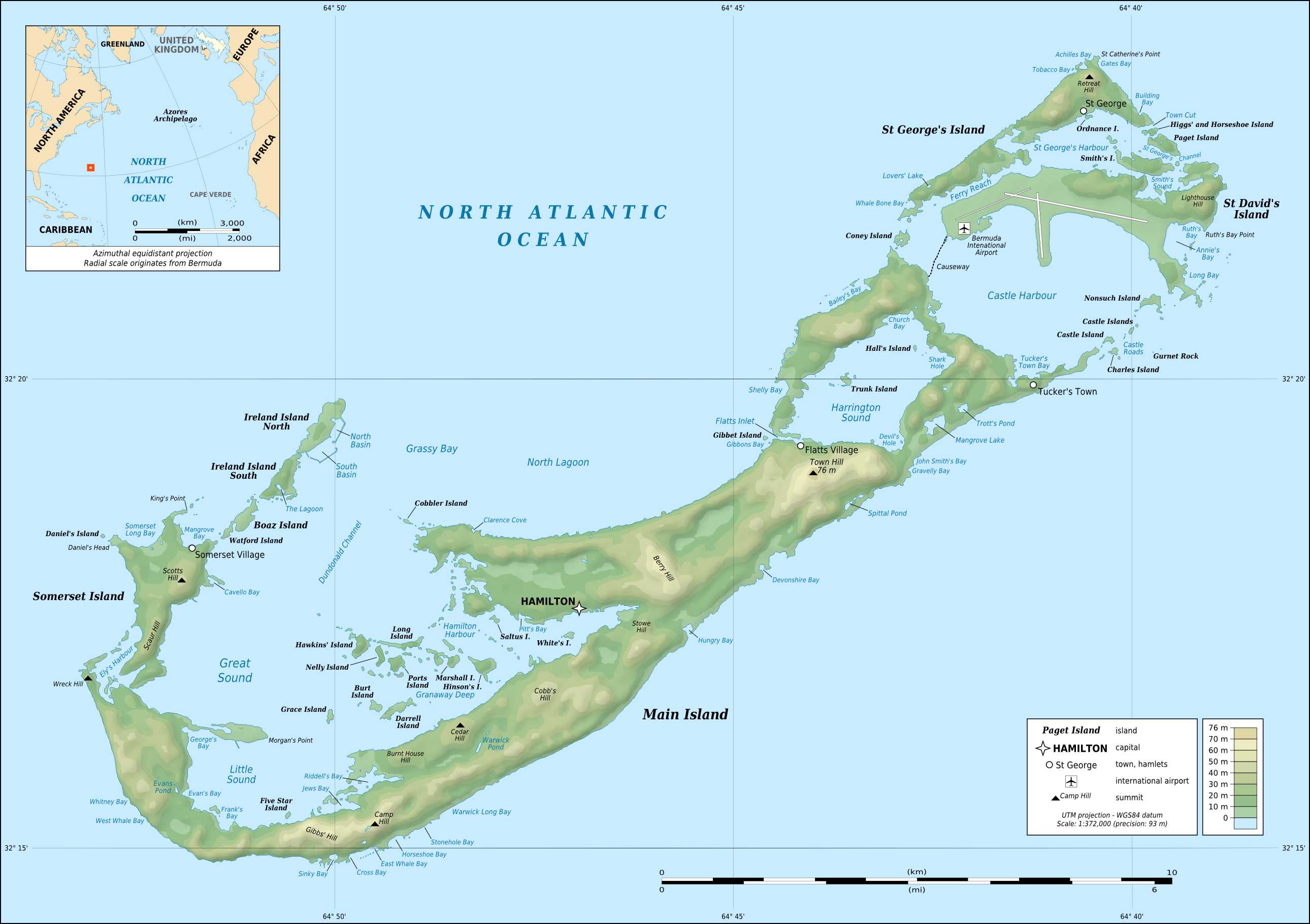
Topographic map of Bermuda

Bermuda is a group of low-forming volcanoes in the Atlantic Ocean, in the west of the Sargasso Sea, roughly 578 nmi (1,070 km; 665 mi) east-southeast of Cape Hatteras on the Outer Banks of North Carolina, United States which is the nearest landmass. Its next nearest neighbour is Cape Sable Island, Nova Scotia Canada which is 1,236 km (768 mi) north of Bermuda. It is also located 1,750 km (1,090 mi) south-southwest of Saint Pierre and Miquelon (France), 1,759 km (1,093 mi) north-northeast of Havana, Cuba, 1,538 km (956 mi) north of the British Virgin Islands, and 1,537.17 km (955.15 mi) north of San Juan, Puerto Rico.

The territory consists of 181 islands, with a total area of 53.3 km^{2} (20.6 sq mi). The largest island is Main Island (also called Bermuda). Eight larger and populated islands are connected by bridges. The territory's tallest peak is Town Hill on Main Island at 79 m (259 ft) tall. The territory's coastline is 103 km (64 mi).

=== Main sights ===
Bermuda's pink sand beaches and clear, cerulean blue ocean waters are popular with tourists. A number of Bermuda's hotels are located along the south shore of the island. In addition to its beaches, there are a number of sightseeing attractions. The historic Town of St. George's is a designated World Heritage Site. Scuba divers can explore a number of wrecks and coral reefs in relatively shallow water (typically 30–40 ft or 9–12 m in depth), with virtually unlimited visibility. A number of nearby reefs are readily accessible from shore by snorkellers, especially at Church Bay.

Bermuda's most popular visitor attraction is the Royal Naval Dockyard, which includes the National Museum of Bermuda. Other attractions include the Bermuda Aquarium, Museum and Zoo, the Bermuda Underwater Exploration Institute, the Bermuda Botanical Gardens, the Masterworks Museum of Bermuda Art, the Gibbs Hill Lighthouse, and the Crystal Caves with stalactites and underground saltwater pools. These limestone caves formed over millions of years. Michael K. Firth was inspired by Crystal Caves to create Fraggle Rock, the kids TV show. There is also a spa nearby inside Prospero's Cave, the Natura Spa at Grotto Bay Beach Resort & Spa. Somerset Bridge is the world's smallest drawbridge with just a 32-inch gap, and Horseshoe Bay and Warwick Long Bay are among the beautiful beaches in Bermuda.

Non-residents have traditionally been prohibited from driving cars on the island. Public transport and taxis are available and visitors can rent scooters (and more latterly small cars) for use as private transport.

=== Geology ===
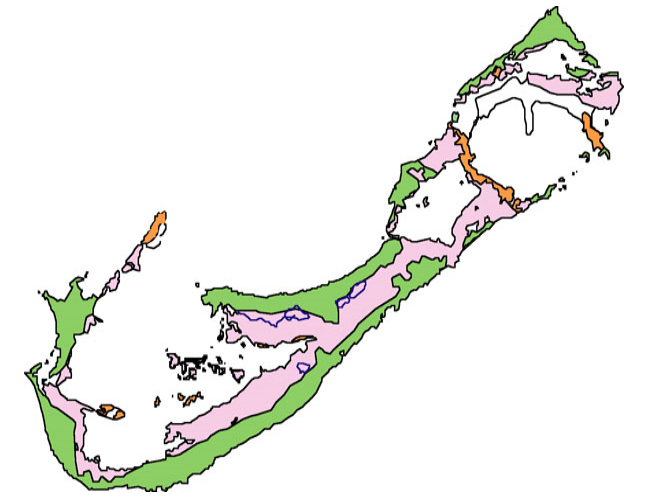
NOAA Ocean Explorer Bermuda Geologic Map, where red denotes the Walsingham Formation, purple denotes the Town Hill and Belmont Formations, green denotes the Rocky Bay and Southampton Formations, and white is infill associated with the airport

Bermuda consists of over 150 limestone islands, with five main islands along the southern margin of the Bermuda Platform, one of three topographic highs found on the Bermuda Pedestal. This Bermuda Pedestal sits atop the Bermuda Rise, a mid-basin swell surrounded by abyssal plains. The Bermuda Pedestal is one of four topographic highs aligned roughly from North-East to South-West. The others, all submerged, are Bowditch Seamount to the north-east, and Challenger Bank and Argus Bank to the south-west. Initial uplift of this rise occurred in the Middle to Late Eocene and concluded by the Late Oligocene, when it subsided below sea level. The volcanic rocks associated with this rise are tholeiitic lavas and intrusive lamprophyre sheets, which form a volcanic basement, on average, 50 m (160 ft) below the island carbonate surface.

The limestones of Bermuda consist of biocalcarenites with minor conglomerates. The portion of Bermuda above sea level consists of rocks deposited by aeolian processes, with a karst terrain. These eolianites are actually the type locality, and formed during interglaciations (i.e., the upper levels of the limestone cap, formed primarily by calcium-secreting algae, was broken down into sand by wave action during interglaciation when the seamount was submerged, and during glaciation, when the top of the seamount was above sea level, that sand was blown into dunes and fused together into a limestone sandstone), and are laced by red paleosols, also referred to as geosols or terra rossas, indicative of Saharan atmospheric dust and forming during glacial stages. The stratigraphic column starts with the Walsingham Formation, overlain by the Castle Harbour Geosol, the Lower and Upper Town Hill Formations separated by the Harbour Road Geosol, the Ord Road Geosol, the Belmont Formation, the Shore Hills Geosol, the Rocky Bay Formation, and the Southampton Formation.

The older eolianite ridges (older Bermuda) are more rounded and subdued compared to the outer coastline (Younger Bermuda). Thus, post deposition morphology includes chemical erosion, with inshore water bodies demonstrating that much of Bermuda is partially drowned Pleistocene karst. The Walsingham Formation is a clear example, constituting the cave district around Castle Harbour. The Upper Town Hill Formation forms the core of the Main Island, and prominent hills such as Town Hill, Knapton Hill, and St. David's Lighthouse, while the highest hills, Gibbs Hill Lighthouse, are due to the Southampton Formation.

Bermuda has two major aquifers: the Langton Aquifer located within the Southampton, Rocky Bay and Belmont Formations, and the Brighton Aquifer located within the Town Hill Formation. Four freshwater lenses occur in Bermuda, with the Central Lens being the largest on Main Island, containing an area of 7.2 km^{2} (1,800 acres) and a thickness greater than 10 m (33 ft).

=== Climate ===
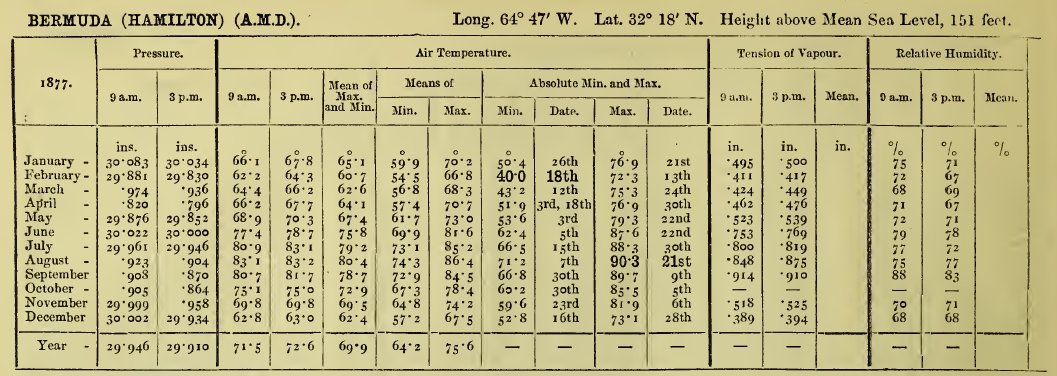
1877 Bermuda weather

Bermuda lies on the boundary of a humid subtropical climate (Köppen climate classification: Cfa), and a tropical rainforest climate (Köppen climate classification: Af). Bermuda's oceanic influence results in a more moderate climate, more similar to the western coast of Europe than on the eastern coast of North America, characterised by high relative humidity, which moderates temperature, ensuring generally mild winters and summers (by example, Glasgow, Scotland, at 55°51′40″ North, has an average winter temperature around 3 °Celsius, with temperatures as low as −8 °Celsius possible in December – its coldest month, while at about the same latitude, on the coast of Labrador, winter temperatures average −12 °Celsius, and can drop as low as −35 °Celsius. Lisbon, Portugal, and Princeton, New Jersey, at similar latitudes, have daily means in January of 11.8 °Celsius and −0.4 °Celsius, respectively).

Like western Europe, Bermuda is down wind of, and warmed by, the nearby Gulf Stream, with ocean temperatures warmer in winter than air temperatures, and heat radiated from the ocean into the atmosphere keeping air temperatures above freezing (this effect is more marked on the coastal areas, with lower elevations of inland valleys, such as Paget Marsh and Devonshire Marsh, often being distinctly cooler). The lowest temperatures are generally in February and March, not December and January, as the humidity generally causes a two-month lag between the winter solstice and the coldest point of the year (and also between the summer solstice and the warmest time of the year, July/August). January to March average 18 °C (64 °F). Pre-industrial temperatures at Bermuda, as globally, were lower than temperatures over the last century and a half, with Little Ice Ages that began about 1650, 1770, and 1850. Temperatures low enough for ice to form at ground level have not been recorded since the 19th Century (climate data for the first three centuries of Bermuda's settlement is not included in the dataset from which historical high or low temperatures for Bermuda are usually given, with the lowest temperature "since records began" consequently being 43.3 °Fahrenheit recorded on 26 February 1993, although the Royal Engineers kept detailed records of local weather for much of the 19th Century, which show a low of 34.0 °Fahrenheit on the 26 February 1880, at the City of Hamilton). Although precipitation at altitude does include snow, Bermuda's highest elevation is only 79 metres (259 ft) above sea level (at Town Hill), and snow always melts to become rain before it reaches ground level, unless circulating before falling as hail, which is common in winter (and has fallen thickly enough to form blankets over parts of the island that melt more slowly than snow would, as with the hail that fell on 26 February 1986). The hardiness zone is 11b/12a. In other words, the lowest that the annual minimum temperature may be expected to be is around 10 °C (50 °F). This is high for such a latitude and is a half-zone higher than the upper Florida Keys and Miami. Wind chill at Bermuda can be considerable, and can put the felt temperature below freezing even when the ambient temperature is well above.

The summertime heat index in Bermuda can be high, although mid-August temperatures rarely exceed 30 °C (86 °F). The highest recorded temperature was 34 °C (93 °F) in August 1989 (when Hurricane Dean drove hot air northwards to Bermuda). The average annual temperature of the Atlantic Ocean around Bermuda is 22.8 °C (73.0 °F), from 18.6 °C (65.5 °F) in February to 28.2 °C (82.8 °F) in August.

Bermuda is often in the direct path of hurricanes recurving in the westerlies, although they usually begin to weaken as they approach Bermuda, whose small size means that direct hurricane-strength landfalls are rare. Hurricane Emily was the first in three decades to strike Bermuda in 1987. The most recent hurricanes to cause significant damage to Bermuda were Category 2 Hurricane Gonzalo on 18 October 2014 and Category 3 Hurricane Nicole on 14 October 2016, both of which struck the island direct. Category 2 Hurricane Paulette directly hit the island in 2020. Before that, Hurricane Fabian on 5 September 2003 was the last major hurricane to hit Bermuda directly, with wind speeds of over 120 mph (190 km/h), category 3). The most recent tropical cyclone to directly hit the island was Hurricane Ernesto as a weakening Category 1 storm on 17 August 2024.

With no rivers or freshwater lakes, the only source of fresh water is rainfall, which is collected on roofs and catchments (or drawn from underground lenses) and stored in tanks. Each dwelling usually has at least one of these tanks forming part of its foundation. The law requires that each household collect rainwater that is piped down from the roof of each house. Average monthly rainfall is highest in October, at over 6 in (150 mm), and lowest in April and May.

Access to biocapacity in Bermuda is much lower than world average. In 2016, Bermuda had 0.14 global hectares of biocapacity per person within its territory, far lower than the world average of 1.6 global hectares per person. In 2016 Bermuda used 7.5 global hectares of biocapacity per person – their ecological footprint of consumption. This means they use much more biocapacity than Bermuda contains. As a result, Bermuda runs a biocapacity deficit.

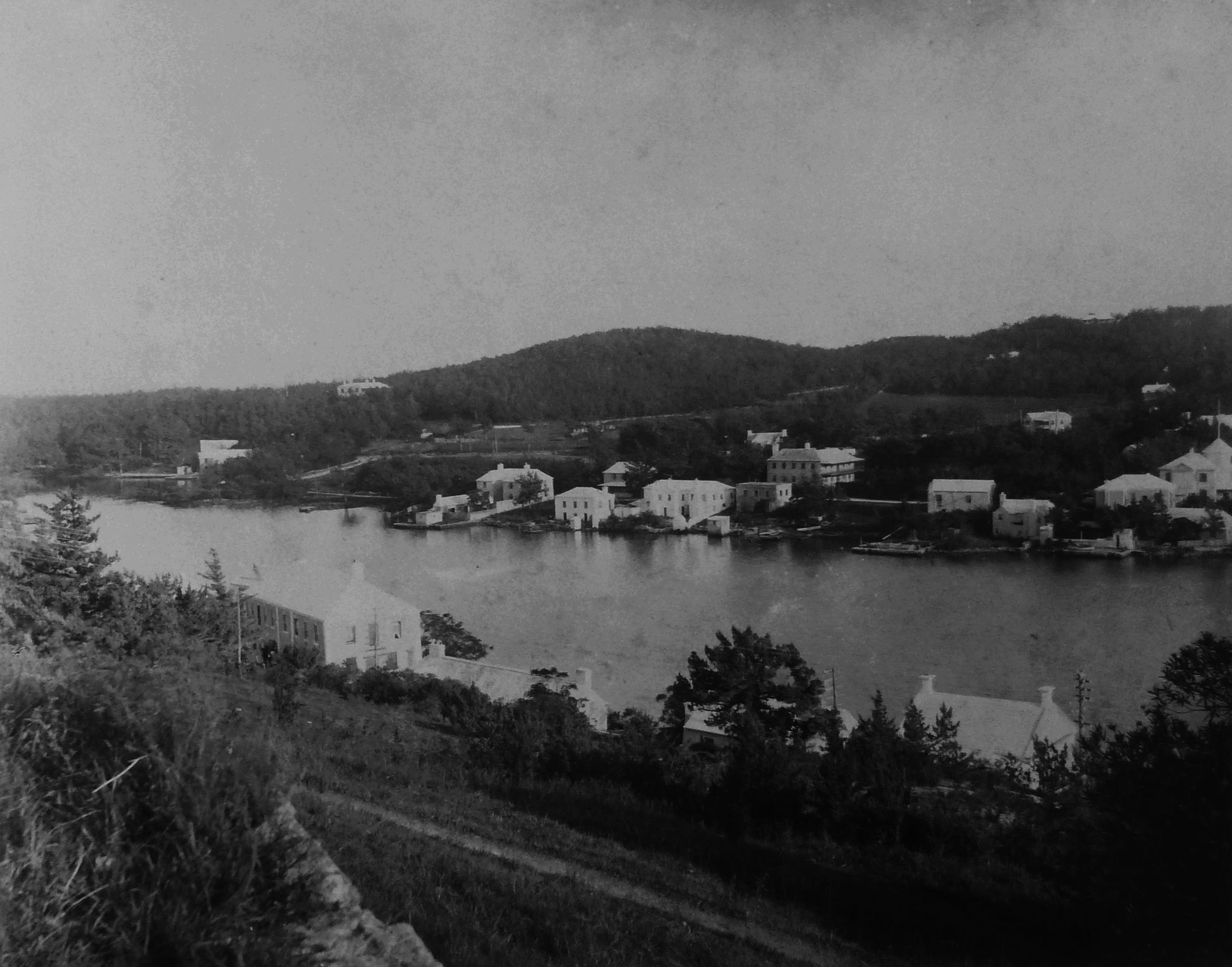
1904 view across Hamilton Harbour from Fort Hamilton of cedar-cloaked hills in Paget Parish

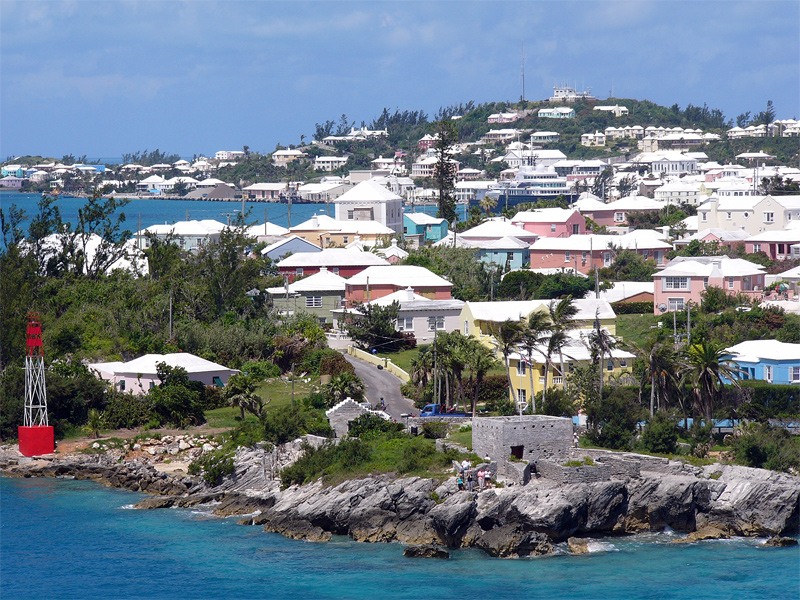
Residential suburb near the old St. George's Garrison, with "Town Cut Battery" or "Gate's Fort" on the shore of the Town Cut, and St. George's Town and its harbour in the background

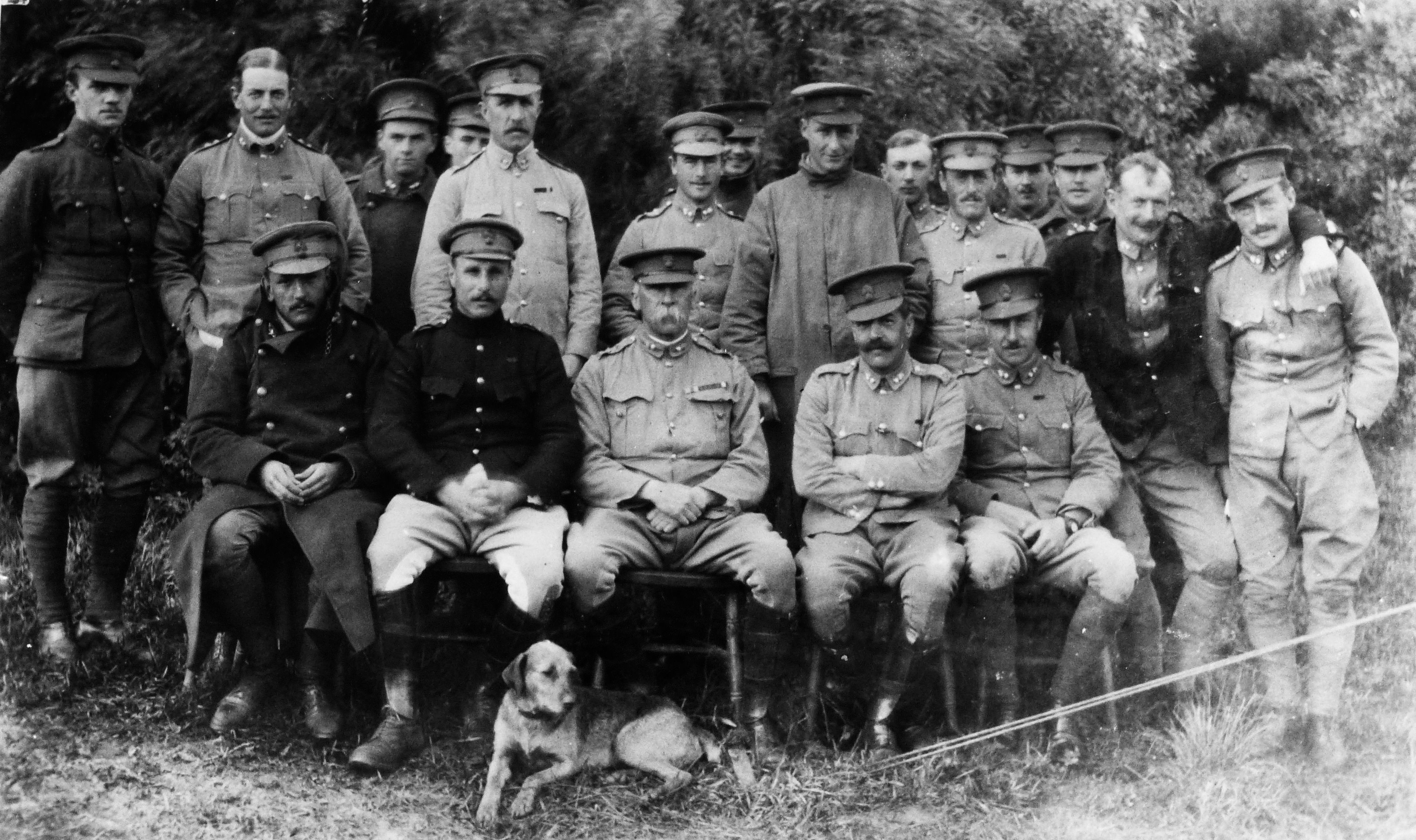
Officers of 3rd Battalion, The Royal Fusiliers (City of London Regiment), at Battalion Training at Tucker's Town, Bermuda, 1905. Bermuda's climate means heavier temperate uniforms are worn by armed forces and police personnel for much of the year.

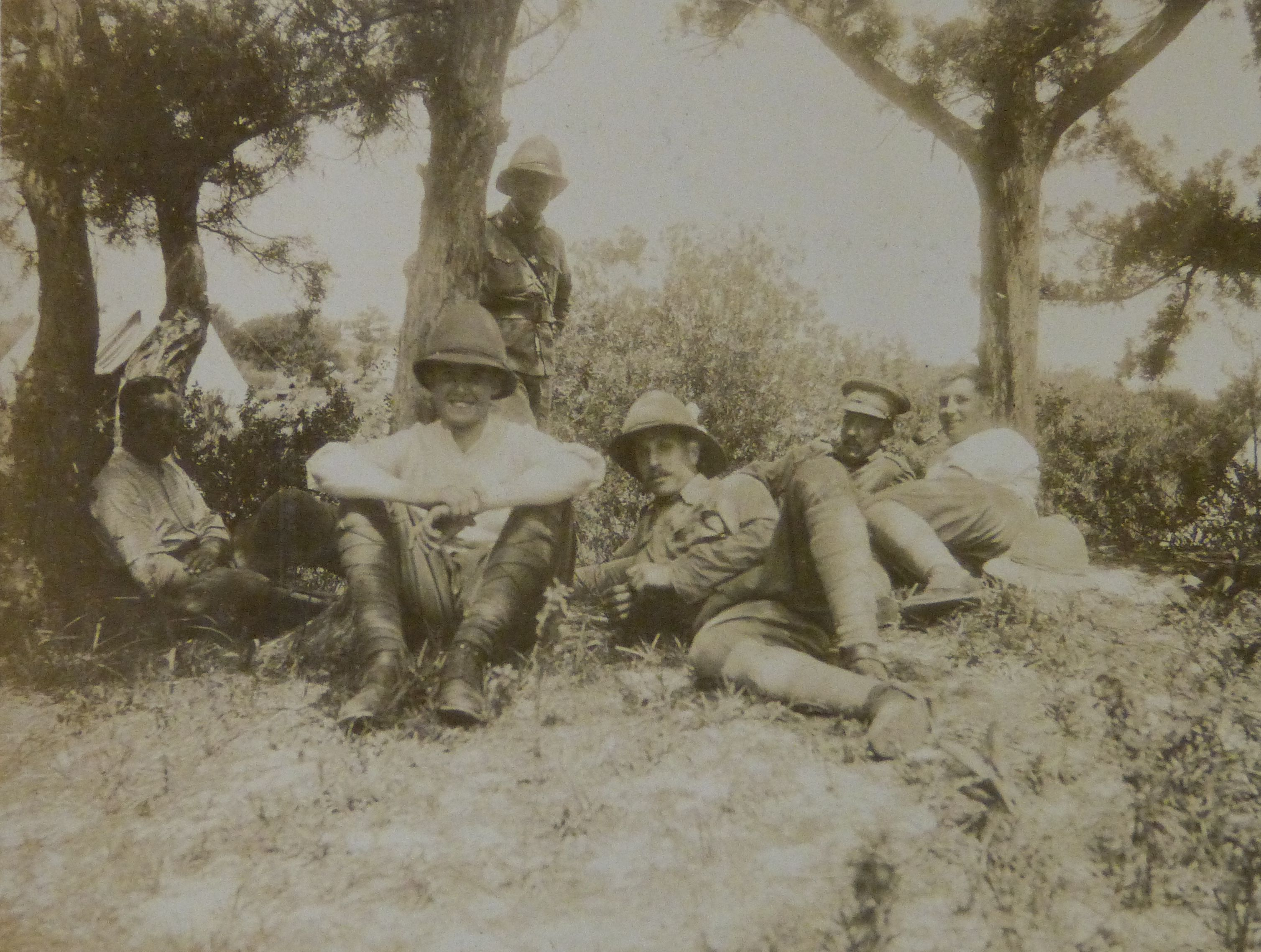
Battalion Training at Tucker's Town Bermuda of the 3rd Battalion Royal Fusiliers, wearing lightweight khaki drills, intended as a warm climate uniform, as a summer uniform

Climate data for Bermuda (L.F. Wade International Airport) (1991–2020 normals, extremes 1949–2023) (Note: Mean monthly maxima and minima (i.e. the highest and lowest temperature readings during an entire month or year) calculated based on data at said location from 2006 to 2023.)
Month	Jan	Feb	Mar	Apr	May	Jun	Jul	Aug	Sep	Oct	Nov	Dec	Year
Record high °C (°F)	25.4 (77.7)	26.1 (79.0)	26.1 (79.0)	27.2 (81.0)	30.0 (86.0)	32.2 (90.0)	33.1 (91.6)	33.9 (93.0)	33.2 (91.8)	31.7 (89.0)	28.9 (84.0)	26.7 (80.0)	33.9 (93.0)
Mean maximum °C (°F)	23.4 (74.1)	23.1 (73.6)	23.5 (74.3)	24.4 (75.9)	26.5 (79.7)	29.1 (84.4)	30.7 (87.3)	31.2 (88.2)	30.6 (87.1)	28.9 (84.0)	26.3 (79.3)	24.5 (76.1)	31.3 (88.3)
Mean daily maximum °C (°F)	20.7 (69.3)	20.4 (68.7)	20.5 (68.9)	22.1 (71.8)	24.3 (75.7)	27.2 (81.0)	29.6 (85.3)	30.1 (86.2)	29.1 (84.4)	26.7 (80.1)	23.8 (74.8)	21.8 (71.2)	24.7 (76.5)
Daily mean °C (°F)	18.3 (64.9)	18.0 (64.4)	18.1 (64.6)	19.7 (67.5)	22.0 (71.6)	25.0 (77.0)	27.2 (81.0)	27.7 (81.9)	26.7 (80.1)	24.4 (75.9)	21.6 (70.9)	19.6 (67.3)	22.4 (72.3)
Mean daily minimum °C (°F)	15.9 (60.6)	15.4 (59.7)	15.6 (60.1)	17.3 (63.1)	19.8 (67.6)	22.7 (72.9)	24.9 (76.8)	25.2 (77.4)	24.4 (75.9)	22.2 (72.0)	19.3 (66.7)	17.3 (63.1)	20.0 (68.0)
Mean minimum °C (°F)	11.5 (52.7)	11.6 (52.9)	11.4 (52.5)	14.0 (57.2)	16.3 (61.3)	19.4 (66.9)	21.7 (71.1)	22.5 (72.5)	21.4 (70.5)	19.0 (66.2)	15.9 (60.6)	13.6 (56.5)	10.2 (50.4)
Record low °C (°F)	7.2 (45.0)	6.3 (43.3)	7.2 (45.0)	8.9 (48.0)	12.1 (53.8)	15.2 (59.4)	16.1 (61.0)	20.0 (68.0)	18.9 (66.0)	14.4 (58.0)	12.4 (54.3)	9.1 (48.4)	6.3 (43.3)
Average precipitation mm (inches)	127.6 (5.02)	123.6 (4.87)	118.9 (4.68)	86.8 (3.42)	94.6 (3.72)	110.2 (4.34)	116.2 (4.57)	165.2 (6.50)	145.2 (5.72)	149.1 (5.87)	111.6 (4.39)	104.8 (4.13)	1,453.8 (57.23)
Average precipitation days (≥ 1 mm)	13.8	12.6	12.2	8.9	7.8	9.9	10.7	13.2	11.6	12.1	11.8	11.7	136.3
Average relative humidity (%)	73	73	73	74	79	81	80	79	77	74	72	72	76
Average dew point °C (°F)	13.4 (56.1)	13.3 (55.9)	12.9 (55.2)	15.2 (59.4)	17.7 (63.9)	21.1 (70.0)	22.8 (73.0)	23.1 (73.6)	22.2 (72.0)	19.8 (67.6)	16.6 (61.9)	14.6 (58.3)	17.7 (63.9)
Mean monthly sunshine hours	143.2	147.6	189.7	231.9	255.9	255.6	284.6	272.7	221.8	198.3	168.0	146.6	2,515.9
Source: Bermuda Weather Service (mean max and min 2006–2023, humidity 1995–2010, dew point 2002–2018, sun 1999–2019)

=== Flora and fauna ===
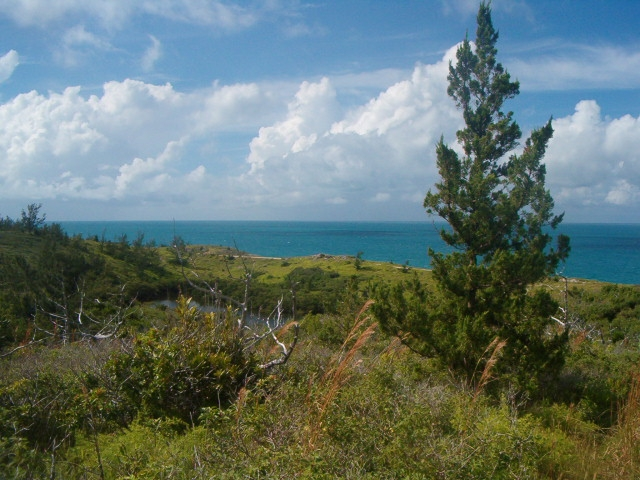
Young Bermuda cedar tree at Ferry Reach

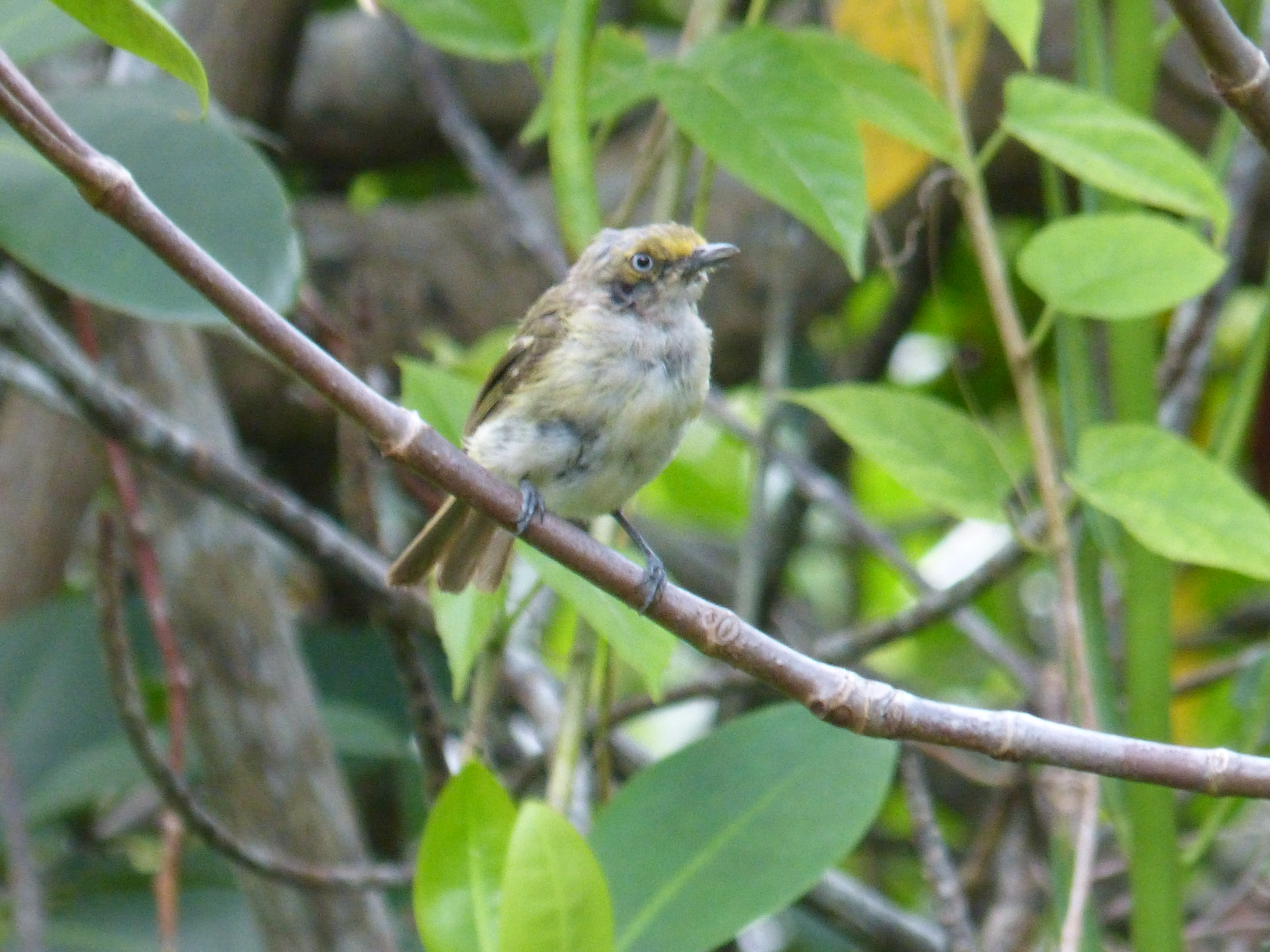
White-eyed vireo (Vireo griseus bermudianus)

When discovered, Bermuda was uninhabited by humans and mostly dominated by forests of Bermuda cedar, with mangrove marshes along its shores. Forest cover is around 20% of the total land area, equivalent to 1,000 hectares (ha) of forest in 2020, unchanged from 1990.

Only 165 of the island's current 1,000 vascular plant species are considered native; fifteen of those, including the eponymous cedar, are endemic. The tropical climate of Bermuda allowed settlers to introduce several non-native species of tree and plant to the island. Today several types of palm tree, fruit tree and banana grow on Bermuda, though the cultivated coconut palms are considered non-native and may be removed. The country contains the Bermuda subtropical conifer forests terrestrial ecoregion.

The only indigenous mammals of Bermuda are five species of bat, all of which are also found in the eastern United States: the silver-haired bat Lasionycteris noctivagans, eastern red bat Lasiurus borealis, hoary bat Lasiurus cinereus, Seminole bat Lasiurus seminolus and tricolored bat Perimyotis subflavus. Other commonly known fauna of Bermuda include its national bird, the Bermuda petrel or cahow, which was rediscovered in 1951 after having been thought extinct since the 1620s. The cahow is important as an example of a Lazarus species, hence the government has a programme to protect it, including restoration of its habitat areas. Another well-known species includes the white-tailed tropicbird, locally known as the longtail. These birds come inland to breed in February and March and are Bermudians' first sign of spring.

The Bermuda rock lizard (or Bermuda rock skink) was long thought to have been the only indigenous non-bird land vertebrate of Bermuda, discounting the marine turtles that lay their eggs on its beaches. However scientists have recently discovered through genetic DNA studies that a species of turtle, the diamondback terrapin, previously thought to have been introduced to the archipelago, actually pre-dated the arrival of humans.

Only three bee species have been recorded on Bermuda. The western honey bee Apis mellifera was introduced by English colonists around 1616, marking the beginning of beekeeping's cultural significance on the island. A second species, the sweat bee Lasioglossum semiviridie, was last recorded in 1922. Recent DNA analysis has revealed that the leafcutter bee Megachile pruina in Bermuda constitutes a unique evolutionary lineage, distinct from M. pruina populations in the United States.

== Government and politics ==
Charles III
King

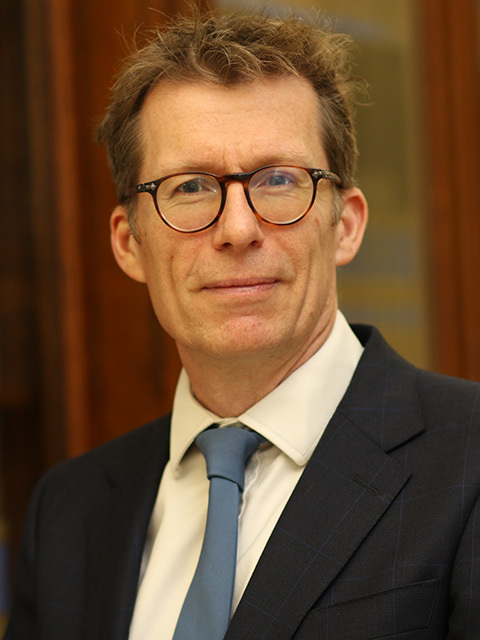
Andrew Murdoch
Governor

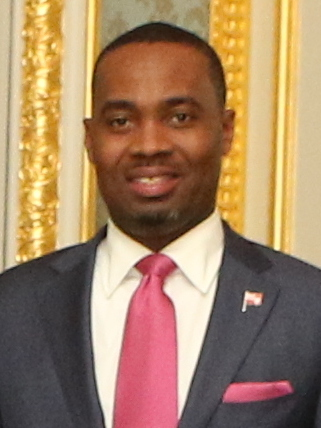
David Burt
Premier

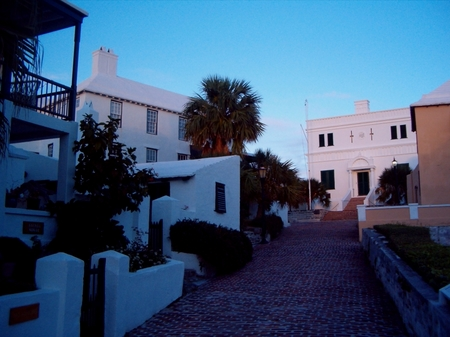
The State House in St. George's, the home of Bermuda's parliament between 1620 and 1815

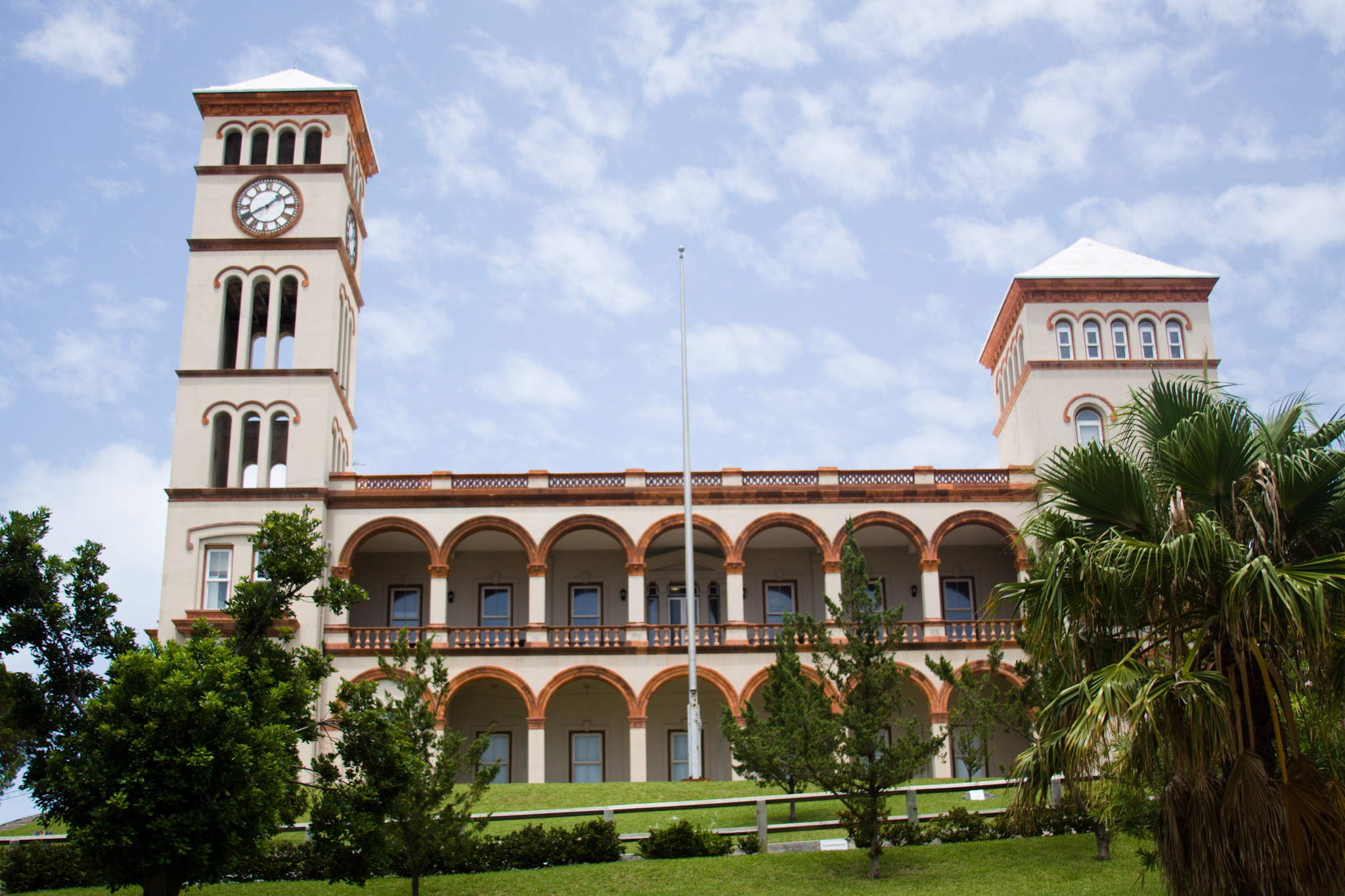
The Sessions House in Hamilton, current home of the House of Assembly and the Supreme Court

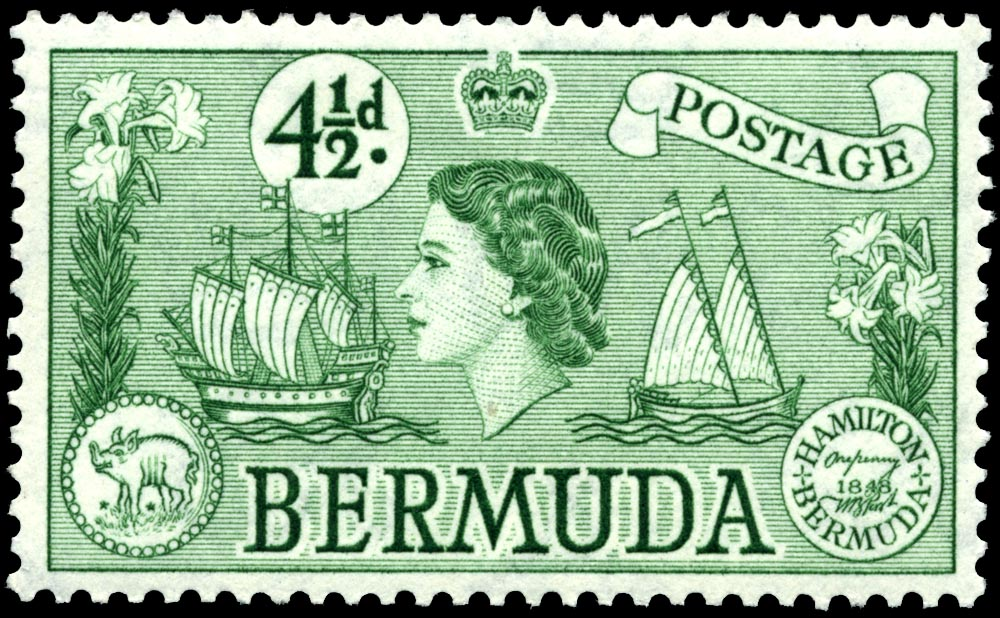
Queen Elizabeth II on a 1953 Bermudian stamp

Bermuda is an Overseas Territory of the United Kingdom, and the Government of the United Kingdom is the sovereign government. Executive authority in Bermuda is vested in the British monarch (currently Charles III) and is exercised on his behalf by the governor of Bermuda. The governor is appointed by the king on the advice of the British Government. Since January 2025, the governor is Andrew Murdoch; he was sworn in on 23 January 2025. There is also a deputy governor (currently Tom Oppenheim).

Defence, trade and foreign affairs are the responsibility of the United Kingdom, which also retains responsibility to ensure good government and must approve any changes to the Constitution of Bermuda. Bermuda is Britain's oldest overseas territory. Although the UK Parliament retains ultimate legislative authority over the territory, in 1620, a Royal Proclamation granted Bermuda limited self-governance, delegating to the House of Assembly of the Parliament of Bermuda the internal legislation of the colony. The Parliament of Bermuda is the fifth oldest legislature in the world, behind the Sejm of Poland, the Parliament of England, the Tynwald of the Isle of Man, and the Althing of Iceland.

The Constitution of Bermuda came into force in 1968 and has been amended several times since then. The head of government is the premier of Bermuda; a cabinet is nominated by the premier and appointed officially by the governor. The legislative branch consists of a bicameral parliament modelled on the Westminster system. The Senate is the upper house, consisting of 11 members appointed by the governor on the advice of the premier and the leader of the opposition. The House of Assembly, or lower house, has 36 members, elected by the eligible voting populace in secret ballot to represent geographically defined constituencies.

Elections for the Parliament of Bermuda must be called at no more than five-year intervals. The most recent took place on 18 February 2025. Following this election, the Progressive Labour Party held onto power, with Edward David Burt sworn in as Premier for the third time.

There are few accredited diplomats in Bermuda. The United States maintains the largest diplomatic mission in Bermuda, comprising both the United States Consulate and the US Customs and Border Protection Services at the L.F. Wade International Airport. The United States is Bermuda's largest trading partner (providing over 71% of total imports, 85% of tourist visitors, and an estimated $163 billion of US capital in the Bermuda insurance/re-insurance industry). According to the 2016 Bermuda census 5.6% of Bermuda residents were born in the US, representing over 18% of all foreign-born people.

=== Nationality and citizenship ===
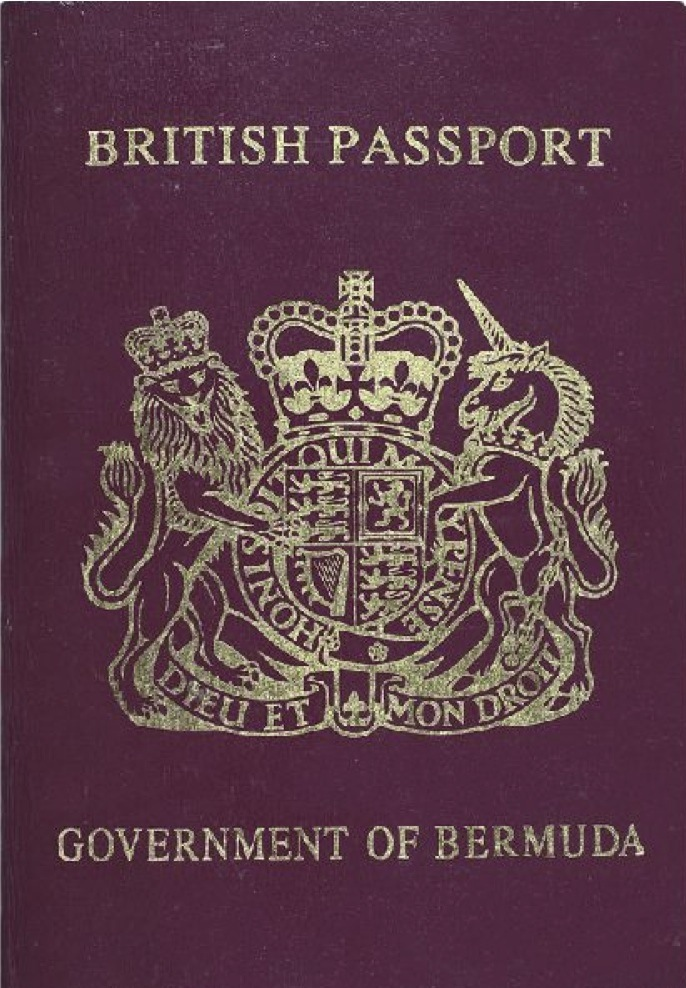
A British passport as issued by the Department of Immigration of the Government of Bermuda on behalf of the Passport Office of the Government of the United Kingdom, and often erroneously described as a Bermudian passport

Citizenship rights were granted by royal charters at the founding of the colony. Bermuda (fully The Somers Isles or Islands of Bermuda) had been settled by the London Company (which had been in occupation of the archipelago since the 1609 wreck of the Sea Venture) in 1612, when it received its third royal charter from King James I, amending the boundaries of the First Colony of Virginia far enough across the Atlantic to include Bermuda. The citizenship rights guaranteed to settlers by King James I in the original royal charter of 10 April 1606, thereby applied to Bermudians:

Alsoe wee doe, for us, our heires and successors, declare by theise presentes that all and everie the parsons being our subjects which shall dwell and inhabit within everie or anie of the saide severall Colonies and plantacions and everie of theire children which shall happen to be borne within the limitts and precincts of the said severall Colonies and plantacions shall have and enjoy all liberties, franchises and immunites within anie of our other dominions to all intents and purposes as if they had been abiding and borne within this our realme of Englande or anie other of our saide dominions.

These rights were confirmed in the royal charter granted to the London Company's spin-off, the Company of the City of London for the Plantacion of The Somers Isles, in 1615 on Bermuda being separated from Virginia:

And wee doe for vs our heires and successors declare by these Pnts, that all and euery persons being our subjects which shall goe and inhabite within the said Somer Ilandes and every of their children and posterity which shall happen to bee borne within the limits thereof shall haue and enjoy all libertyes franchesies and immunities of free denizens and natural subjectes within any of our dominions to all intents and purposes, as if they had beene abiding and borne within this our Kingdome of England or in any other of our Dominions

Bermudians now hold British Overseas Territories citizenship.

=== Administrative divisions ===
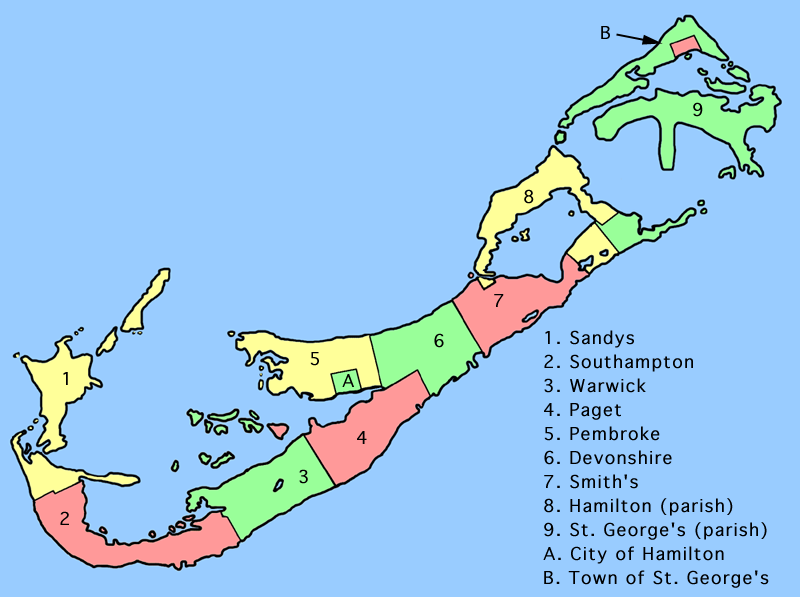
Parishes of Bermuda

Bermuda is divided into nine parishes and two incorporated municipalities.

Bermuda's nine parishes are:

- Devonshire
- Hamilton
- Paget
- Pembroke
- Sandys
- Smith's
- Southampton
- St George's
- Warwick

Bermuda's two incorporated municipalities are:

- Hamilton (city)
- St George's (town)

Bermuda's two informal villages are:

- Flatts Village
- Somerset Village

Jones Village in Warwick, Cashew City (St. George's), Claytown (Hamilton), Middle Town (Pembroke), and Tucker's Town (St. George's) are neighbourhoods (the original settlement at Tucker's Town was replaced with a golf course in the 1920s and the few houses in the area today are mostly on the water's edge of Castle Harbour or the adjacent peninsula); Dandy Town and North Village are sports clubs, and Harbour View Village is a small public housing development.

=== International relations ===
As a British Overseas Territory, Bermuda does not have a seat in the United Nations; it is represented by Britain in matters of foreign affairs. To promote its economic interests abroad, Bermuda maintains representative offices in London and Washington, D.C. Only the United States and Portugal have full-time diplomatic representation in Bermuda (the US maintains a Consulate-General, and Portugal maintains a Consulate), while 17 countries maintain honorary consuls in Bermuda.

Bermuda's proximity to the US had made it attractive as the site for summit conferences between British prime ministers and US presidents. The first summit was held in December 1953, at the insistence of Prime Minister Winston Churchill, to discuss relations with the Soviet Union during the Cold War. Participants included Churchill, US president Dwight D. Eisenhower and French premier Joseph Laniel.

In 1957 a second summit conference was held. The British prime minister, Harold Macmillan, arrived earlier than President Eisenhower, to demonstrate they were meeting on British territory, as tensions were still high regarding the previous year's conflict over the Suez Canal. Macmillan returned in 1961 for the third summit with President John F. Kennedy. The meeting was called to discuss Cold War tensions arising from construction of the Berlin Wall.

The most recent summit conference in Bermuda between the two powers occurred in 1990, when British prime minister Margaret Thatcher met US president George H. W. Bush.

Direct meetings between the president of the United States and the premier of Bermuda have been rare. The most recent meeting was on 23 June 2008, between Premier Ewart Brown and President George W. Bush. Prior to this, the leaders of Bermuda and the United States had not met at the White House since a 1996 meeting between Premier David Saul and President Bill Clinton.

Bermuda has also joined several other jurisdictions in efforts to protect the Sargasso Sea.

In 2013 and 2017 Bermuda chaired the United Kingdom Overseas Territories Association.

==== Asylum offer to four former Guantánamo detainees ====
On 11 June 2009, four Uyghurs who had been held in the United States Guantánamo Bay detention camp, in Cuba, were transferred to Bermuda. The four men were among 22 Uyghurs who claimed to be refugees who were captured in 2001 in Pakistan after fleeing the American aerial bombardment of Afghanistan. They were accused of training to assist the Taliban's military. They were cleared as safe for release from Guantánamo in 2005 or 2006, but US domestic law prohibited deporting them back to China, their country of citizenship, because the US government determined that China was likely to violate their human rights.

In September 2008, the men were cleared of all suspicion and Judge Ricardo Urbina in Washington ordered their release. Congressional opposition to their admittance to the United States was strong and the US failed to find a home for them until Bermuda and Palau agreed to accept the 22 men in June 2009.

The secret bilateral discussions that led to prisoner transfers between the US and the devolved Bermuda government sparked diplomatic ire from the United Kingdom, which was not consulted on the move despite Bermuda being a British territory. The British Foreign Office issued the following statement:

We've underlined to the Bermuda Government that they should have consulted with the United Kingdom as to whether this falls within their competence or is a security issue, for which the Bermuda Government do not have delegated responsibility. We have made clear to the Bermuda Government the need for a security assessment, which we are now helping them to carry out, and we will decide on further steps as appropriate.

In August 2018, the four Uyghurs were granted limited citizenship in Bermuda. The men now have the same rights as Bermudians except the right to vote.

==== British North America, British West Indies and the Caribbean Community ====
The British Government originally grouped Bermuda with North America (given its proximity, and Bermuda having been established as an extension of the Colony of Virginia, and with Carolina Colony, the nearest landfall, having been settled from Bermuda). After the acknowledgement by the British Government of the independence of thirteen continental colonies (including Virginia and the Carolinas) in 1783, Bermuda was generally grouped regionally by the British Government with The Maritimes and Newfoundland and Labrador (and more widely, as part of British North America), substantially nearer to Bermuda than is the Caribbean.

From 1783 through 1801, the British Empire, including British North America, was administered by the Home Office and by the Home Secretary, then from 1801 to 1854 by the War Office (which became the War and Colonial Office) and Secretary of State for War and Colonies (as the Secretary of State for War was renamed). From 1824, the British Empire was divided by the War and Colonial Office into four administrative departments, including North America, the West Indies, Mediterranean and Africa, and Eastern Colonies, of which the North American department included Bermuda. The Colonial Office and War Office, the Secretary of State for the Colonies and the Secretary of State for War, were all separated in 1854. The War Office, from then until the 1867 confederation of the Dominion of Canada, split the military administration of the British colonial and foreign stations into nine districts with North America and North Atlantic including the station of Bermuda. The Colonial Office, by 1862, oversaw eight Colonies in British North America, which included Bermuda separately. By 1867, administration of the South Atlantic Ocean archipelago of the Falkland Islands, which had been colonised in 1833, had been added to the remit of the North American Department of the Colonial Office. Following the 1867 confederation of most of the British North American colonies to form the Dominion of Canada while Bermuda and Newfoundland remained as the only British colonies in North America (although the Falkland Islands also continued to be administered by the North American Department of the Colonial Office). The reduction of the territory administered by the British Government would result in re-organisation of the Colonial Office. In 1901, the departments of the Colonial Office included the North American and Australasian department to which Bermuda was a part. In 1907, the Colony of Newfoundland became the Dominion of Newfoundland, leaving the Imperial fortress of Bermuda as the sole remaining British North American colony.

Bermuda, with a land mass totalling less than 21 square miles and a population of 17,535, could hardly constitute an Imperial administrative region on its own. By 1908, the Colonial Office included two departments (one overseeing dominion and protectorate business, the other colonial): The Crown Colonies Department was made up of a West Indian Division that included Bermuda, as well as Jamaica, Turks Islands, British Honduras, British Guiana, Bahamas, Bermuda, Trinidad, Barbados, Windward Islands, Leeward Islands, Falkland Islands, and St. Helena.

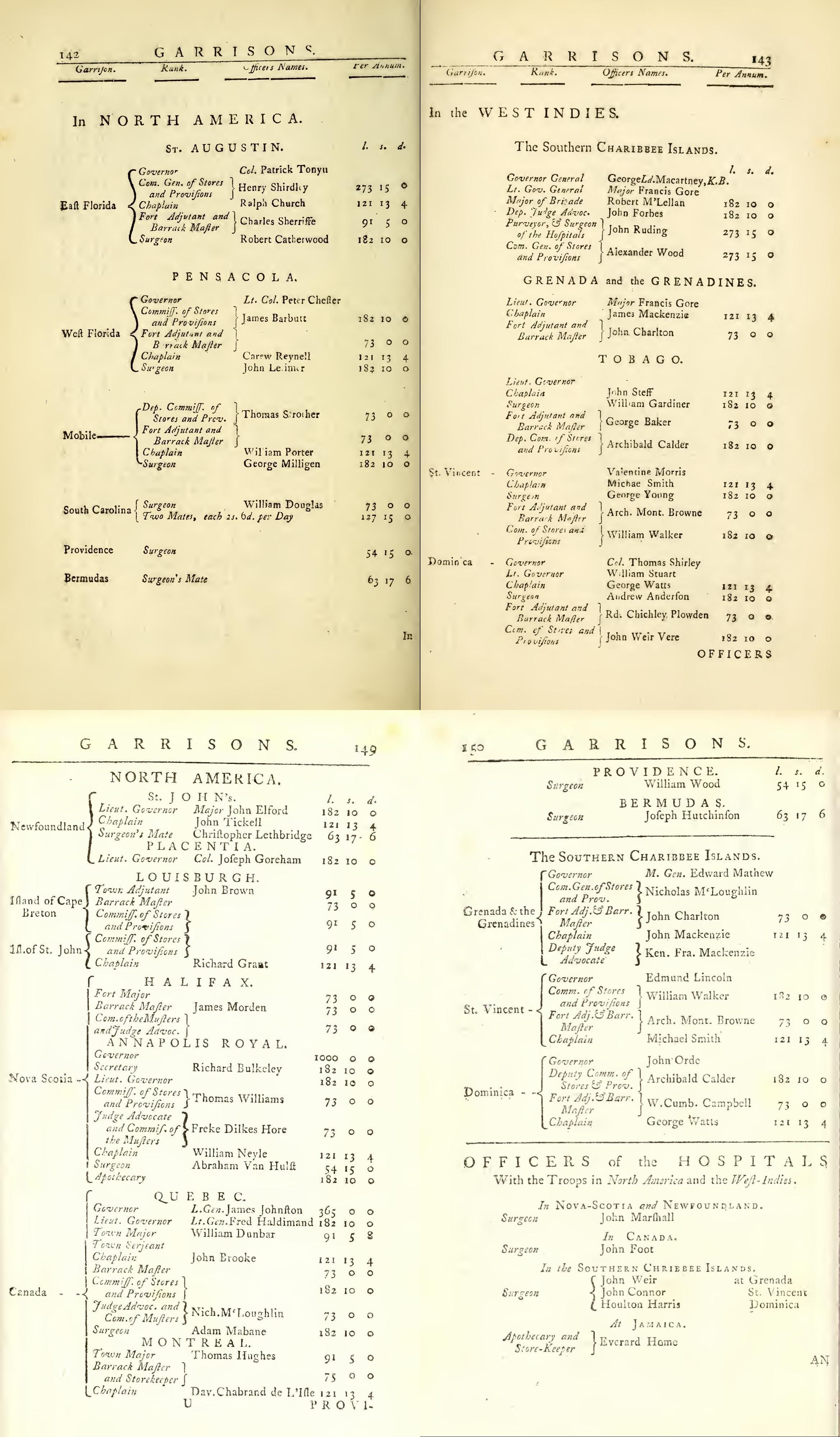
Military Governors and Staff Officers in British North America and West Indies, 1778 and 1784

Following Canadian confederation in 1867, the British political, naval and military hierarchy in Bermuda became increasingly separated from that of the Canadian Government. The Royal Navy headquarters for the North America and West Indies Station had spent summers at Halifax, Nova Scotia, and winters at Bermuda, but settled at Bermuda year round with the Royal Naval Dockyard, Halifax finally being transferred to the Royal Canadian Navy in 1907. The Bermuda Garrison had been placed under the military Commander-in-Chief America in New York during the American War of Independence, and had been part of the Nova Scotia Command thereafter, but became the separate Bermuda Command from the 1860s with the Major-General or Lieutenant-General appointed as Commander-in-Chief of Bermuda also filling the civil role of Governor of Bermuda, and Bermuda was increasingly perceived by the British Government as in, or at least grouped for convenience with, the British West Indies (although the established Church of England in Bermuda, which from 1825 to 1839 had been attached to the See of Nova Scotia) remained part of the Diocese of Newfoundland and Bermuda until 1879, when the Synod of the Church of England in Bermuda was formed and a Diocese of Bermuda became separate from the Diocese of Newfoundland, but continued to be grouped under the Bishop of Newfoundland and Bermuda until 1919, when Newfoundland and Bermuda each received its own bishop. Newfoundland attained Dominion status in 1907, leaving the nearest other territories to Bermuda that were still within the British Realm (a term which replaced Dominion in 1952 as the dominions and a number of colonies moved towards full political independence) as the British colonies in the British West Indies.

Other denominations also at one time included Bermuda with Nova Scotia or Canada. Following the separation of the Church of England from the Roman Catholic Church, Roman Catholic worship was outlawed in England (subsequently Britain) and its colonies, including Bermuda, until the Roman Catholic Relief Act 1791, and operated thereafter under restrictions until the Twentieth Century. Once Roman Catholic worship was established, Bermuda formed part of the Archdiocese of Halifax, Nova Scotia until 1953, when it was separated to become the Apostolic Prefecture of Bermuda Islands. The congregation of the first African Methodist Episcopal Church in Bermuda (St. John African Methodist Episcopal Church, erected in 1885 in Hamilton Parish) had previously been part of the British Methodist Episcopal Church of Canada.

An appreciable number of British West Indians immigrated to Bermuda during the course of the 20th century, with some filling qualified roles and integrating into the community, but others working as labourers and often derided as criminals or "jump ups" competing for jobs and pushing down the cost of labour. In recent decades, West Indians also came to be associated in Bermuda with law enforcement. The difficulty faced by the Bermuda Police Service in obtaining recruits locally had long led to recruitment of constables from the British Isles, which resulted in criticism of the racial make up of the force not reflecting that of the wider community. Consequently, in 1966 the Bermuda Police Force (as it was then titled) began also recruiting constables from British West Indian police forces, starting with seven constables from Barbados. Although the practice of recruiting from the British West Indies would continue, it was not deemed entirely successful. As the "Bermuda Report for the year 1971" recorded:

More recently police have been recruited from the Caribbean with a view to correcting the racial imbalance in the force. This has not been particularly successful, Bermudians regarding West Indians as much, if not more, expatriate as recruits from the United Kingdom, which has been and remains the main source of recruitment.

Despite the traditional antipathy some Bermudians had for West Indians, and despite Bermuda not being in the Caribbean region, Bermuda became an associate member of the Caribbean Community (CARICOM) in July 2003.

CARICOM is a socio-economic bloc of nations in or near the Caribbean Sea established in 1973. Other outlying member states include the Co-operative Republic of Guyana and the Republic of Suriname in South America, and Belize in Central America. The Turks and Caicos Islands, an associate member of CARICOM, and the Commonwealth of The Bahamas, a full member of CARICOM, are in the Atlantic, but close to the Caribbean. Other nearby nations or territories, such as the United States, are not members (although the US Commonwealth of Puerto Rico has observer status, and the United States Virgin Islands announced in 2007 that they would seek ties with CARICOM). Bermuda is located in the North Atlantic, roughly 1,600 kilometres (1,000 mi) from the Caribbean Sea, and maintains minimal trade with the Caribbean region. Its primary trading partners are the United States, Canada, and the United Kingdom; in 2023, the United States accounted for nearly 90% of Bermuda's exports, while Canada and the United Kingdom each accounted for around 2%. Despite its distance from the Caribbean, Bermuda joined CARICOM to strengthen historical, cultural, and familial ties with the region.

Among some scholars, "the Caribbean" can be a socio-historical category, commonly referring to a cultural zone characterised by the legacy of slavery (a characteristic Bermuda shared with the Caribbean and the US) and the plantation system (which did not exist in Bermuda). It embraces the islands and parts of the neighbouring continent, and may be extended to include the Caribbean Diaspora overseas.

The PLP, which was the party in government when the decision was made to join CARICOM, has been dominated for decades by West Indians and their descendants. The prominent roles of West Indians among Bermuda's black politicians and labour activists predated party politics in Bermuda, as exemplified by E. F. Gordon. The late PLP leader, Dame Lois Browne-Evans (whose parents and grandparents emigrated to Bermuda from Nevis and St. Kitts in 1914), and her Trinidadian-born husband, John Evans (who co-founded the West Indian Association of Bermuda in 1976), were prominent members of this group. A generation later, PLP politicians included Premiers Dr. Ewart Brown (raised in Jamaica, with two Jamaican grandparents) and Edward David Burt (whose mother is Jamaican), Deputy Premier Walter Roban (son of Matthew Roban, from St. Vincent and the Grenadines), Speaker of the House of Assembly Randy Horton (whose paternal grandparents came from Saba and St. Kitt's, and Senator Rolfe Commissiong (son of Trinidadian musician Rudolph Patrick Commissiong). They have emphasised Bermuda's cultural connections with the West Indies. A majority of Bermudians, both black and white, who lack family connections to the West Indies have objected to this emphasis.

The decision to join CARICOM stirred up a huge amount of debate and speculation among the Bermudian community and politicians. Opinion polls conducted by two Bermudian newspapers, The Royal Gazette and The Bermuda Sun, showed that clear majorities of Bermudians were opposed to joining CARICOM.

The UBP, which had been in government from 1968 to 1998, argued that joining CARICOM was detrimental to Bermuda's interests, in that:

- Bermuda's trade with the West Indies is negligible, its primary economic partners being the US, Canada, and UK (it has no direct air or shipping links to Caribbean islands);
- CARICOM is moving towards a single economy;
- the Caribbean islands are generally competitors to Bermuda's already ailing tourism industry; and
- participation in CARICOM would involve considerable investment of money and the time of government officials that could more profitably be spent elsewhere.

In 2026, the PLP government has made a strong push to change Bermuda's associate membership of CARICOM to full membership. As with the decision to become an associate member, it is widely feared that the PLP will do this without giving the people of Bermuda a say, although the opposition OBA and activists are demanding the issue be put to a referendum. The PLP has caused already considerable discontent by permitting more than 400 Cuban labours to be brought in for the redevelopment of the Southampton Princess Hotel, perceived as costing Bermudians jobs and competing for housing (the government has housed some of the imported labourers in barracks at Warwick Camp), and it is feared that, as a full member, Bermuda would be obliged to permit free entry to West Indian workers, among other measures that might negatively impact Bermudians. As with the PLP's decision to become an associate member, clear majorities of Bermudians have been shown by newspaper polls to be against full membership, including a poll of residents (not all Bermudian) conducted by telephone by Narrative Research Bermuda (commissioned by the Royal Gazette newspaper) that showed "opposition to full membership increases with household income and is higher among White residents and Bermudians", with support for full membership ergo being centred among non-Bermudian black residents of Bermuda, the overwhelming majority of whom would be West Indians. Despite Bermudians, the only residents who could vote in a referendum (should one be held) being most strongly opposed, the PLP government has stated that the results of the poll (which showed 46% or residents, whether Bermudian or otherwise, against and 42% in favour of full membership, with 13% undecided - the large number of Bermudians not resident in Bermuda were not included in the poll, and - despite repeated calls for their enfranchisement, would not be able to vote in a referendum under current voting rules, and presumably would also be strongly opposed to full membership) are "encouraging".

=== Military and defence ===
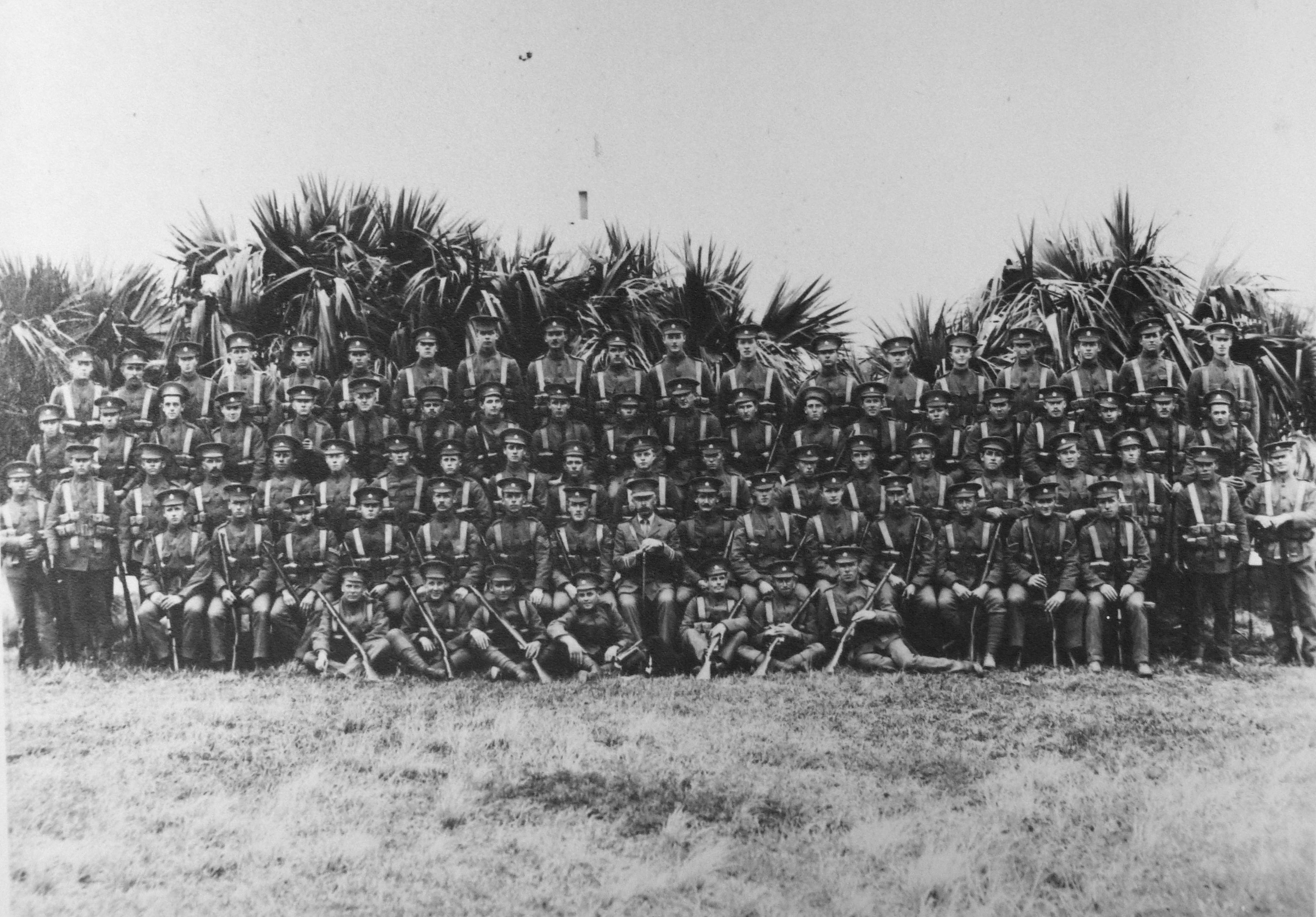
The First Bermuda Volunteer Rifle Corps Contingent, raised in 1914. By the war's end, the two BVRC contingents had lost over 75% of their combined strength.

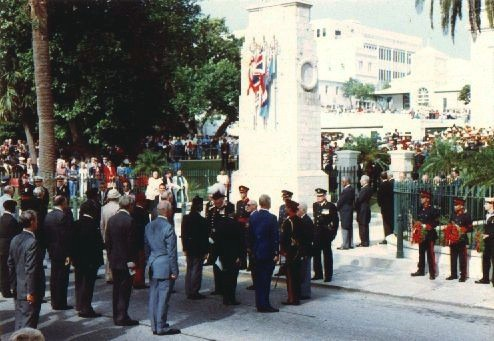
Remembrance Day Parade, Hamilton, Bermuda

A former Imperial fortress colony once known as "the Gibraltar of the West" and "Fortress Bermuda", defence of Bermuda, as part of the British sovereign state, is the responsibility of the British Government.

For the first two centuries of settlement, the most potent armed force operating from Bermuda was its merchant shipping fleet, which turned to privateering at every opportunity. The Bermuda government maintained a local (infantry) militia and fortified coastal artillery batteries manned by volunteer artillerymen. Bermuda tended toward the Royalist side during the English Civil War, being the first of six colonies to recognise Charles II as King on the execution of his father, Charles I, in 1649, and was one of those targeted by the Rump Parliament in An Act for prohibiting Trade with the Barbadoes, Virginia, Bermuda and Antego, which was passed on 30 October 1650. With control of the "army" (the militia and coastal artillery), the colony's Royalists deposed the Governor, Captain Thomas Turner, elected John Trimingham to replace him, and exiled a number of its Parliamentary leaning Independents to settle the Bahamas under William Sayle as the Eleutheran Adventurers. Bermuda's barrier reef, coastal artillery batteries and militia provided a defence too powerful for the fleet sent in 1651 by Parliament under the command of Admiral Sir George Ayscue to capture the Royalist colonies. The Parliamentary Navy was consequently forced to blockade Bermuda for several months 'til the Bermudians negotiated a peace.

After the American Revolutionary War, Bermuda was established as the Western Atlantic headquarters of the North America Station (later called the North America and West Indies Station, and later still the America and West Indies Station as it absorbed other stations) of the Royal Navy. Once the Royal Navy established a base and dockyard defended by regular soldiers, however, the militias were disbanded following the War of 1812. At the end of the 19th century, the colony raised volunteer units to form a reserve for the military garrison.

Due to its isolated location in the North Atlantic Ocean, Bermuda was vital to the Allies' war effort during both world wars of the 20th century, serving as a marshalling point for trans-Atlantic convoys, as well as a naval air base. By the Second World War, both the Royal Navy's Fleet Air Arm and the Royal Air Force were operating Seaplane bases on Bermuda.

In May 1940, the United States requested base rights in Bermuda from the United Kingdom, but British Prime Minister Winston Churchill was initially unwilling to accede to the American request without getting something in return. In September 1940, as part of the Destroyers for Bases Agreement, the UK granted the US base rights in Bermuda. Bermuda and Newfoundland were not originally included in the agreement, but both were added to it, with no war material received by the UK in exchange. One of the terms of the agreement was that the airfield the US Army built would be used jointly by the US and the UK (which it was for the duration of the war, with RAF Transport Command relocating there from Darrell's Island in 1943). The US Army established the Bermuda Base Command in 1941 to co-ordinate its air, anti-aircraft, and coast artillery assets during the war. The US Navy operated a submarine base on Ordnance Island from 1942 through 1945.

Construction began in 1941 of two airbases consisting of 5.8 km^{2} (2.2 sq mi) of land, largely reclaimed from the sea. For a number of years, Bermuda's bases were used by US Air Force transport and refuelling aircraft and by US Navy aircraft patrolling the Atlantic for enemy submarines, first German and, later, Soviet. The principal installation, Kindley Air Force Base on the eastern coast, was transferred to the US Navy in 1970 and redesignated Naval Air Station Bermuda. As a naval air station, the base continued to host both transient and deployed USN and USAF aircraft, as well as transitioning or deployed Royal Air Force and Canadian Forces aircraft.

The original NAS Bermuda on the west side of the island, a seaplane base until the mid-1960s, was designated as the Naval Air Station Bermuda Annex. It provided optional anchorage and dockage facilities for transiting US Navy, US Coast Guard and NATO vessels, depending on size. An additional US Navy compound known as Naval Facility Bermuda (NAVFAC Bermuda), a submarine-detecting SOSUS station, was located to the west of the Annex near a Canadian Forces communications facility in the Tudor Hill area; it was converted from a US Army coast artillery bunker in 1954 and operated until 1995. Although leased for 99 years, US forces withdrew in 1995, as part of the wave of base closures following the end of the Cold War.

Canada, which had operated a war-time naval base, HMCS Somers Isles, on the old Royal Navy base at Convict Bay, St George's, also established a radio-listening post at Daniel's Head in the West End of the islands during this time.

In the 1950s, after the end of World War II, the Royal Naval dockyard and the military garrison were closed. A small Royal Navy supply base, HMS Malabar, continued to operate within the dockyard area, supporting transiting Royal Navy ships and submarines until it, too, was closed in 1995, along with the American and Canadian bases.

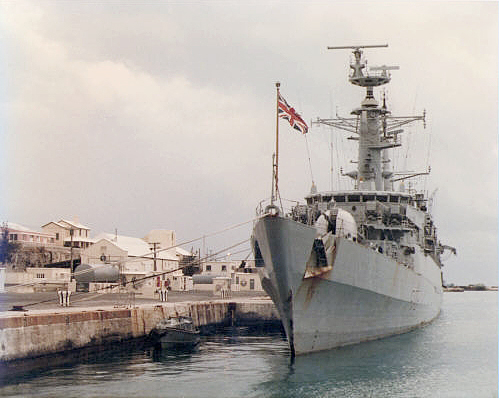
HMS Ambuscade at the Royal Naval Dockyard in 1988

Bermudians served in the British armed forces during both World War I and World War II. After the latter, Major-General Glyn Charles Anglim Gilbert, Bermuda's highest-ranking soldier, was instrumental in developing the Royal Bermuda Regiment. A number of other Bermudians and their descendants had preceded him into senior ranks, including Bahamian-born Admiral Lord Gambier, and Bermudian-born Royal Marines Brigadier A. John Harvey. When promoted to brigadier at age 38, following his wounding at the Allied invasion of Sicily, Harvey became the youngest-ever Royal Marine Brigadier. The Cenotaph in front of the Cabinet Building (in Hamilton) was erected in tribute to Bermuda's Great War dead (the tribute was later extended to Bermuda's Second World War dead) and is the site of the annual Remembrance Day commemoration.

Today, the only military unit remaining in Bermuda, other than naval and army cadet corps, is the Royal Bermuda Regiment, an amalgam of the voluntary units originally formed toward the end of the 19th century. Although the Regiment's predecessors were voluntary units, until 2018 the modern body was formed primarily by conscription: balloted males were required to serve for three years, two months part-time, once they turn 18. Conscription was abolished 1 July 2018.

In early 2020 the Royal Bermuda Regiment formed the Bermuda Coast Guard. Its 24-hour on-duty service includes search and rescue, counter-narcotics operations, border control, and protection of Bermuda's maritime interests. The Bermuda Coast Guard will interact with the rest of the Royal Bermuda Regiment and the Bermuda Police Service.

=== Police ===
Law enforcement in Bermuda is provided chiefly by the Bermuda Police Service and is also supported with the Customs Department and Immigration Department. During certain times the Royal Bermuda Regiment can be called in to assist law enforcement personnel.

== Economy ==
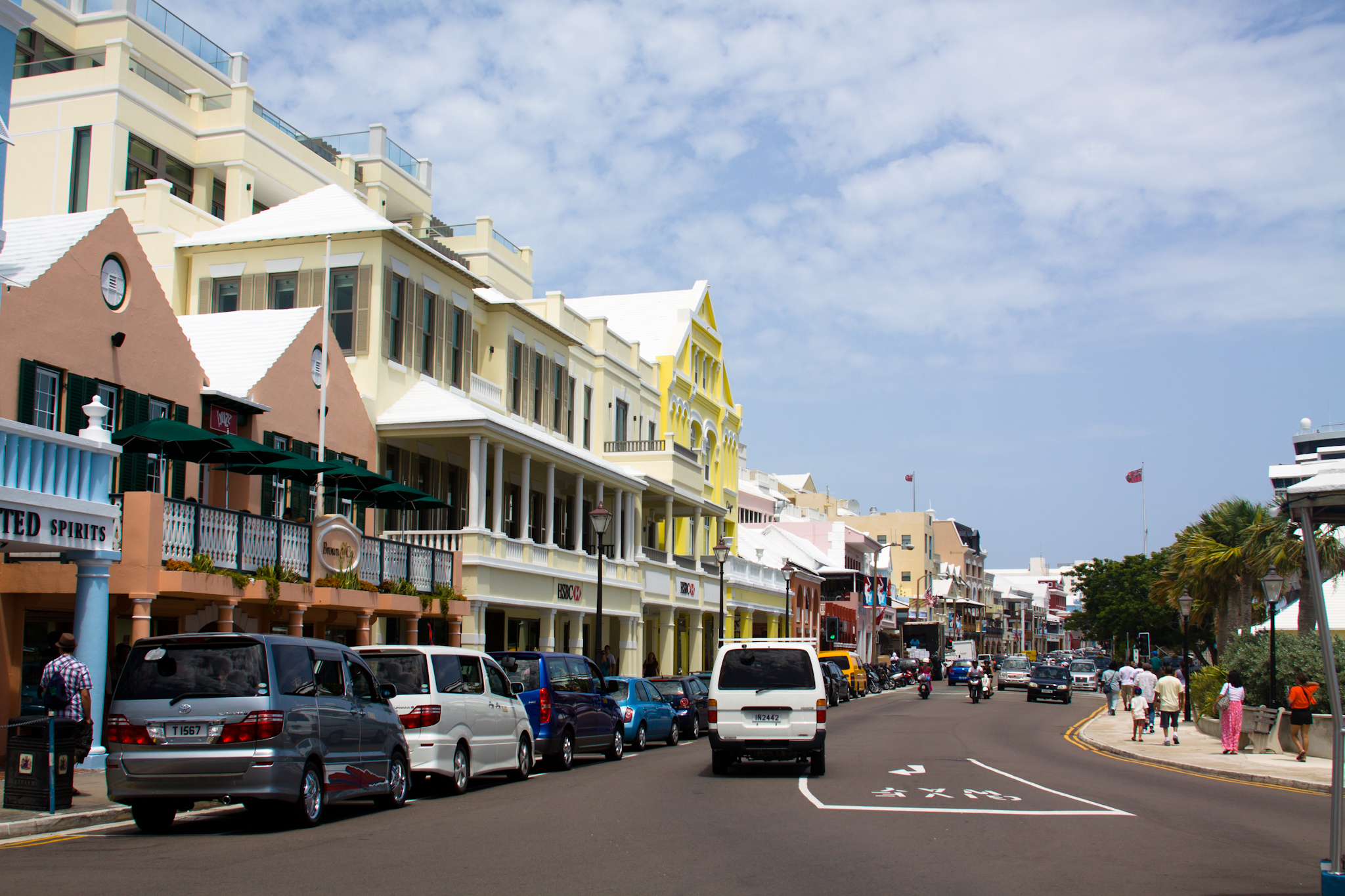
Front Street, Hamilton

Banking and other financial services now form the largest sector of the economy at about 85% of GDP, with tourism being the second largest industry at 5%. Industrial and agriculture activities occur; however, these are on a limited scale and Bermuda is heavily reliant on imports. Living standards are high and as of 2019 Bermuda has the 6th-highest GDP per capita in the world.

=== 1890s to 1920s: economy severely affected by lily virus ===
Early Easter Lily bulb exports to New York—then vital financially for Bermuda—became badly diseased from the late 19th century to the mid-1920s. Lawrence Ogilvie, the Bermuda Department of Agriculture plant pathologist saved the industry by identifying the problem as a virus (not aphid damage as previously thought) and instituting controls in the fields and packing houses. Exports showed a marked improvement: from 23 cases of lily bulbs in 1918, to 6,043 cases in 1927 from the 204 lily fields then in existence. Still in his 20s at the time, Ogilvie was professionally honoured by an article in Nature magazine. The lily export trade continued to flourish until the 1940s when the Japanese captured much of the market.

=== Currency ===
In 1970, the colony switched its currency from the Bermudian pound to the Bermudian dollar, which is pegged at par with the US dollar. US notes and coins are used interchangeably with Bermudian notes and coins within the islands for most practical purposes; however, banks levy an exchange rate fee for the purchase of US dollars with Bermudian dollars for those going out of the islands for external purposes. The Bermuda Monetary Authority is the issuing authority for all banknotes and coins and regulates financial institutions.

=== Finance ===
Bermuda is an offshore financial centre, which results from its minimal standards of business regulation/laws and direct taxation on personal or corporate income. There is no personal income tax or consumption tax. A corporate income tax was only introduced in 2025 and applies to multinational enterprises with annual revenues of €750 million or more. Additionally, the local tax system depends upon import duties, payroll taxes and land taxes.

Having had no corporate income tax prior to 2025, Bermuda is a popular tax avoidance location. Google, for example, is known to have shifted over $10 billion in revenue to its Bermuda subsidiary using the Double Irish and Dutch Sandwich tax avoidance strategies, reducing its 2011 tax liability by $2 billion. The Bermuda Black Hole is another tax avoidance method in which untaxed profits end up in Bermuda.

Large numbers of leading international insurance companies operate in Bermuda. Those internationally owned and operated businesses that are physically based in Bermuda (around four hundred) are represented by the Association of Bermuda International Companies (ABIC). In total, over 15,000 exempted or international companies are currently registered with the Registrar of Companies in Bermuda, most of which hold no office space or employees.

The Bermuda Stock Exchange (BSX) specialises in listing and trading of capital market instruments such as equities, debt issues, funds (including hedge fund structures) and depository receipt programmes. The BSX is a full member of the World Federation of Exchanges and is located in an OECD member nation. It also has Approved Stock Exchange status under Australia's Foreign Investment Fund (FIF) taxation rules and Designated Investment Exchange status by the UK's Financial Services Authority.

Four banks operate in Bermuda, having consolidated total assets of $24.3 billion (March 2014).

=== Tourism ===
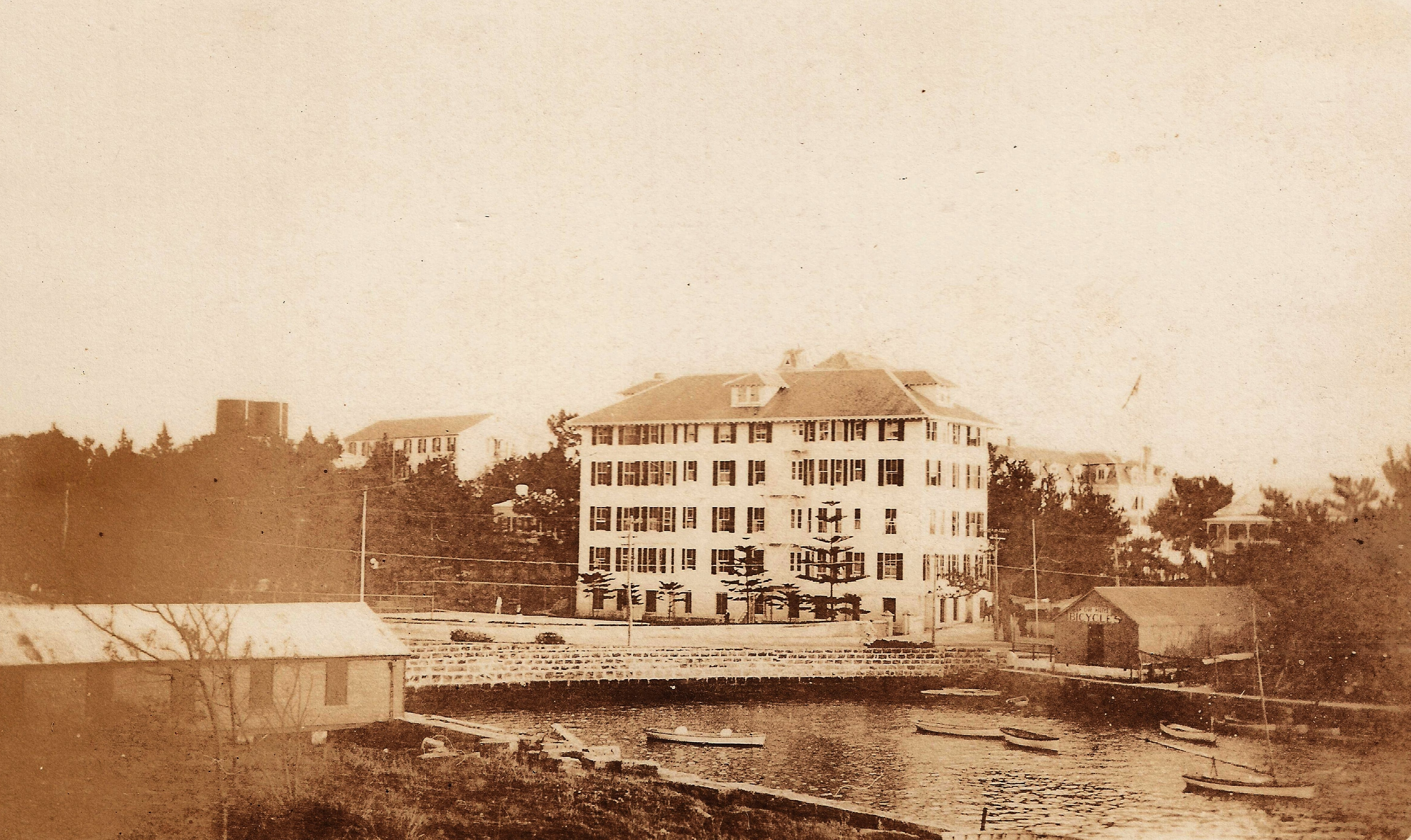
The Princess Hotel, circa 1900

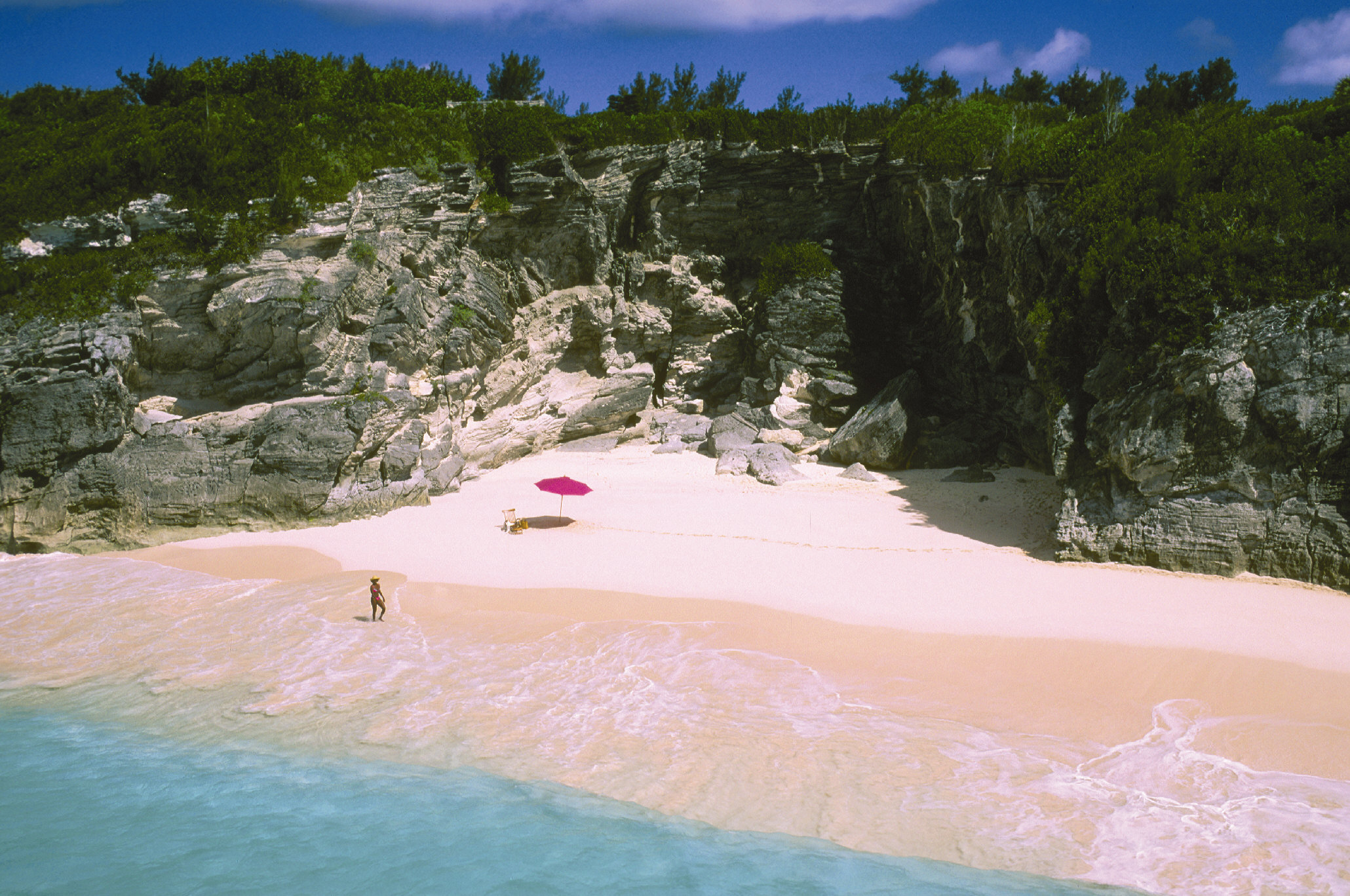
One of Bermuda's pink-sand beaches at Astwood Park

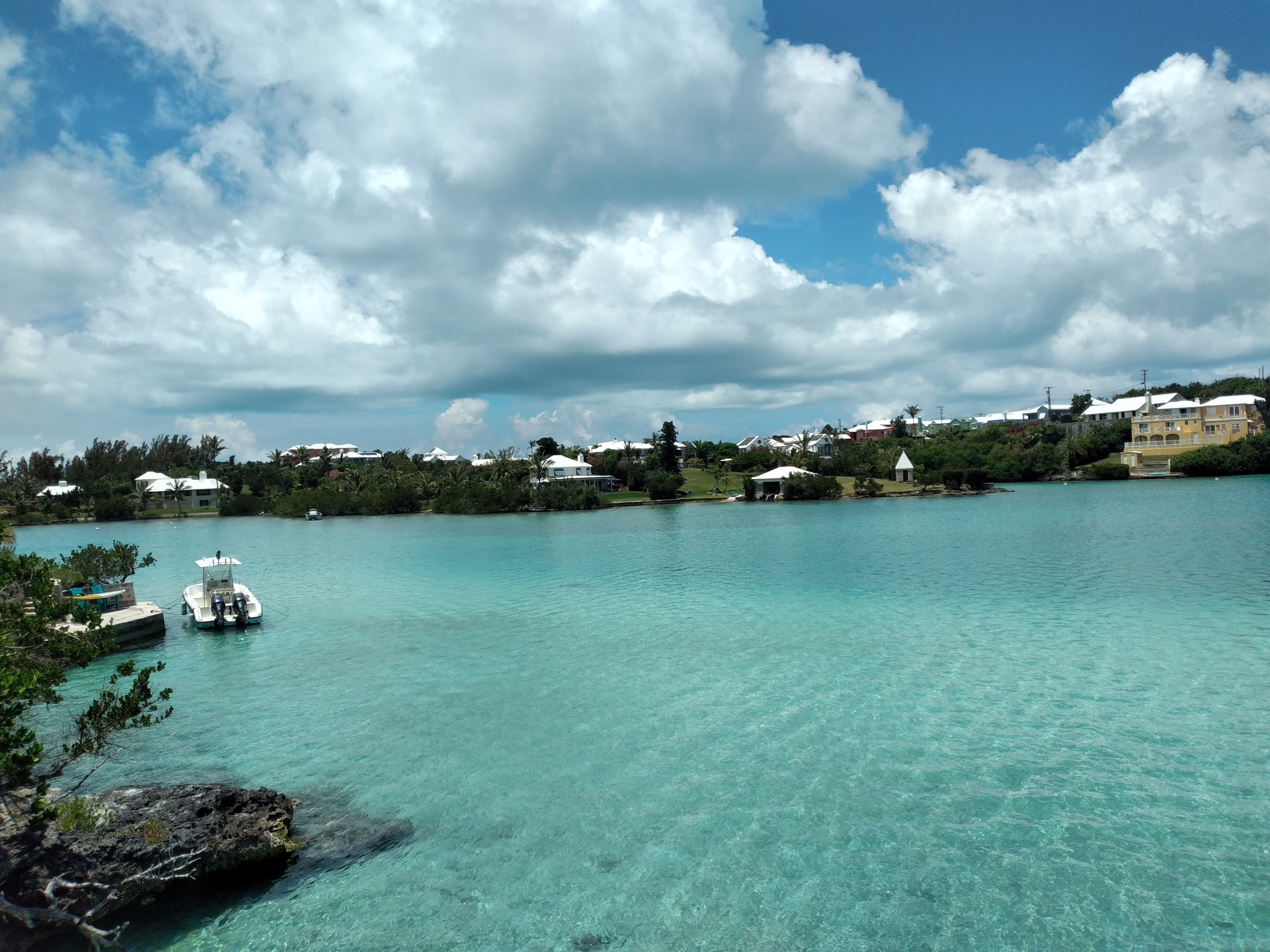
View of Harrington Sound from behind Bermuda Aquarium, Museum, and Zoo

Tourism is Bermuda's second-largest industry, with the island attracting over half a million visitors annually, of whom more than 80% are from the United States. Other significant sources of visitors are from Canada and the United Kingdom. However, the sector is vulnerable to external shocks, such as the 2008 recession.

Nearly 80% of Bermuda visitors are cruise passengers (about 535,000 in 2024), with 20% flying in (about 140,000 in 2024). However, in terms of which group spends the most money during their stay in Bermuda, the numbers are flipped, whereby air visitors make up 78% of the $531 million spent there in 2024.

=== Housing ===
The affordability of housing became a prominent issue during Bermuda's business peak in 2005 but has softened with the decline of Bermuda's real estate prices. The World Factbook lists the average cost of a house in June 2003 as $976,000, while real estate agencies have claimed that this figure had risen to between $1.6 million and $1.845 million by 2007, though such high figures have been disputed.

=== Transportation ===
Bermuda consists of several islands with an area of 53.2 km^{2} (20.5 sq mi) with 447 km (278 mi) of paved roads—225 km (140 mi) of which are public roads and 222 km (138 mi) are private paved roads. A former railway track has been converted into a walking trail. There are also two marine ports (Hamilton and St. George's), and an airport, the L.F. Wade International Airport, located at the former US Naval Air Station. A causeway links Hamilton Parish, Bermuda to St. George's and the airport.

In common with the United Kingdom and most British Overseas Territories, traffic drives on the left.

Bermuda's Ministry of Tourism and Transport manages the public ferry service, "SeaExpress", and the public bus system.

== Demographics ==
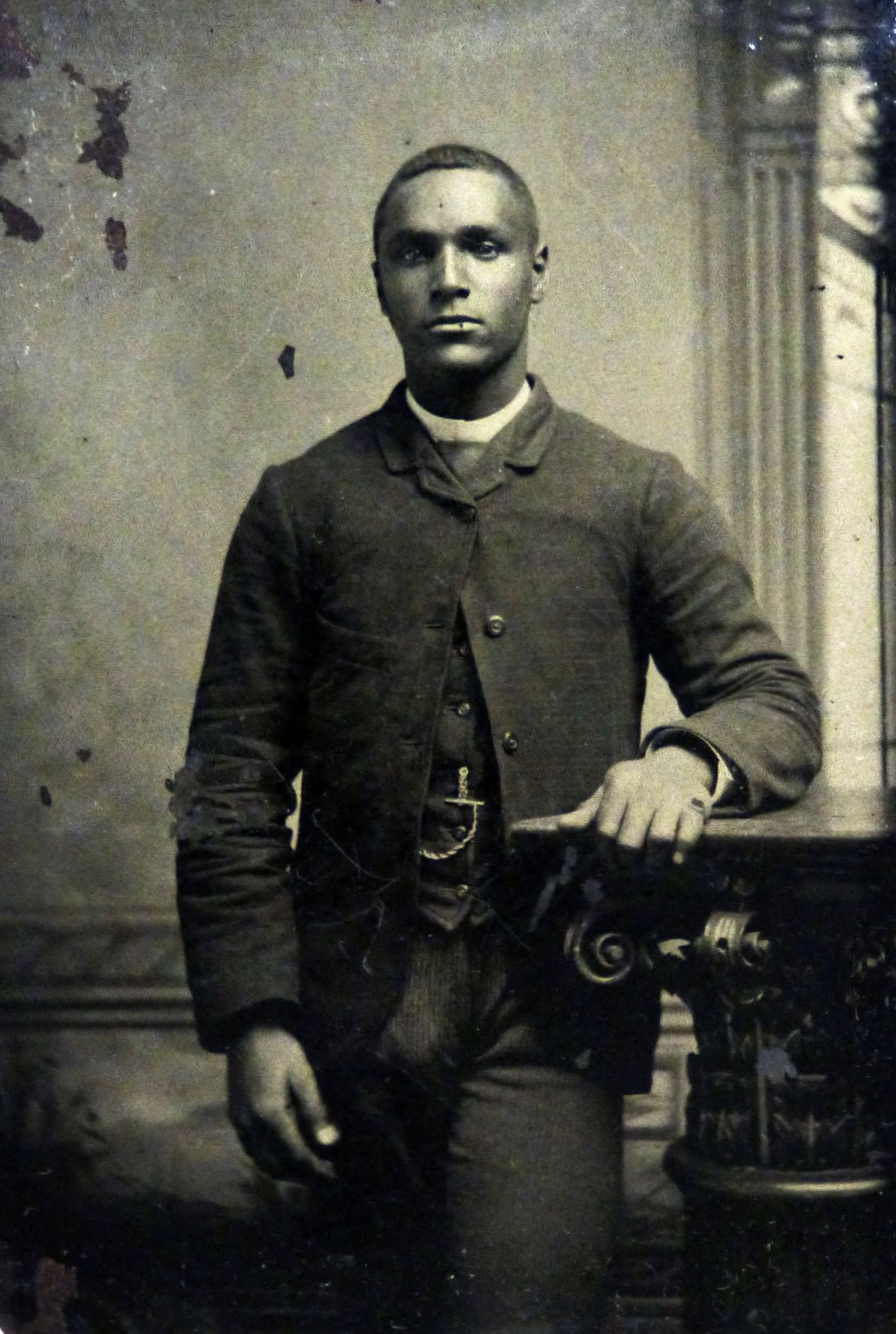
Young Bermudian man in the 19th century

Racial groups in Bermuda (2016 Census)
Ethnic groups	percent
Black	52%
White	31%
Mixed	9%
Asian	4%
Other	4%

Bermuda's 2016 Census put its population at 63,779, and with an area of 53.2 km^{2} (20.5 sq mi) it has a calculated population density of 1,201 people/km^{2} (3,110 people/mi^{2}). As of July 2018 the population is estimated to be 71,176.

The racial makeup of Bermuda was 52% Black, 31% White, 9% multiracial, 4% Asian, and 4% other races, these numbers being based on self-identification recorded by the 2016 census. The majority of those who answered Black may have any mixture of black, white or other ancestry. Native-born Bermudians made up 70% of the population, compared with 30% non-natives.

The island experienced large-scale immigration over the 20th century, especially after World War II. About 64% of the population identified themselves with Bermudian ancestry in 2010, an increase from the 51% who did so in the 2000 census. Those identifying with British ancestry dropped by one percentage point to 11% – although those born in the United Kingdom remain the largest non-native group at 3,942 people. The number of people born in Canada declined by 13%. 13% of the population reported West Indian ancestry and the number increased by 538. A significant segment of the population is of Portuguese ancestry (25%), the result of immigration over the past 160 years, of whom 79% have residency status. In June 2018, Premier Edward David Burt announced that 4 November 2019 'will be declared a public holiday to mark the 170th anniversary of the arrival of the first Portuguese immigrants in Bermuda' due to the significant impact that Portuguese immigration has had on the territory. Those first immigrants arrived from Madeira aboard the vessel the Golden Rule on 4 November 1849.

There are also several thousand expatriate workers, principally from the United Kingdom, the United States, Canada, the West Indies and South Africa, who reside in Bermuda. They are primarily engaged in specialised professions such as accounting, finance and insurance. Others are employed in various trades, such as hotels, restaurants, construction and landscaping services. Despite the high cost of living, the high salaries offer expatriates several benefits. Of the total workforce of 38,947 people in 2005, government employment figures stated that 11,223 (29%) were non-Bermudians.

=== Languages ===
The predominant language in Bermuda is Bermudian English.

British English spellings and conventions are used in print media and formal written communications. Portuguese is also spoken by migrants from the Azores, Madeira and the Cape Verde Islands and their descendants.

=== Religion ===
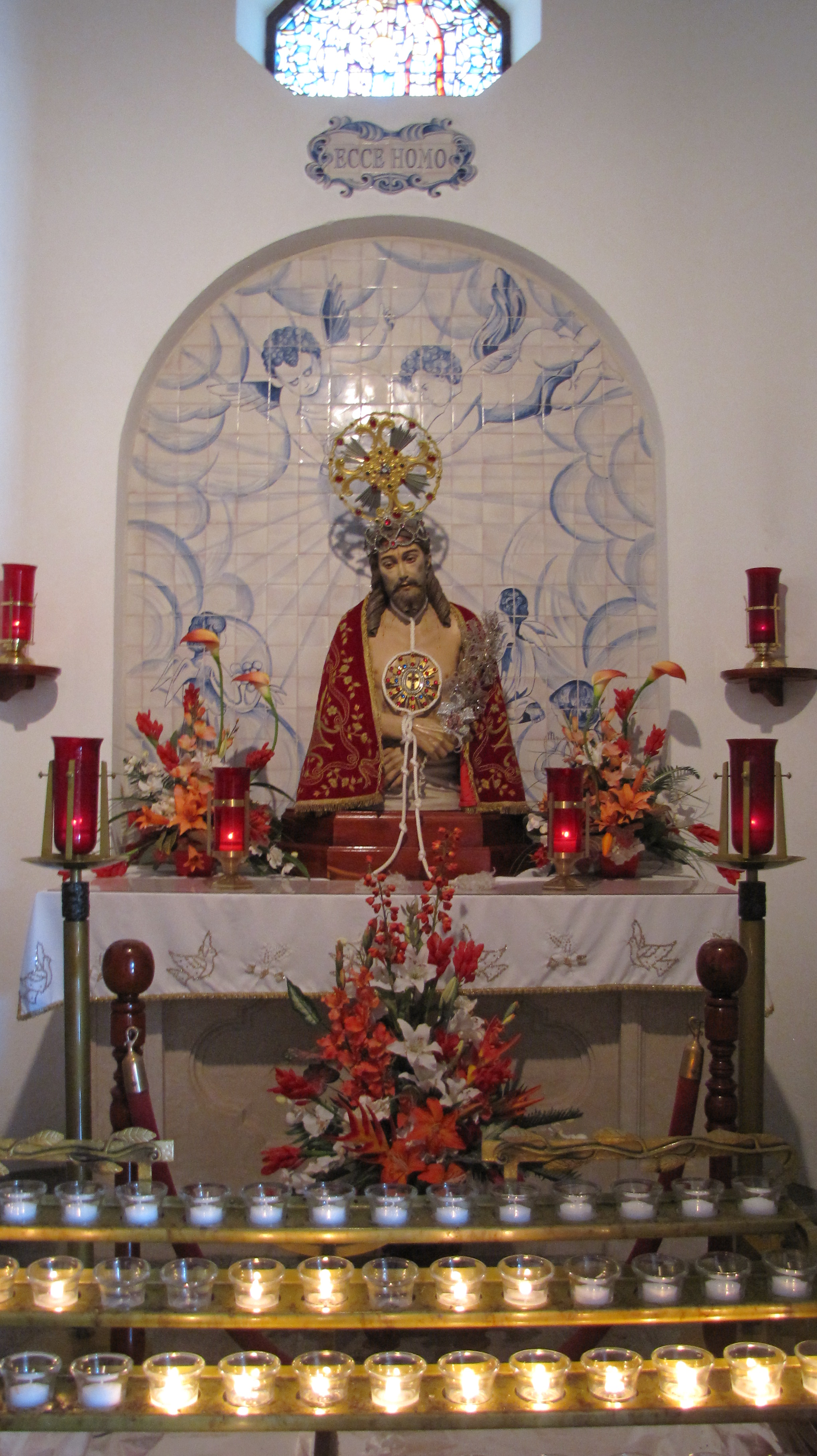
The image of the Lord Holy Christ of the Miracles, in Hamilton, venerated by Azoreans in Bermuda

Religious affiliations in Bermuda (2010)
1. Protestantism (46.2%)
2. Roman Catholicism (14.5%)
3. Other Christian (9.10%)
4. Unaffiliated (17.8%)
5. Other religion (12.4%)

Christianity is the largest religion on Bermuda. Various Protestant denominations are dominant at 46.2% (including Anglican 15.8%; African Methodist Episcopal 8.6%; Seventh-day Adventist 6.7%; Pentecostal 3.5%; Methodist 2.7%; Presbyterian 2.0%; Church of God 1.6%; Baptist 1.2%; Salvation Army 1.1%; Brethren 1.0%; other Protestant 2.0%). Roman Catholics form 14.5%, Jehovah's Witnesses 1.3%, and other Christians 9.1%. The balance of the population are Muslim 1%, other 3.9%, none 17.8%, or unspecified 6.2% (2010 est.).

The Anglican Church of Bermuda, an Anglican Communion diocese separate from the Church of England, operates the oldest non-Catholic parish in the New World, St. Peter's Church. Catholics are served by a single Latin diocese, the Diocese of Hamilton in Bermuda.

=== Education ===
The Bermuda Education Act 1996 requires that only three categories of schools can operate in the Bermuda Education system:

- An aided school has all or a part of its property vested in a body of trustees or board of governors and is partially maintained by public funding or, since 1965 and the desegregation of schools, has received a grant-in-aid out of public funds.
- A maintained school has the whole of its property belonging to the Government and is fully maintained by public funds.
- A private school, not maintained by public funds and which has not, since 1965 and the desegregation of schools, received any capital grant-in-aid out of public funds. The private school sector consists of six traditional private schools, two of which are religious schools, and the remaining four are secular with one of these being a single-gender school and another a Montessori school. Also, within the private sector there are a number of home schools, which must be registered with the government and receive minimal government regulation. The only boys' school opened its doors to girls in the 1990s, and in 1996, one of the aided schools became a private school.

Prior to 1950, the Bermuda school system was racially segregated. When the desegregation of schools was enacted in 1965, two of the formerly maintained "white" schools and both single-sex schools opted to become private schools. The rest became part of the public school system and were either aided or maintained.

There are 38 schools in the Bermuda Public School System, including 10 preschools, 18 primary schools, 5 middle schools, 2 senior schools (The Berkeley Institute and Cedarbridge Academy), 1 school for students with physical and cognitive challenges, and 1 for students with behavioural problems. There is one aided primary school, two aided middle schools, and one aided senior school. Since 2010, Portuguese has been taught as an optional foreign language in the Bermudian school system.

For higher education, the Bermuda College offers various associate degrees and other certificate programmes. Bermuda does not have any Bachelor-level colleges or universities. Bermuda's graduates usually attend Bachelor-level universities in the United States, Canada and the United Kingdom.

In May 2009, the Bermudian Government's application was approved to become a contributory member of the University of the West Indies (UWI). Bermuda's membership enabled Bermudian students to enter the university at an agreed-upon subsidised rate by 2010. UWI also agreed that its Open Campus (online degree courses) would become open to Bermudian students in the future, with Bermuda becoming the 13th country to have access to the Open Campus. In 2010, it was announced that Bermuda would be an "associate contributing country" due to local Bermudian laws.

=== Health ===
The Bermuda Hospitals Board operates the King Edward VII Memorial Hospital, located in Paget Parish, and the Mid-Atlantic Wellness Institute, located in Devonshire Parish. Boston's Lahey Medical Center has an established visiting specialists program on the island which provides Bermudians and expats with access to specialists regularly on the island. There were about 6,000 hospital admissions, 30,000 emergency department attendances and 6,300 outpatient procedures in 2017.

Unlike the other territories that still remain under British administration, Bermuda does not have national healthcare. Employers must provide a healthcare plan and pay for up to 50% of the cost for each employee. Healthcare is a mandatory requirement and is expensive, even with the help provided by employers. There are only a few approved healthcare providers that offer insurance to Bermudians. As of 2016, these were the Bermudian government's Health Insurance Department, three other approved licensed health insurance companies, and three approved health insurance schemes (provided by the Bermudian government for its employees and by two banks).

There are no paramedics on the island. The Bermuda Hospitals Board said in 2018 that they were not vital in Bermuda because of its small size. Nurse practitioners on the island, of which there are not many, can be granted authority to write prescriptions "under the authority of a medical practitioner".

== Culture ==
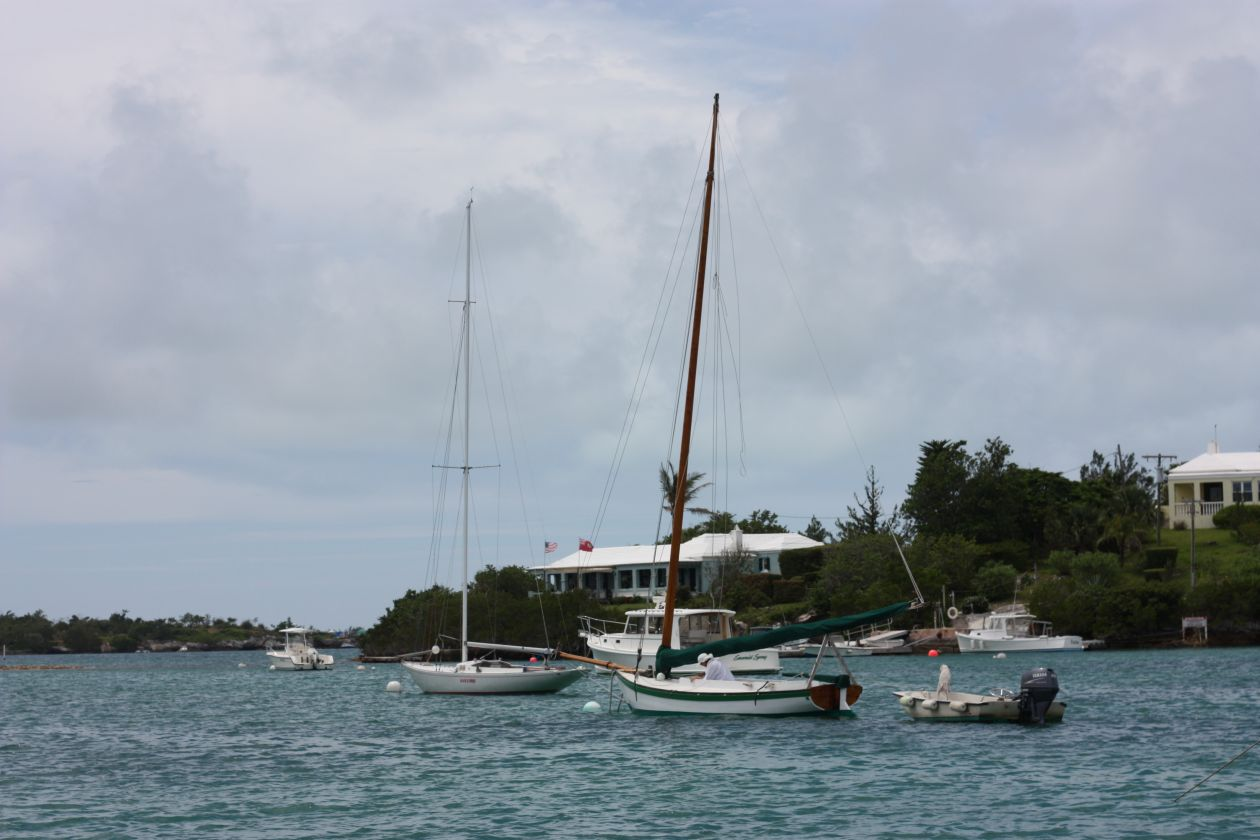
An IOD sloop and a 19th-century Bermudian working boat in Bermuda

Bermuda's culture is a mixture of the various sources of its population: Native American, Spanish-Caribbean, English, Irish, and Scots cultures were evident in the 17th century, and became part of the dominant British culture. English is the primary and official language. Due to 160 years of immigration from Portuguese Atlantic islands (primarily the Azores, though also from Madeira and the Cape Verde Islands), a portion of the population also speaks Portuguese. There are strong British influences, together with Afro-Caribbean ones.

The first notable, and historically important, book credited to a Bermudian was The History of Mary Prince, a slave narrative by Mary Prince. The book was published in 1831 at the height of Great Britain's abolitionist movement. Ernest Graham Ingham, an expatriate author, published his books at the turn of the 19th and 20th centuries. The novelist Brian Burland (1931– 2010) achieved a degree of success and acclaim internationally. More recently, Angela Barry has won critical recognition for her published fiction.

=== Arts ===
West Indian musicians introduced calypso music when Bermuda's tourist industry was expanded with the increase of visitors brought by post-Second World War aviation. Local icons the Talbot Brothers performed calypso music for a number of decades both in Bermuda and the United States, and appeared on the Ed Sullivan Show. While calypso appealed more to tourists than to the local residents, reggae has been embraced by a number of Bermudians since the 1970s with the influx of Jamaican immigrants.

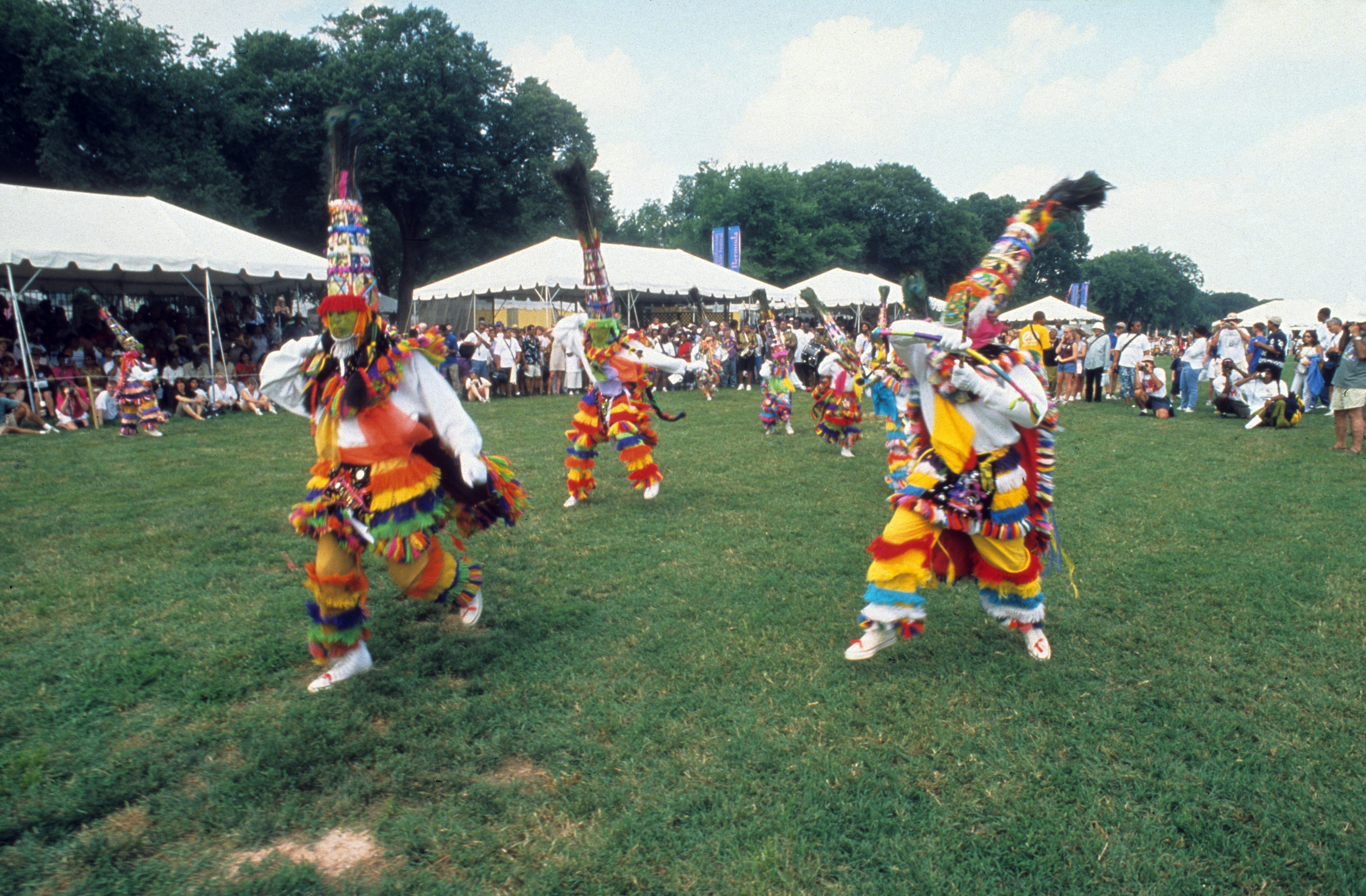
Gombey dancers from Bermuda at the 2001 Smithsonian Folklife Festival in Washington, D.C.

Noted Bermudian musicians include operatic tenor Gary Burgess; jazz pianist Lance Hayward; singer-songwriter and poet, Heather Nova, and her brother Mishka, reggae musician; classical musician and conductor Kenneth Amis; and more recently, dancehall artist Collie Buddz.

The Gombey troupes, that perform at multiple events, incorporate African, Caribbean and British musical traditions and instruments with a Native American influenced war dance, costume, and weaponry (a tomahawk and bow and arrow).

Alfred Birdsey was one of the more famous and talented watercolourists, known for his impressionistic landscapes of Hamilton, St George's, and the surrounding sailboats, homes, and bays of Bermuda. Hand-carved cedar sculptures are another speciality. In 2010, his sculpture We Arrive was unveiled in Barr's Bay Park, overlooking Hamilton Harbour, to commemorate the freeing of slaves in 1835 from the American brig Enterprise.

Local resident Tom Butterfield founded the Masterworks Museum of Bermuda Art in 1986, initially featuring works about Bermuda by artists from other countries. He began with pieces by American artists, such as Winslow Homer, Charles Demuth, and Georgia O'Keeffe, who had lived and worked on Bermuda. In 2008, the museum opened its new building, constructed within the Botanical Gardens.

Bermuda hosts an annual international film festival, which shows multiple independent films. One of the founders is film producer and director Arthur Rankin Jr., co-founder of the Rankin/Bass production company.

=== Sport ===
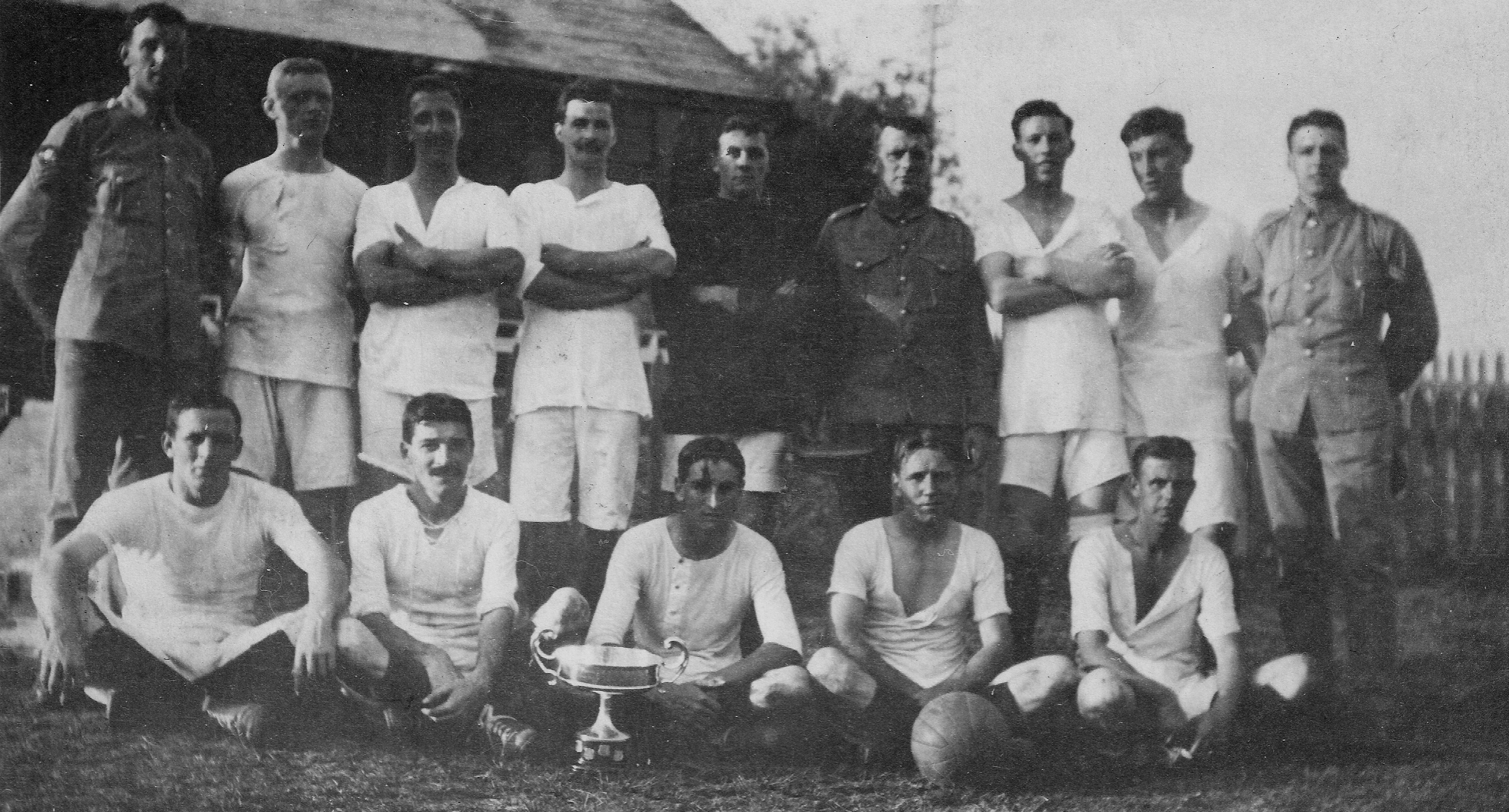
The football team of 95 Company, Royal Garrison Artillery, victors in the 1917 Governor's Cup football match, pose with the cup. The cup was contested annually by teams from the various Royal Navy, British Army Bermuda Garrison, and Royal Air Force units stationed in Bermuda.

Many sports popular today were formalised by British public schools and universities in the 19th century. These schools produced the civil servants and military and naval officers required to build and maintain the British Empire, and team sports were considered a vital tool for training their students to think and act as part of a team. Former public schoolboys continued to pursue these activities, and founded organisations such as the Football Association (FA).

Bermuda's role as the primary Royal Navy base in the Western Hemisphere ensured that the naval and military officers quickly introduced the newly formalised sports to Bermuda, including cricket, association football, rugby football, and even tennis and rowing.

Bermuda's national cricket team participated in the Cricket World Cup 2007 in the West Indies but were knocked out of the World Cup. The Bermuda national football team managed to qualify to the 2019 CONCACAF Gold Cup, the country's first ever major football competition. In 2007, Bermuda hosted the 25th PGA Grand Slam of Golf. This 36-hole event was held on 16–17 October 2007, at the Mid Ocean Club in Tucker's Town. This season-ending tournament is limited to four golfers: the winners of the Masters, US Open, The Open Championship and PGA Championship. The event returned to Bermuda in 2008 and 2009. One-armed Bermudian golfer Quinn Talbot was both the United States National Amputee Golf Champion for five successive years and the British World One-Arm Golf Champion.

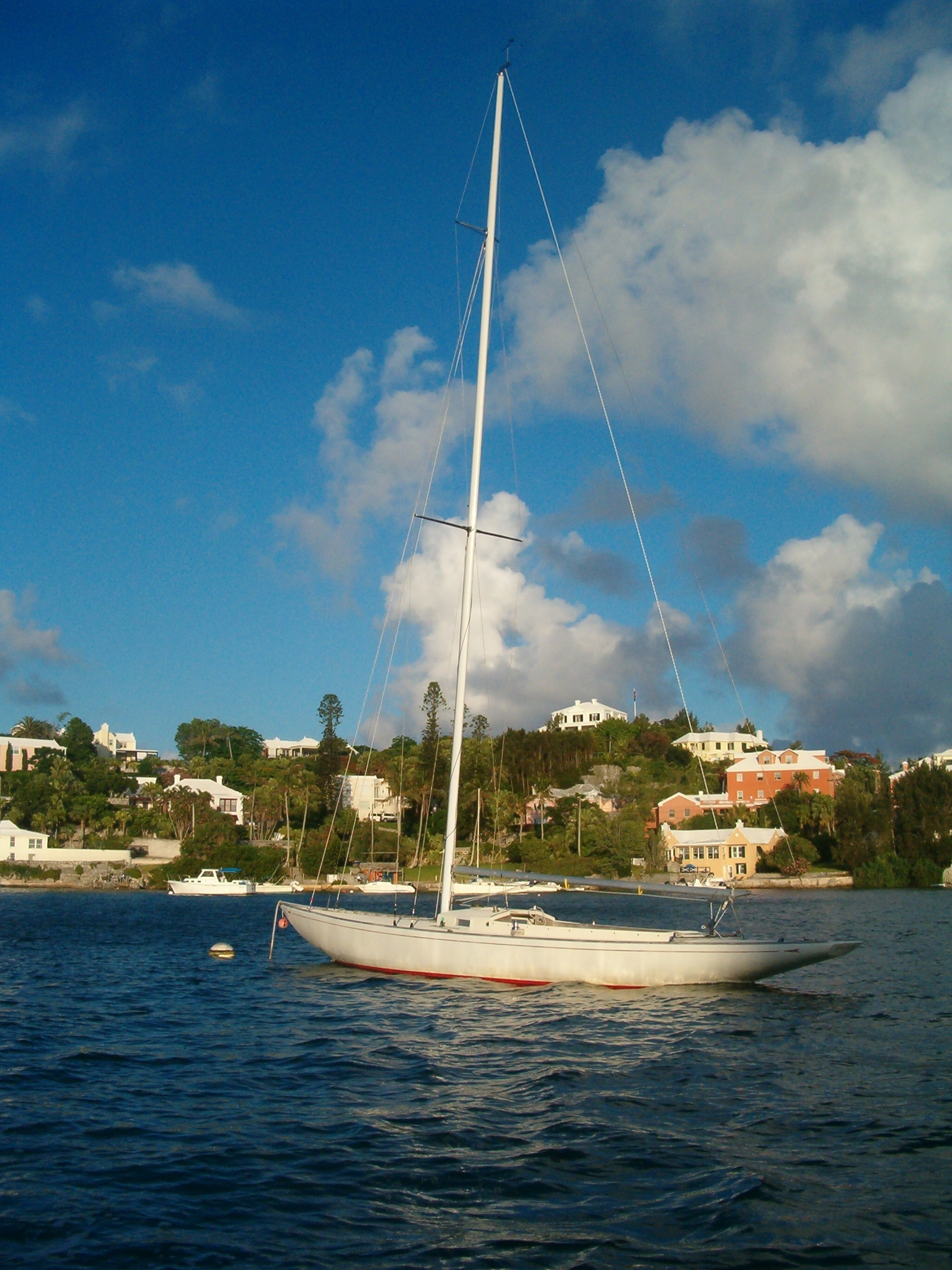
An IOD racer on a mooring in Hamilton Harbour

The Government announced in 2006 that it would provide substantial financial support to Bermuda's cricket and football teams. Football did not become popular with Bermudians until after the Second World War. Bermuda's most prominent footballers are Clyde Best, Shaun Goater, Kyle Lightbourne, Reggie Lambe, Sam Nusum and Nahki Wells. In 2006, the Bermuda Hogges were formed as the nation's first professional football team to raise the standard of play for the Bermuda national football team. The team played in the United Soccer Leagues Second Division but folded in 2013.

Sailing, fishing and equestrian sports are popular with both residents and visitors alike. The prestigious Newport–Bermuda Yacht Race is a more than 100-year-old tradition, with boats racing between Newport, Rhode Island, and Bermuda. In 2007, the 16th biennial Marion-Bermuda yacht race occurred. A sport unique to Bermuda is racing the Bermuda Fitted Dinghy. International One Design racing also originated in Bermuda.

At the 2004 Summer Olympics, Bermuda competed in sailing, athletics, swimming, diving, triathlon and equestrian events. In those Olympics, Bermuda's Katura Horton-Perinchief made history by becoming the first black female diver to compete in the Olympic Games. Bermuda has had two Olympic medallists, Clarence Hill – who won a bronze medal in boxing – and Flora Duffy, who won a gold medal in triathlon. It is tradition for Bermuda to march in the Opening Ceremony in Bermuda shorts, regardless of the summer or winter Olympic celebration. Bermuda also competes in the biennial Island Games, which it hosted in 2013.

In 1998, Bermuda established its own basketball association.

== See also ==
- Economy of Bermuda
- Index of Bermuda-related articles
- Notable cultural people of Bermuda
- Notable historical people of Bermuda
- Notable political people of Bermuda
- Notable sporting people of Bermuda
- Outline of Bermuda
- Places of interest in Bermuda
- Telecommunications in Bermuda
- Bermuda Triangle
