= Culture of Bermuda =

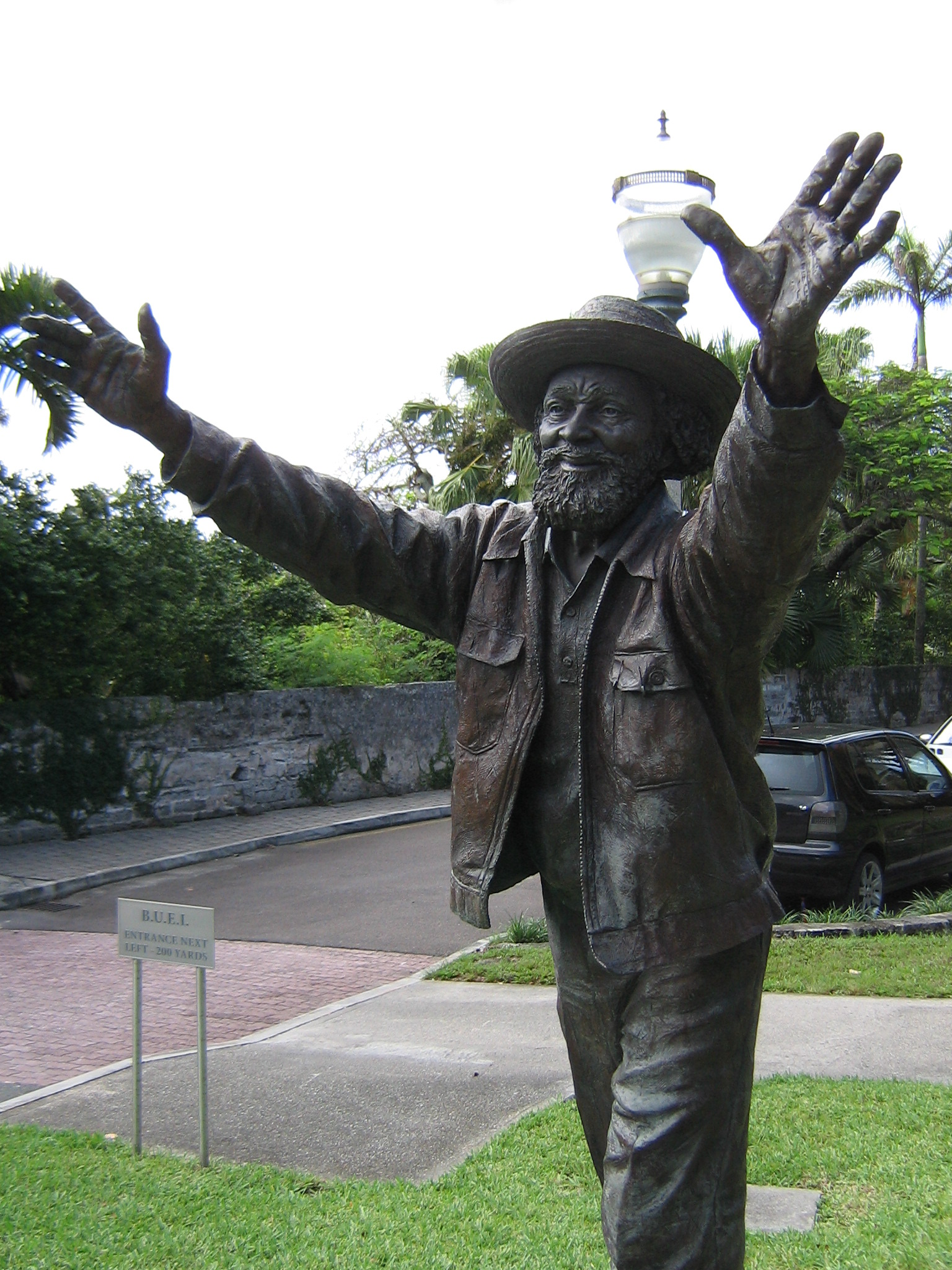
Statue of Johnny Barnes, located near the Bermuda Underwater Exploration Institute.

The culture of Bermuda reflects the heritage of its people, who are chiefly of Native American, African, and European descent. A small percentage of Asians also live on the island. Although Bermuda is an overseas territory of the United Kingdom, it also has strong historical links with the United States. On one hand, Bermudians seem British in their customs - for example, playing cricket, driving on the left, and having Queen Elizabeth II on their banknotes. At the same time, a strong North American cultural influence is obvious: the currency is on par with the US Dollar; Bermudians frequently watch television from the US. Dress in Bermuda, however, is distinct from either American or British styles. While in the US or the United Kingdom, shorts are considered casual dress, Bermuda shorts are considered to be formal attire in Bermuda, and are worn with a jacket and tie.

Bermudians may seem more conservative than people in the UK or North America, and are more concerned with etiquette. The islanders highly value protocol, and place a great emphasis on pomp and ceremony. For example, to ask somebody for directions in Bermuda without first saying 'good morning' or 'good afternoon' is considered to be abrupt and rude. This causes misunderstandings and embarrassment on the part of many US or British visitors, for whom this is perfectly normal, and who intend no offense. Topless sunbathing is not simply frowned upon as immodest - it is against the law.

However, Bermudians can also be tolerant of behaviour that would be considered eccentric elsewhere. One example is Johnny Barnes, a retired bus driver who stood by the road in Hamilton, greeting commuters on their way to work, often by name, wishing them a good morning, and telling them all I love you!. So great is the esteem in which he is held locally that a statue of him now stands in Hamilton.

== Literature ==
Bermuda's early literary history was largely limited to non-Bermudian writers commenting on the island. These included John Smith's The Generall Historie of Virginia, New-England, and the Summer Isles (1624), and Edmund Waller's poem, Battle of the Summer Islands (1645). In the 20th century, a large number of books were written and published locally, though few were aimed at a wider market than Bermuda (most of these being scholarly reference books, rather than creative writing). One Bermudian novelist, Brian Burland, has achieved a degree of success and acclaim internationally, although the first (and undoubtedly the most important, historically) notable book credited to a Bermudian was the History of Mary Prince, a slave narrative by a Bermudian woman, Mary Prince, which helped to end slavery in the British Empire. Bermuda's proximity to the United States means that many aspects of US culture are reflected or incorporated into Bermudian culture. Many non-Bermudian writers have also made Bermuda their home, or have had homes there, including A.J. Cronin and F. Van Wyck Mason, who wrote on Bermudian subjects.

== Music ==
A traditional form of music and dance is known as The Bermuda Gombey, which is of West African derivation, and involves rhythmic chanting and rapid drumbeat. The Gombey incorporates traditional West African dance with components from Christian missionaries, British soldiers and peoples of continental North America and the Caribbean. Also encountered in the Bahamas, the Bermudian version of the dance involves the use of the British military snare drum, beaten with wooden sticks. This practice stems from the fact that many slaves worked in British military bases. These dances are traditionally performed on New Year's Day, Boxing Day, and 24 May (Bermuda Day).

== Notable cultural figures ==
=== 1900 to 1950 ===
- Gordon Thomas (1916 in Bermuda – 2016) played outsider music
- Lance Hayward (1916 in Bermuda – 1991) was a jazz pianist, he settled in New York City at the age of 50.
- Phyllis Simmons Brooks (1926 in Bermuda – 2012 in Canada) emigrated to Canada in 1945, was a Canadian educator. After retiring from teaching, she taught adult literacy courses.
- Brian Burland (1931 in Bermuda – 2010 in Bermuda) was a Bermudian writer, poet and author of nine acclaimed novels that typically dealt with colonialism, family strife and race
- David B. Wingate OBE (born 1935 in Bermuda) is an ornithologist, naturalist and conservationist. He rediscovered the black-capped petrel in Haiti in 1963.
- Michael Mortimore (1937 in Bermuda – 2017 in Somerset) was a British geographer and a prolific researcher of issues in the African drylands. He speaks with some authority about 'desertification'.
- Michael K. Frith (born 1941 in Bermuda) is a director, consultant, designer and puppeteer; contributed extensively to The Muppets
- Angela Barry (born Bermuda c.1950) is a Bermudian writer, educator and lecturer. Her creative writing reflects her connections with the African diaspora, and as a PhD student at Lancaster University she worked on cross-cultural projects

=== 1950 to date ===
- Gina Swainson (born 1958 in Bermuda) is a Bermudian model and beauty queen who won Miss World 1979
- David Morris (born 1964 in Bermuda) is a musician who is best known as the frontman for Cold Water Army, and his current band Bag We Bag
- Heather Nova (born 1967 in Bermuda) is a Bermudian singer-songwriter and poet
- Kenneth Amis (born 1970 in Bermuda) is a tuba player and composer
- Mishka (born Alexander Mishka Frith in Bermuda in 1974) is a reggae musician
- Jon McGregor (born 1976 in Bermuda) is a British novelist and short story writer. In 2002, his first novel was longlisted for the Booker Prize as its youngest contender
- Kieran O'Neill (born 1987 In Bermuda) is an English entrepreneur known for founding several Internet companies. He co-founded Playfire, the largest social network for video games and is currently CEO of a fashion startup company. He moved to England when he was 14 and currently lives in London
- B. Dylan Hollis (born 1995 in Bermuda) is a Bermudian-American TikTok influencer, baker, and author. He is best known for showcasing unusual vintage American recipes.
- Jordan Claire Robbins is a Bermudian model and actress.

== See also ==
- Bermuda Scout Association
- Girlguiding Bermuda
- Gombey
- Sports and recreation in Bermuda
