= Playfire =

Gaming social network

- Playfire logo
- Website type: Social network service
- Available in: English
- Founded: December 2007 in London, UK
- Dissolved: 30 May 2017
- Headquarters: London, United Kingdom
- Area served: Worldwide
- Founders: Kieran O'Neill, Sophia Hayes, Ben Phillips
- Key people: Paul Sulyok (Co-Founder & CEO Green Man Gaming & Playfire)
- Industry: Social networking service, video games
- Commercial: Yes
- Registration: Required
- Launched: 30 March 2008
- Current status: Inactive

Playfire was a social gaming networking website targeted towards core video game players. Playfire allowed users the ability to automatically track their in-game achievements, trophies, and gameplay, as well as earn rewards for playing their games.

== History ==
The company was founded in December 2007 by Kieran O'Neill, Sophia Hayes & Ben Phillips and Playfire was first launched into private beta in March 2008. A public beta followed in June 2008. Playfire secured £1.3m Funding in November 2009, and went on to be acquired by Green Man Gaming in 2012. At the time of acquisition, Playfire had more than 1.2 million users tracking over 50,000 video games on the website.

Before creating Playfire, two of the Playfire founders had started and ran a PlayStation 3 focused news and forums website called PlayStation Universe. The idea for Playfire came from observing how gamers included information about themselves such as their PSN ID, recently played games and other things in their signatures below each forum post.

Playfire was the first website to release a PlayStation gamercard which attracted a large number of gamers to the service. The site iterated through a number of features, and introduced automatic tracking of Xbox 360, PlayStation 3 and PC gameplay in March 2011.

In September 2011 Playfire partnered with GameSpot to bring Playfire users profile to GameSpot through an API partnership.

On 9 July 2012 Playfire was acquired by digital games retailer Green Man Gaming.

At the end of 2013, Green Man Gaming announced that its Playfire service was able to track in-game achievements/trophies and gameplay on Xbox One and PlayStation 4.

In January 2014, Playfire launched its Rewards BETA. the Rewards BETA encourages users to link their Steam account to their Playfire account in order to earn Green Man Gaming store Credit. Available Rewards are listed daily on the Playfire Rewards. Page and by May 2014, over one million Rewards had been given out to BETA participants

Playfire sponsored the Most Played Game Award at the 32nd Golden Joystick Awards, and sponsored the Gamers' Choice Award at the Games Media Awards 2014 in October 2014.

In blog post on 7 November 2016, Green Man Gaming announced that Playfire is closing. It will be merged with their new "Community" site that GMG made on the Muut platform. Later, on 5 May 2017 Green Man Gaming announced Playfire is coming to a close this year. As of 30 May 2017 Playfire was merged with GMG Community with its website playfire.com now redirecting to greenmangaming.com/playfire.

== Investment ==
Playfire initially raised £1.3m in funding from investors including Niklas Zennström (the founder of Skype), Michael Birch (the founder of Bebo), Chris Deering (the former Chairman of SCE), William Reeve (the founder of LOVEFiLM) and others.
