= Scouting and Guiding in Bermuda =

Scouting and Guiding movement in Bermuda

The Scout and Guide movement in Bermuda is served by

- Girlguiding Bermuda
- Bermuda Scout Association
