= Artificial hair integrations =

Hair that artificially adds length to human hair

Artificial hair integrations, more commonly known as hair extensions, hair weaves, or fake hair, are cosmetic treatments which add length to human hair. Hair extensions are usually clipped, glued, or sewn on natural hair by incorporating additional human or synthetic hair. These methods include tape-in extensions, clip-in or clip-on extensions, micro/nano rings, fusion method, weaving method, and wigs. Wigs and hair extensions are commonly worn by Black women, by Orthodox Jewish women, and by people with medical conditions or experiencing side effects from medical treatments.

== Background ==
A hair weave is a human or artificial hair utilized for integration with one's natural hair. Weaves can alter one's appearance for long or short periods of time by adding further hair to one's natural hair or by covering the natural hair together with human or synthetic hairpieces. Weaving additional human or synthetic pieces can enhance one's hair by giving it volume and length, and by adding color without the damage of chemicals or by adopting a different hair texture than that of their own. However, hair loss can occur either along the front hairline or above the ears due to the wearing of specific hairstyles, such as weaves, for a prolonged period of time. It can cause breakage like splitting the ends of the hair. Also it can damage the hair follicles at the roots i.e. scalp. When this happens a permanent change of hair loss happens this is known as traction alopecia.

By the late 17th century, wigs in various shapes and sizes became the latest fashion trend. Hair weaves emerged in the 1950s, though at that time celebrities were the only ones using them. When the "long, disco-haired" era came about in the 1970s, hair weaves became widespread. Since that time, hair weaves have only become more popular. Dorothy Matthews-Paynter introduced weaves to Bermuda. Most human hair weaves come from Asian countries like Vietnam, India, and China.

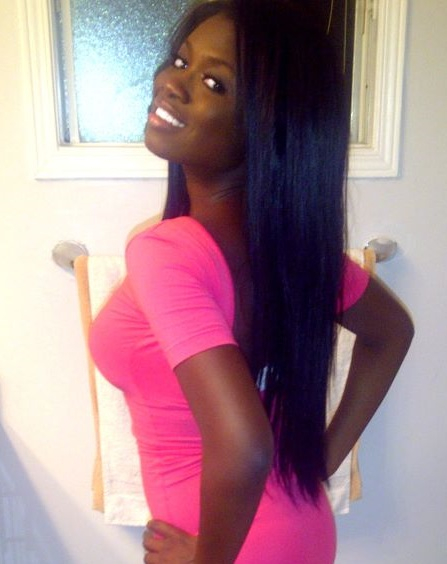
Final product of fully installed human hair weave extensions

hair extension

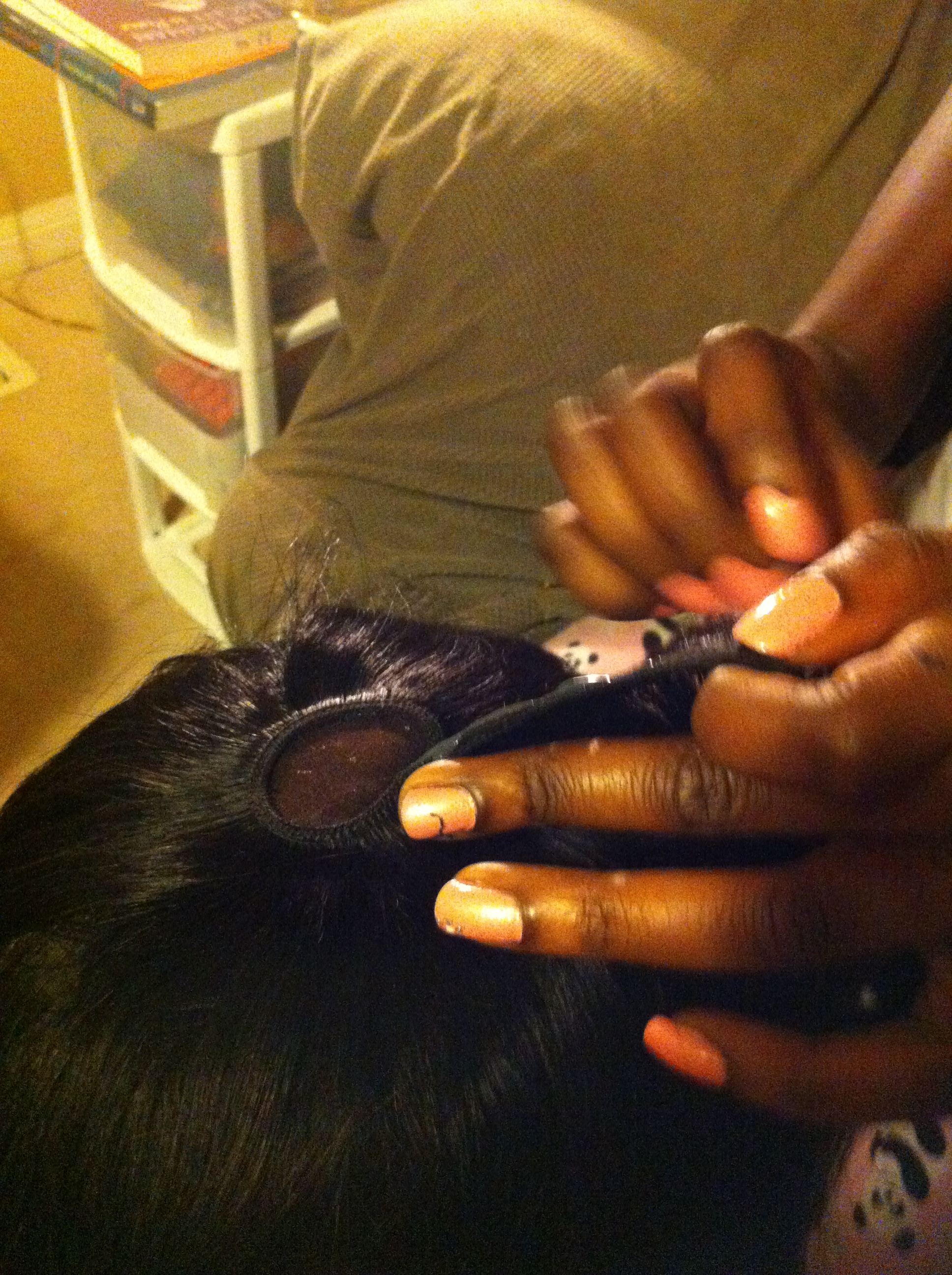
The glued netting process near completion

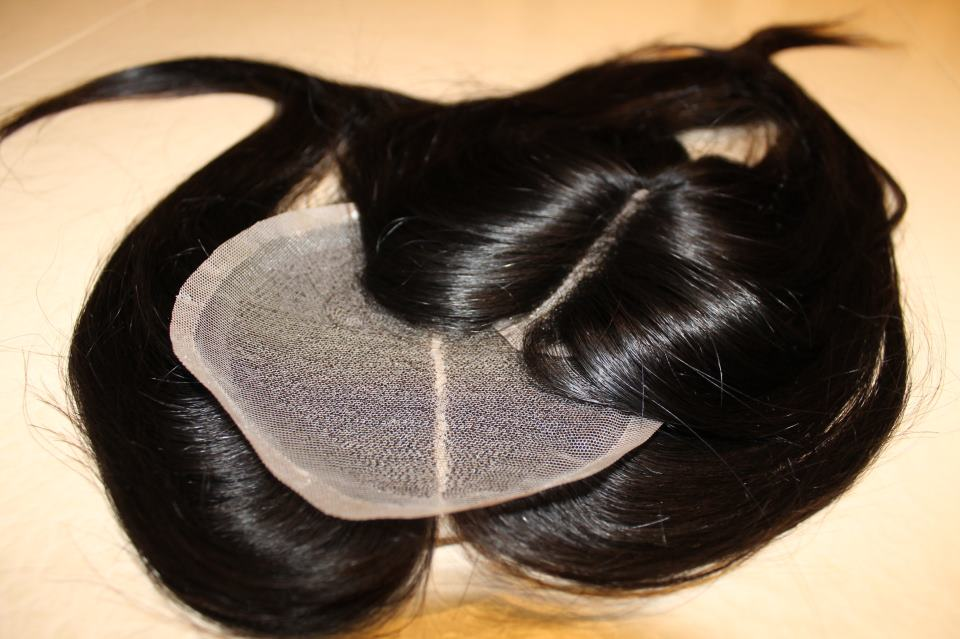
Section of a lace front used to close a weave (also called a lace or closure)

== Types of hair ==
The most popular and commonly available form of hair is known as premium hair. It is sold in most beauty supply stores or online. The roots and tips of hairs are interwoven in premium hair which causes tangling. This is due to the opposing cuticle layers catching onto one another. However, as it is the most inexpensive type of hair, it is a best seller.

Premium hair comes in two types:

- Regular premium hair: generally the least expensive type of hair. The cuticles are present in different directions and the hair is prone to tangling.
- "Tangle-free" premium hair: this is obtained by chemically removing the cuticles using an acid bath. This process reduces the friction among hairs, leaving the remaining hair tangle-free. In order to give the appearance of natural healthy hair, a laminate is applied to the hair to give it a shiny and silky look.

=== Synthetic fiber ===
Synthetic fibers are made of various different materials and contain no human hair. Synthetic fibers come in weave (weft) and single strands (bulk) for braids. They do not last as long as human hair because they can be easily damaged by friction and heat. The quality of fibers varies greatly. Depending on quality, they may never look like human hair, as they can be stiff and move differently from human hair. Synthetic fibers are much less expensive than human hair. Heating appliances such as curling irons, flat irons, and straightening combs generally should never be used on most types of synthetic hair. There are some newer versions of synthetic fibers that are more resistant, human-like fibers that can be heat processed allowing for heat styling.

The most widely used type of fiber is Kanekalon, developed by the Japanese Kaneka Corporation in the 1950s. It was originally an acrylic fiber but was superseded by a version originally designated "Kanekalon N", which is a modacrylic copolymer of 60% acrylonitrile and 40% vinyl chloride, where the latter imparts flame retardant properties.

Another polyester fiber developed by the Kaneka Corporation is Futura, which can withstand heat up to 400 °F (200 °C; although the temperature recommended by the manufacturer is only 180 °C), and is a long lasting alternative to human hair. It has a human hair-like appearance, a natural flow and good combing. It can be straightened or curled, however, it takes longer to set and futura cannot be colored. It is sometimes sold as a human hair blend.

=== Human hair ===
The selling of human hair for weaves, wigs, and other hair styling products is an industry that generates hundreds of millions of dollars annually and is growing as a large export economy in some Asian countries, such as India, at a rate of 10–30 percent annually. The largest exporters of human hair are India, Singapore, and Pakistan; the largest importers are Burma, Austria, and India. The top exporters of wigs and hair pieces are China, North Korea, and Indonesia. The top importers of manufactured hair pieces made with human hair are the U.S., China, and Nigeria.

In India, a large portion of the hair is sourced from Hindu temples where hair is shaved in a religious practice in honor of the Hindu god venkateswara swamy (Balaji). This hair is highly sought out for its "virgin" untreated qualities, as well as its great length. From there the hair is cleaned and the color can be altered for international style tastes. Tonsured hair from India is among the most valuable in the world. In 2004 and again in 2017, Israeli rabbis banned the use of tonsured hair for Jewish women's wigs worn to observe modesty rules, saying that the fact that it is collected as part of a non-Jewish religious ritual renders it unacceptable.

== Methods of integration ==
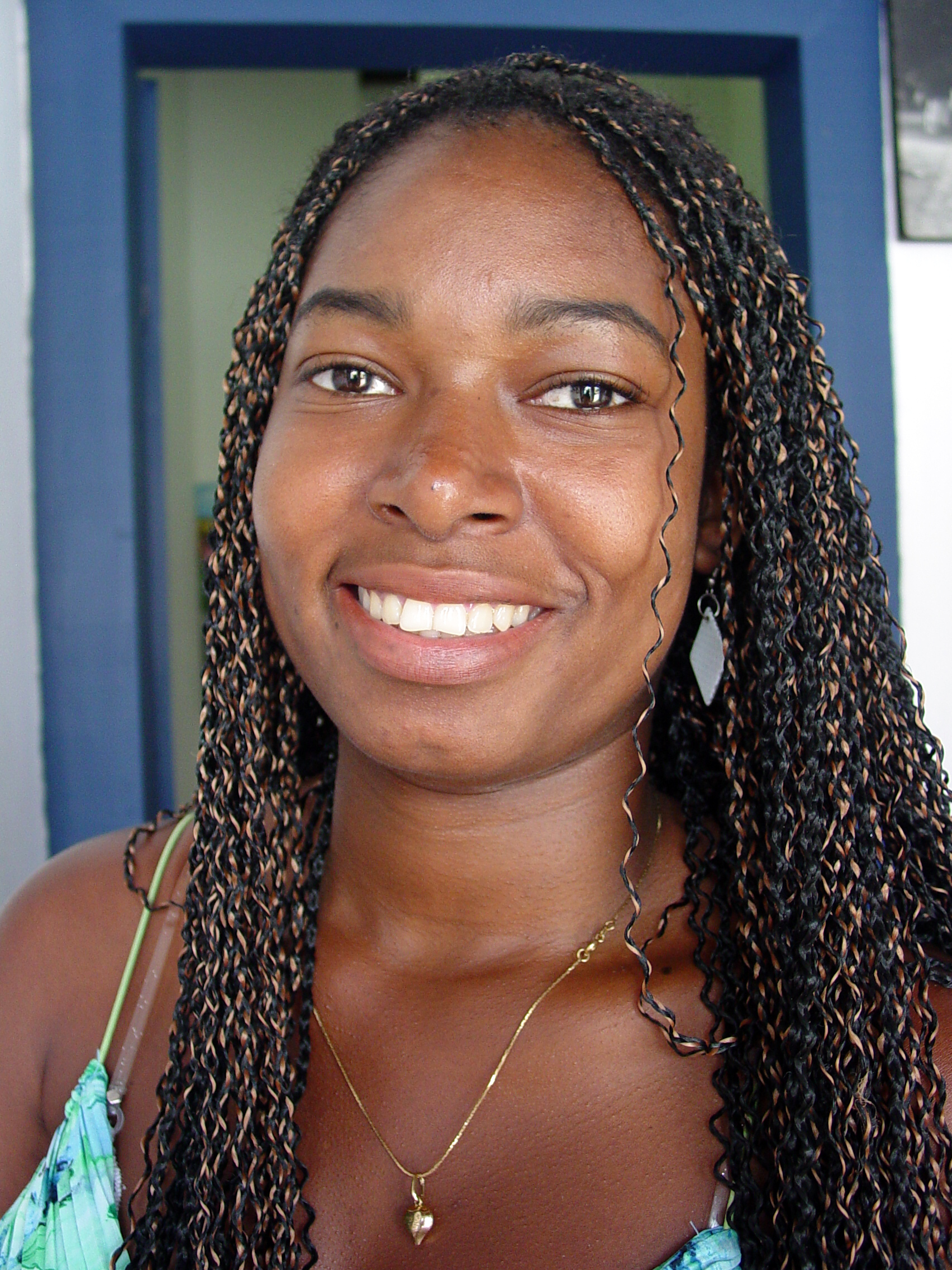
A young woman with multi-colored extensions braided into her hair

The misnomer of 'tracks' comes from the common, long-lasting method of integrating wefts, known as the 'track and sew' method. The 'tracks' are usually cornrows, braided in the direction of how the hair will fall. Toward the face or away, with or without a part, the tracks build the foundation of how the result will look. The wefts are then sewn onto the braids, usually with a specially made, blunt-ended needle. The needle can be curved or straight. There are many different colors of specially-made thread to choose from, depending on what color of hair you will be integrating. Darker hair lends to darker thread. When the hair is braided at a high level of tension, the client is at risk for traction alopecia.

Wefts may also be bonded directly to the clients' hair using special bonding glue. Care must be taken not to bond the wefts directly to the scalp, as it can cause sensitivities in some clients. A patch test is frequently recommended, as per manufacturer's directions. Glue has become less popular since it was discovered that glue can cause severe and often permanent health issues such as headaches, bald spots and dermatitis.

The "invisible part" is a technique used by hair stylists that hides any evidence that the person is wearing an extension. The extension will appear as if it is growing directly from the person's scalp. This look can be achieved with either the sew-in or glue method. This technique allows a long lasting method of attaching commercial hair to the natural hair. Application generally takes about an hour. It will last about 8 weeks.

Bulk hair can also be bonded to the hair, using many different methods, from clips to adhesive.

In South East Asia, the practical method of lengthening-re-bondage has been in use since the mid-19th century. The lengthening-re-bondage method consists of two treatments. The first treatment consists of re-bonding and ironing. The second treatment of lengthening-re-bondage involves gentle pulling and tugging of the hair. These two treatments are highly effective in lengthening hair without causing serious damage.

Bulk hair can also be added with thread if bonding is not suitable. This may be because the wearer has excessively oily hair or because there is a need to wash hair daily. Adding hair extensions with thread means that damage to the natural hair can be avoided and that the hair extension attachment areas are not vulnerable to external elements like heat, oils and water.

Wigs may use lace fronts to conceal the artificial attachment.

== See also ==
- List of hairstyles
- Christina Jenkins, stylist who patented weave technique
- Hair prosthesis
