= Kieran O'Neill =

British businessman (born 1987)

Kieran Lewis O'Neill (born 19 August 1987) is an English entrepreneur best known for founding several Internet companies.

He started one of the first video sharing websites, similar to YouTube, when he was 15 and sold it aged 19 for $1.25M. He studied management at the University of Bath before dropping out to pursue business interests.

He subsequently co-founded Playfire, the largest social network for video games. Playfire raised $3.1M in funding from prominent investors including Niklas Zennström (the founder of Skype), Michael Birch (the founder of Bebo), Chris Deering (the former chairman of Sony), William Reeve (the founder of LoveFilm) and others. The company grew to over to 1 million users and was subsequently acquired by a games retailer in May 2012.

O'Neill was a co-founder and CEO of fashion startup Thread.com. British Vogue included Thread in their 2012 list of the top 100 fashion websites, saying the service offered personal styling online for free. In June 2016, Beringea led a £4 million funding round with participation from existing backer Balderton Capital and a number of angel investors, bringing total funding for Thread to around $16 million. Another funding round in October 2018 raised £17m, led by the fashion chain H&M which had also participated in the 2016 funding round. Thread ceased trading and was placed in administration in 2022; at the same time, Marks & Spencer acquired Thread's brand and technology, and hired O'Neill alongside some former Thread staff.

O'Neill was born in Bermuda and moved to Winchester, England when he was 14.
