= Brian Burland =

Bermudian novelist (1931–2010)

- Born: Brian Berkeley Burland; 23 April 1931; Bermuda
- Died: 11 February 2010 (aged 78); Bermuda
- Occupations: Novelist and poet

Brian Burland (23 April 1931 – 11 February 2010) was a Bermudian writer, who was the author of nine acclaimed novels that typically dealt with colonialism, family strife and race. He was also a published poet. Burland was the first Bermudian novelist to receive international acclaim.

== Early years ==
Brian Berkeley Burland was born in Bermuda in 1931, to Gordon Burland and his wife Honor (née Gosling), and was one of four siblings. His was a privileged family background, but from an early age Brian was very conscious of Bermuda's racial inequalities and empathised with black Bermudians: "An important figure in his early life was Sarah Hinson, his black Bermudian nanny who... appears in his novel The Flight of the Cavalier as a heroic figure. Burland's family honoured his request to be buried next to her at St. Paul's Church, Paget."

== Education ==
Burland began his education at Saltus Grammar School in Hamilton, Bermuda, before being sent to England in 1944 as a boarder to Aldenham School in Hertfordshire. His experiences on the ship crossing the Atlantic crossing during World War II would be evoked in his early novel A Fall from Aloft (1968). Burland subsequently attended the University of Western Ontario in Canada, where he took a graduate English course, but dropped out without graduating. Travelling to Ireland, he began working on his first novel.

On the death of his father in 1951, Burland returned to Bermuda and worked in the family construction company for five years. During this time he played with a black cricket team, "which raised eyebrows from blacks and whites... and gave him material for his novels." In 1956, he sold his interest in the company, and, aged 26, went to Jamaica. There he met Noël Coward, who was impressed with a short story of Burland's.

== Publication ==
It was not until 1964, however, that Burland began to be published, with his first book, St. Nicholas in the Tub, being produced in the US. His next novel, A Fall From Aloft, was published in the United Kingdom in 1968, followed by A Few Flowers for St. George (1970), Undertow (1961) and in 1973, The Sailor and the Fox. Burland's other published novels are Surprise (1975), Stephen Decatur, the Devil and the Endymion (1975), Flight of the Cavalier (1980) and Love is a Durable Fire (1985). His papers include the manuscripts of five as yet unpublished novels.

=== Critical reception ===
Burland's novels were generally well reviewed in publications including The Observer, The Times Literary Supplement, The Spectator, The Times in London, the New Statesman and The New York Times, being praised by the likes of novelist Anthony Burgess, playwright David Rabe and actor Sir Ralph Richardson. In response to one rare, particularly negative review, Burland wrote a letter to The New York Times in July 1986, taking the reviewer to task:

"I am 55 years old. I have worked five days a week, 50 weeks a year, for over 30 years, as a novelist and poet. I set myself rather high standards: that unless the story is at once as unputdownable to a taxi driver as to a university professor, it is not good enough; that unless a novel is, at the end, quite clearly an epic poem, as well as a story, it is not good enough. My work has resulted in the publication of eight novels by 16 publishers, now adding up to 22 editions. At least something in my work has been praised by such readers as Conrad Aiken, Anthony Burgess, David Rabe, Noel Coward, Alan Harrington, Janice Elliott, Mark Van Doren, V. S. Pritchett and Alec Guinness.

Sometimes critics have found flaws in my work and pointed them out: a title they didn't think was good, a character, a technique. Yet in my whole career I have never received a review that totally dismissed a novel – my characters, my plot, my scene-setting – until Thomas Cook's assessment of 'Love Is a Durable Fire' (In Short, June 22)....

My novels have been reviewed in The Times by Martin Levin and Christopher Lehmann-Haupt, critics of large literary acumen who approached my books as works of serious fiction. Hence my disappointment in this superficial reading and irresponsible review."

== Personal life ==
Burland was married and divorced three times: to Charlotte Ann "Gale" Burland (with whom he had three children: Susan, Anne and William), to Edwina Trentham (mother of his son Benjamin) and finally to Ishbel Gibb Lee. He was the first Bermudian to convert to the Baháʼí Faith, in 1949, and said: "It's been an inspiration for all my writing and painting; it's a connection with a higher power."

Burland suffered from Huntington's disease in his later life and spent his last years at Westmeath Nursing Home and finally at Sylvia Richardson Care Facility. He died on 11 February 2010 at the age of 78. He was buried on 16 February 2010 at St. Paul's Church, Paget, following a Bahá'í memorial service at the church hall.

== Recognition, awards and legacy ==
In 1994, Burland received a Lifetime Achievement Award from the Bermuda Arts Council.

In 2001, the Bermudian government's Department of Community and Cultural Affairs established the Bermuda Literary Awards, and Burland won the Founder's Award and the prize for Children's and Young Adult Fiction. In 2007, the fiction award was renamed the Brian Burland Prize for Fiction.

After his death, Burland's family donated a collection of his original manuscripts, unpublished novels, poems, journals, correspondence and paintings, for educational use to Bermuda College, where on 9 May 2013 the Brian Burland Centre for Research was formally opened. Dedicated to preserving and promoting his works and as well as to encouraging aspiring Bermudian writers, the Centre features a specially commissioned mural by leading Bermudian artist Graham Foster that depicts imagery from four Burland novels: The Sailor and the Fox, Flight of the Cavalier, A Fall From Aloft, and Stephen Decatur, the Devil and the Endymion.

A special course is to be taught at Bermuda College on the work of Brian Burland, whom Angela Barry of the Burland Collection Committee has described as "the greatest writer never to be known or acknowledged in the country of his birth".

== Bibliography ==
- St. Nicholas and the Tub (for children; illustrated by Joseph Low), New York: Holiday House, 1964; 2000
- A Fall from Aloft, Barrie & Rockliff, 1968; Random House, 1969; W. W. Norton, 1986; Paladin Books, 1987
- A Few Flowers for St. George, London: Barrie & Jenkins, the Cresset Press, 1969; Norton, 1986; Paladin Books, 1987
- Undertow, London: Barrie & Jenkins, 1971
- The Sailor and the Fox, New York: Hill & Wang; 1973; London: Eyre Methuen, 1973; Penguin Books, 1978
- Surprise, London: Allen & Unwin, 1974; Harper & Row, 1974; Penguin, 1978
- Stephen Decatur, the Devil, and the Endymion, London: Allen and Unwin, 1975
- The Flight of the Cavalier, London: W. H. Allen, 1980
- Love is a Durable Fire, W. W. Norton, 1985; HarperCollins, 1985
- Whatwanderwith, Norton, 1987
- Poems, 1998
