= Alfred Birdsey =

English-born Bermudian painter

- Born: 1912; England
- Died: 1996 (aged 83–84); Bermuda
- Education: Self-taught; studied under Donald Kirkpatrick
- Known for: Painting, watercolour
- Notable work: Bermudian landscapes and harbour scenes
- Style: Modernism; abstraction; Asian-inspired aesthetics
- Movement: Modern art in Bermuda
- Spouse: Wilma Birdsey
- Children: Joanne Birdsey Linberg

Alfred Birdsey (1912 – 1996) was an English-born Bermudian painter. He was the subject of a retrospective at the Masterworks Museum of Bermuda Art in September 2022–April 2023.

Born in England in 1912, he relocated to Bermuda in 1919.

Birdsey is considered one of the pioneers of modern art in Bermuda. Largely self-taught, he studied under local artist Donald Kirkpatrick and was influenced by Bauhaus artist Lionel Feininger, as well as visiting artist Joe Jones, and his mature style. Birdsey's work combined elements of abstraction and Asian aesthetics, especially in his watercolours, which were characterised by fluidity and simplicity. His approach to modernism was more intuitive than theoretical, and his paintings often depicted Bermudian landscapes and scenes from harbour life.

Birdsey was active as a professional artist for several decades and was among the few Bermudian artists able to earn a living solely from his work. He maintained a studio in Paget that served both as a gallery and a local attraction. His paintings and his welcoming personality made him a prominent figure in Bermuda’s cultural life, and his studio became a frequent stop for visitors interested in local art.

== Family ==
He was married to Wilma Birdsey, a nurse. His daughter, Joanne Birdsey Linberg, is also an artist. Joanne is married to Sjur Linberg, an architect. Alfred Birdsey collaborated with Sjur Linberg in creating a lithographic press to produce woodcuts and lithographs.
