= Dorothy Matthews-Paynter =

Bermudian hairstylist, beautician, and trichologist (1922-2024)

Dr. Dorothy Louise Matthews-Paynter
- Matthews-Paynter at her 100th birthday celebration in 2022
- Born: June 26, 1922; Paget Parish, Bermuda
- Died: July 23, 2024 (aged 102); Bermuda
- Occupations: Hairstylist, beautician, trichologist
- Awards: Badge of Honour

Dorothy Matthews-Paynter (1922–2024) was a Bermudian hairstylist, beautician, and trichologist. She operated her salon, Dottie's Unisex, at least through her 100th birthday. She was known for introducing the hair weave, the perm, precision cutting, and the cold perm to Bermuda. She was also Bermuda's only trichologist.

== Biography ==
Matthews was born on June 26, 1922, and raised in Paget Parish. By age 11, she was orphaned, and she was raised by her grandmother. At a young age, she was interested in becoming a hairdresser, a teacher and a lawyer.

She first did hairdressing for classmates at her school, which got her pocket money. At 13, she began working at a hospital, but quit after being harassed by an orderly. During World War II, she worked at the Everest Hotel: one of the guests she took meals to was former Nazi turned opponent Otto Strasser.

She finished high school through correspondence courses, and went on to travel to learn hair styles starting in 1952, studying cosmetology at the Apex College in New York. When she returned, she opened her first salon. In 1970, she moved to the location now known as Dottie's Unisex Beauty Center. During the 1960s and 1970s, she was credited with introducing many major hair techniques to Bermuda, including the hair weave, the perm, the cold wave, and precision cutting. This led her to become known as the "Queen B" of Bermuda's hairstyling.

She earned her Bachelor's Degree in 1993 from the Dudley Cosmetology University, and earned her PhD from the same institution in 1996, becoming Bermuda's only PhD holder in cosmetology. She was also Bermuda's only certified trichologist and a practical nurse. She wrote multiple plays, which have been performed in Bermuda. She took off every August to travel, and threw large celebrations for her 90th and 100th birthdays. Governor Rena Lalgie also held a tea in honor of her 100th birthday.

She was awarded a Badge of Honour in 1997 for her community fundraisers, including her cut-a-thon, which she held for more than 50 years. She was a founding member of the Bermuda Business and Professional Women's Society, later led by Neletha Butterfield. She is the subject of a book, The Life and Times of a Bermudian Legend, Dr. Dorothy Matthews-Paynter.

She stated she would never stop working at her salon until her death, stating "End, what end?... The shop keeps me going." and later "Hairdressers never die, they just curl away." As of her 100th birthday, she was still actively running her salon.

On July 23, 2024, her death was announced by a funeral home. She was mourned by Bermuda Senate President Joan Dillas-Wright and Bermuda Premier David Burt, among others.
