= Gombey =

Bermudan performance art

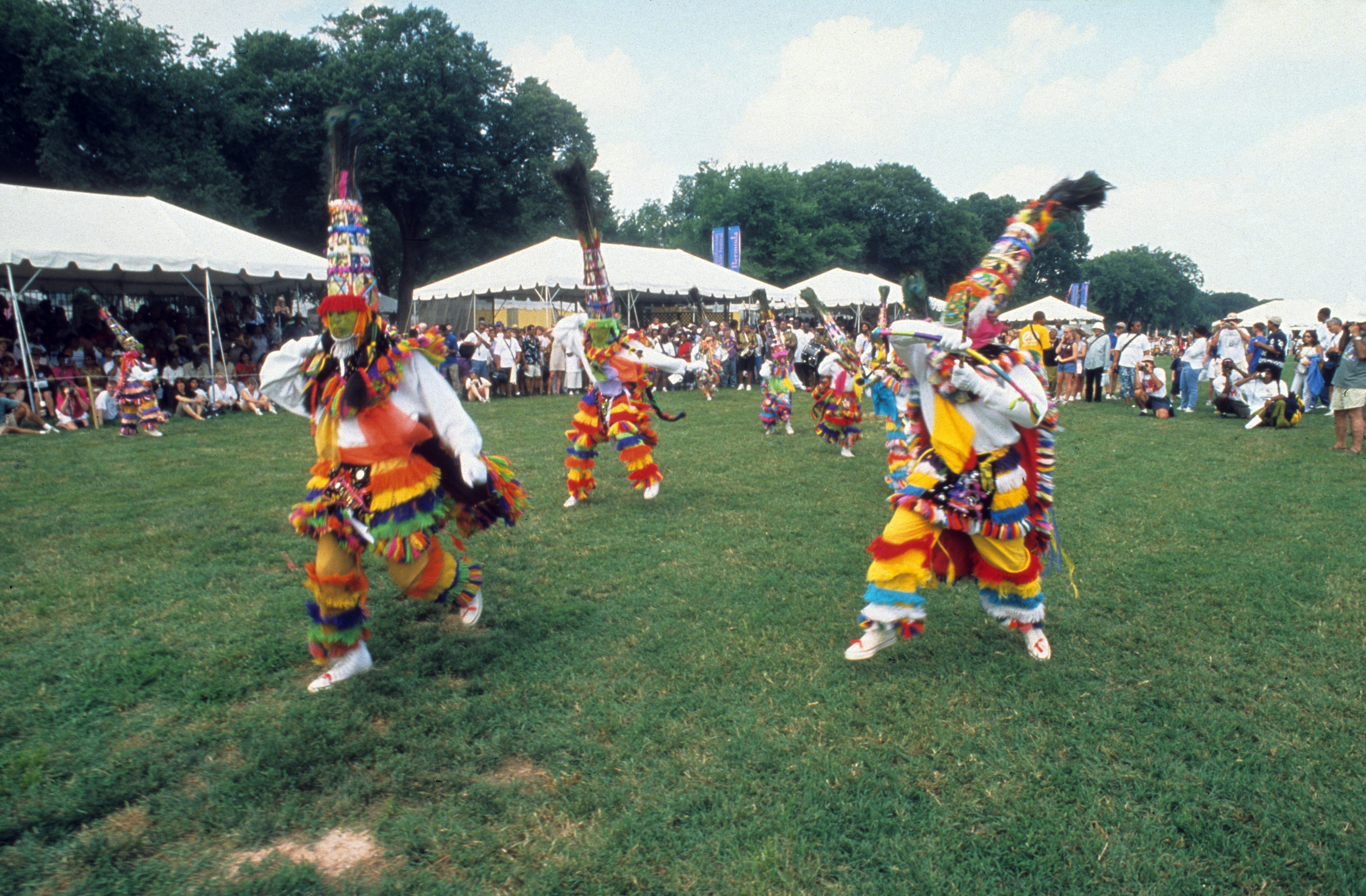
Gombey dancers at the Smithsonian Folklife Festival in 2001.

The Gombey is an iconic symbol of Bermuda, a cultural expression full of colorful and intricate masquerade, dance, and drumming. This folk tradition reflects the island's blend of African, Caribbean and British cultures with Indigenous influences.

Dancers are usually men and perform in groups of 10 to 30 though in modern times women's groups have emerged. The traditions have been passed down orally from one generation to the next within families. The captains of each troupe determine the troupe's style and direction. Subtle but distinct differences emerged between troupes in beats, dances, costumes, headdresses, by which each troupe can each be recognized.

== History ==
Historically, the Gombeys were not viewed as a respectable art form by the island's ruling class and were banned by the slave masters. Enslaved people were allowed to dance only once a year and did so in masks in order to protest, without fear of retribution, the injustices done them by their slave masters.

In an article from The Royal Gazette newspaper posted on January 10, 1831, a reward is being offered for the return of two slaves by the names of Ajax and Mentor who went off without a cause at Christmas, following that Idolatrous procession the Gumba. It is hoped that this late nuisance, the Gumba and other clamorous puppet shows of the Negroes, will meet the attention of all men of reflection that they be suppressed – as none but the worst or most ignorant Negroes follow such ridiculous shows."

Henceforth Gombey tradition is at its liveliest during the Christmas season, customarily performed during Boxing Day, where the troupes would march the whole day around the island with crowds of followers. Additional performances take place on Easter, New Year's Day, Bermuda Day, and in modern times at football and cricket matches and other festivals and celebrations.

=== Etymology and Bahamian roots ===
The word Gombey is related to the Bahamian Goombay, a similar musical tradition (though lacking costume and dance elements). It also refers to a specific drum of African origin (see List of Caribbean drums). In addition to the Bahamian Goombay tradition, Gombey is similar to some other Afro-Caribbean and other styles and celebrations (such as the Mummers and Morris dance). In Bermuda, Gombeys are seen more as dancers than musicians, with ritualised costumes, accoutrements, and the steps of a war dance that were recognised by Wampanoag dancers, whereas in the West Indies the term applies to a musical tradition not normally accompanied by dance. Cultural continuity would be expected not only with other British or formerly British territories in the Americas, but also with Latin America. Africans and people of African ancestry who formed part of Bermuda's 17th-century founding population came primarily from former Spanish colonies as free but indentured servants in the seventeenth century (until the terms of indenture were raised from seven to ninety-nine years as a discouragement). Most arrived as Spanish-speaking Catholics but later acculturated as English-speaking Protestants. Smaller numbers of slaves, many of African birth, were also captured from the Spanish and other enemies, survived shipwrecks on Bermuda's reef line, or were deliberately imported, and were sold in Bermuda. The Spanish were not heavily involved in the enslavement of Africans for the trans-Atlantic slave trade, instead primarily purchasing enslaved Africans from the Portuguese and Arabs, both of whom enslaved Africans in southern Africa, from Angola to Zanzibar.

== Genetic studies ==
This was understood from the written record, and confirmed in 2009 by a genetic survey, which looked exclusively at the Black (or, rather, "mixed race") population of St. David's Island (as the purpose of the study was to seek Native American haplogroups, which could be assumed to be absent from the white population) that consequently showed that the African ancestry of Black Bermudians (other than those resulting from recent immigration from the British West Indian islands) is largely from a band across southern Africa, from Angola to Mozambique, which is similar to what is revealed in Latin America, but distinctly different from the Blacks of the British West Indies and the United States.

68% of the mtDNA (maternal) lineages of the Black islanders were found to be African, with the two most common being L0a and L3e, which are sourced from populations spread from Central-West to South-East Africa. These lineages represent less than 5% of the mtDNA lineages of Blacks in the United States and the English-speaking West Indies. They are, however, common in Brazil and the Spanish-speaking countries of Latin America. L3e, by example, is typical of !Kung-speaking populations of the Kalahari, as well as of parts of Mozambique and Nigeria. The modern nation where it represents the highest percentage of the population is actually Brazil, where it represents 21% of mtDNA lineages. 31% of the mtDNA lineages of Blacks in Bermuda are West Eurasian (European), with J1c being the most common. 1% were Native American.

For NRY (paternal) haplogroups among Black Bermudians, the study found that about a third consisted of three African haplogroups, of which E1b1a—the most common NRY haplogroup in West and Central African populations—“accounted for the vast majority of the African NRY samples (83%).” The remainder (about 64.79%) were West Eurasian, with the exception of one individual (1.88%) who had a Native American NRY haplogroup, Q1a3a. Among individuals with European NRY haplogroups, more than half carried R1b1b2, which is common in Europe and found at frequencies exceeding 75% in England and Wales. None of these percentages can be taken as equivalent to the percentage of ancestry in the Black population from the specific regions as genetic drift tends to erase minority haplogroups over generations. This explains the near absence of Native American haplogroups despite the hundreds of Native Americans known to have been involuntarily brought to Bermuda in the 17th century.

== Instruments ==
In addition to the bass, or "Mother" drum, typically home-made the modern Bermudian Gombey is distinguished by the use of the snare drum (generally in pairs), derived from the British use of the instrument. In addition, a kettle drum and a fife are integral parts of Gombey accompaniment; whistles are used by leaders to issue commands. The snare drummers play complicated riffs over the steady pulse of the mother drum, often employing call and response patterns, and striking the rim of the snare, as well as the skin. The result is an exhilarating, intoxicating, rhythmic mix which provides the impulse (or impetus) for both the dancers as well as the followers, with the snare drum patterns driving the body of the movement and the rimshots communicating with the dancer's feet.

== Attire ==
Gombey's costumes cover their bodies from head to toe and are decorated with tassels, mirrors, bells, and other small items and symbols. The peacock feather headdresses, the painted masks, and the capes are distinguishing features of Gombey costumes. Many adornments of the costumes as worn today rely on modern materials or items, such as the Asian peacock feathers, that would have been hard or impossible to come by before the 20th century, but there is little record of the original costume worn, so how it has changed since the 19th century can only be guessed at. Susette Harriet Lloyd in 1835 (see below) described them using "plentiful bedaubing of red and yellow paints, scarlet cloth, flowers and ribbons", but made no reference to the design of their clothing or the use of feathers.

Although the Gombeys have enjoyed a remarkable shift in social status, going from a marginalized group to now appearing on postage stamps and performing overseas, there are still today old laws in place that prevent Gombeys from performing in the streets of Hamilton without permits.

== Dance ==
The Gombey troupe's dance was clearly once a war dance, with the troupe member called The Bowman or Lead Indian carrying a bow and arrow and often going slightly ahead of the troupe to scout the way on long marches, and the Warriors carrying tomahawks, which they place on their shoulders and use during cockfights when they face off against each other, and the steps were recognised by Wampanoag dancers after the Wampanoag and Pequots began a series of Reconnection festivals with Bermudians in 2000.

== Research and education ==
In February 2000, the Smithsonian Institution conducted training in folklife fieldwork for Bermuda-based researchers to prepare them to survey the cultural traditions of the island. Their fieldwork, conducted from April 2000 through March 2001, became the research basis for both the Folklife Festival, the development of the Bermuda Connections Cultural Resource Guide for Classrooms, and the development of a Bermuda Folklife Officer.

Dr. Richard Kurin writes in the foreword that "[t]his education kit grows out of Bermuda's participation in the 2001 Smithsonian Folklife Festival. It is based on the important research that went into the Festival and the documentation that resulted from it." Included in this document is a chapter on Gombeys, Bands and Troubadours. Since 2010 the entire Bermuda Connections Resource Guide has been made available for download in the Folklife section of Bermuda's Department of Community and Cultural Affairs website.

== Literature ==
Susette Harriet Lloyd (who travelled to Bermuda with the Church of England's Archdeacon of Bermuda Aubrey Spencer aboard HMS Wanderer and remained in Bermuda for two years) published Sketches of Bermuda (a collection of letters she had written en route to, and during her stay in, Bermuda, and dedicated to Archdeacon Spencer) in 1835, immediately following the 1834 abolition of slavery in Bermuda and the remainder of the British Empire (Bermuda elected to end slavery immediately, becoming the first colony to do so, though all other British colonies except for Antigua availed themselves of an allowance made by the Imperial government enabling them to phase slavery out gradually), writing of Gombeys:

Some most Caliban looking negroes have just been dancing on the lawn; for in this season of general festivity, they are all permitted to indulge in the wildest mirth and revelry. The oldest among them participates with the child in the delights of their Gombey-a show which reminds me of the 'Jack-in-the-Green' scenes of our May-day chimney-sweepers. Here nature clothes them with their dusky livery, and they endeavour to heighten the effect by a plentiful bedaubing of red and yellow paints, scarlet cloth, flowers and ribbons. They completely besieged my room, which opens on the garden, so that I was forced to remain a close prisoner, and listen to their rude songs, which I should fancy must be very like the wild yelling scream that we read of in African travels. How much would the diffusion of true christian principles do for these poor people, by teaching them the real nature of rejoicing, and the folly of all these superstitious festivities. The most famous Gombey parties are those of Hamilton and Hearne Bay; they were preceded by really tolerable bands, composed of negroes dressed in a neat white uniform with scarlet facings. These musicians are all self-taught, and play many favourite airs with great accuracy. This is the more surprising, since they do not know a single note in music. They learn and play every thing by ear, and certainly have great natural taste, and love for music.

One of the first major literary publications on the Gombeys was a book published in 1987 by Louise A. Jackson entitled The Bermuda Gombey: Bermuda's Unique Dance Heritage. It contains pictures and sketches of Gombeys, and outlines details of history, group roles, performance and costumes. Jackson subsequently also published another book, entitled Gombey Boy, and a short narrative film on VHS. More recently a children's book called Gombey Baby was written and illustrated by Bermudian J. K. Aspinall.

== Film ==
The Department of Community and Cultural Affairs, Bermuda, sponsored a feature-length documentary Behind the Mask: Bermuda Gombeys Past, Present, and Future (2008), this film captures and documents the ongoing history of the Bermuda Gombeys, highlighting their importance as one of Bermuda's oldest folklife traditions. It premiered at the Bermuda International Film Festival in March 2008. The documentary was directed by Bermudian filmmaker Adrian Kawaley-Lathan, and co-produced with Bermudian filmmaker Kalilah Robinson.

== See also ==
- Culture of Bermuda
- Music of Bermuda
- Bermuda
