= Christina Jenkins =

American cosmetologist

Christina Jenkins (December 25, 1920 – November 23, 2003) was an African-American scientist and is considered a pioneer in cosmetology. Jenkins created an invention which presented a new way for women of color to utilize hair extensions for styles and coined the term "hair weave." She obtained a patent, and trained cosmetologists in the technique, and licensed cosmetologists to teach the technique.

== Biography ==
Christina Mae Jenkins was born December 25, 1920, in Louisiana and grew up in Texas and Louisiana. In 1943, she graduated with a degree in science at Leland College and married her husband, pianist, Herman "Duke" Jenkins. The couple relocated to Chicago, where Jenkins began working for a wig manufacturer in 1949. There, she started to develop a technique to make the company's wigs more secure to wear. This practice evolved into examining different ways to sew hair into women's natural hair. At first, Jenkins used pins and grips which she soon found to be bulky and unnatural looking. From this, her idea for hair extensions was born.

With her new technique, false hair, known as extensions, would be woven into women's natural hair to create a longer, fuller and even somewhat natural look. The hair would be woven into braids and cornrows. In 1951, Jenkins patented her process, which she called the Hair-Weev.

The Jenkins family relocated to Ohio in 1952, where Jenkins started her own training academy, Christina’s Academy of Hair-Weev. In 1959, they moved briefly to Miami Beach but shortly returned to Ohio, where she opened the Hair-Weev Training Division and Christina's Hair-Weev Penthouse Salon in Shaker Heights, Ohio, which she ran until 1993.

In December 2003, Ohio Congresswoman Stephanie Tubbs Jones commended Jenkins for her Hair-Weev invention, calling it a "revolutionary contribution."

Over the years, Jenkins' invention has evolved into braids, wigs, weaves, sew-ins, and clip-ins which have become very popular among the African American community. The market for hair extensions was valued at $3.35 billion USD annually in 2023. She is labeled as a cosmetology pioneer due to the popularity of her invention.

=== Teaching and instruction ===
Jenkins actively promoted the Hair-Weev technique and certified stylists in the method. In addition to Christina’s Academy of Hair-Weev, she founded the National Hair-Weev Association in 1960, through which cosmetologsist in other cities could open their own training programs. Jenkins also taught her techniques in Europe at hair shows.

=== Problems with patent enforcement ===
Despite the success of the patent passing, Jenkins found difficulties enforcing it. Many salons utilized the technique without proper permissions and licensing. The patent failed to offer Jenkins proper protection against piracy and was overturned in 1965 due to legal disputes.

Jenkins died in 2003 at the age of 83.

== See also ==
- Artificial hair integrations
- African-American hair
