= Citizens Uprooting Racism in Bermuda =

Citizens Uprooting Racism in Bermuda (CURB) is a non-governmental organisation of volunteers working to identify and dismantle racism in all its forms and to address its effects on the Bermudian community.

CURB initially formed following a meeting held on June 30, 1998 when nearly six hundred Bermudians and residents converged on the campus of the Bermuda College to brainstorm and recommend solutions for uprooting racism in Bermuda. A change in the political parties in November 1998 resulted in the newly formed organisation being unable to raise support from the new Government, and by 2000 the organisation became dormant.

In the Speech from the Throne 2005 delivered in November 2005 by the Duke of York, KCVO, ADC on the occasion of the convening of Parliament, the Government stated that it would "...facilitate and support the Human Rights Commission, the Commission for Unity and Racial Equality, and Non-Governmental Organisations in a major race relations initiative. Citizens Uprooting Racism in Bermuda - or CURB - will be the vehicle tasked with recommending to the Government tangible, achievable strategies for the elimination of racism in Bermuda."

In January 2006 the new CURB began to meet and drew up bye-laws and a constitution, which was later revised in January 2009. In September 2006 the organisation registered as a charity (Reg. No. 768) under The Charities Act 1978 and Charities Amendment Act 1998.

CURB gives presentations, forums, workshops, and training as well as engaging in political activism.

CURB has a Central Council consisting of up to 15 members, as well as working groups in Advocacy, Education, Research, Communication, Finance, and Strategic Planning.
