= Lance Hayward at the Half Moon Hotel =

Studio album by Lance Hayward
- Released: 1959
- Studio: Federal Records, Kingston
- Label: Island Records; CB21
- Producer: Chris Blackwell

Lance Hayward at the Half Moon Hotel (Note: Although the album cover uses the title Lance Haywood at the Half Moon Hotel, Montego Bay, most references exclude "Montego Bay." The back cover of the album says "Lance Haywood at Half Moon," which was not the title. The picture of the album cover that hangs in the Half Moon Hotel has Hayward's name corrected.) is a 1959 studio album by Bermudian jazz pianist Lance Hayward. It was both the debut solo album by Hayward and the first album released on Chris Blackwell's label Island Records. The original album cover calls the band leader "Lance Haywood" mistakenly, and contrary to the album's title, it was recorded in studio. Although the album is unremarkable artistically, it has gained recognition for its importance in the history and development of Caribbean music.

== History ==
Chris Blackwell, the son of Blanche Blackwell (famous for her relationship with Ian Fleming), was born in London in 1937 but soon after his birth moved to Jamaica. In 1945 he returned to England to attend a private Catholic school, and in 1950 entered Harrow School. Blackwell was removed from Harrow for his behaviour, and following a short apprenticeship with Price Waterhouse, in 1955 he returned to Jamaica. In 1959 Blackwell began working as the water ski instructor at the Half Moon Hotel, which was owned by his cousin Barbara DeLisser's father, Harold DeLisser. In their free time, Barbara and Chris frequented the local music venues and soon discovered a Bermudian jazz quartet led by the blind pianist Lance Hayward. Hayward had come to Jamaica for the first time in the winter of 1957–58, and returned for the winter of 1958–59. During his second season in Jamaica he met Ernest Ranglin. Barbara was impressed by the group and convinced her father to hire Hayward's group as the house band at the hotel for the 1959-60 winter. During the band's residence, Blackwell recounted, "I made friends with Lance and started to make rash promises about making a record with him, probably having drunk a couple of rums too many." Blackwell rented studio time at Federal Records from Ken Khouri to record the album. Although the date of the recording is unknown, it likely took place in late 1959. In 1960 the band recorded a follow-up album, Lance Hayward at the Half Moon Hotel, Volume 2.

In his memoirs, Blackwell said of the album, "I wouldn't call the Hayward recording a great, groundbreaking jazz album. It's a souvenir of a time and place and will take you to sunny, easygoing 1959 Montego Bay in an instant." Blackwell suggested that only around 200 copies sold, most of which were purchased by hotel guests as souvenirs. On Saturday, 17 December 2016, the Half Moon Hotel held a ceremony to commemorate the album and the beginning of Island Records. The event was organised by the hotel's chairman, Guy Steuart III, and was attended by Blackwell, drummer Clarence "Tootsie" Bean, and Hayward's children Stuart and Silvia. The special guests autographed a print of the album cover, which is now on display at the hotel. In 2019, the Half Moon renamed its bar and grill "Hayward's" as a tribute to the pianist.

== Track listing ==
Side one
No.	Title	Writer(s)	Length
1.	"Ochos Rios"
2.	"Begin the Beguine"	Cole Porter
3.	"Virgin Isle Vamp"	Eddie Heywood
4.	"Granada"	Agustín Lara
5.	"Ethiopia"

Side two
No.	Title	Writer(s)	Length
6.	"On the Street Where You Live"	Frederick Loewe, Alan Jay Lerner
7.	"All the Things You Are"	Jerome Kern, Oscar Hammerstein II
8.	"Session at the Opera"
9.	"Free Lance"	Lancelot Hayward

== Personnel ==
- Lance Hayward – piano, vocals (1)
- Frank Rabain – guitar (1–5)
- Ernest Ranglin – guitar (6–9)
- Maxwell Smith – bass
- Clarence "Tootsie" Bean – drums
