= Music of Bermuda =

The music of Bermuda is often treated as part of the Caribbean music area. Its musical output includes pop singer Heather Nova, and her brother Mishka. Collie Buddz has also gained international success with reggae hits in the US and the UK.

The island's musical traditions also include steelpan, calypso, choral music, as well as an array of bagpipe music played by descendants of Irish and Scottish settlers; the biggest bagpipe band on modern Bermuda is the Bermuda Islands Pipe Band. Bermuda is also the home of one of the most popular Caribbean music groups in the United States, the Bermuda Strollers.

The islands are also home to gombey dancers, reggae, gospel music, drum majorette bands, jazz and other styles.

== Folk music ==
Bermuda is home to several folk traditions, including pipe bands, the gombey dance and a ballad song.

=== Gombey ===
The Gombey dance is an iconic symbol of Bermudan culture. It mixes elements of British, West African and indigenous New World cultures. Traditionally in Gombey, dancers are black and male (though in modern times, female groups have emerged) and their father has to have been a Gombey dancer. They perform in groups of 10-30 in wild masquerade costumes with brilliant colors and odd angles, meant to evoke the plumage of tropical birds; they are sometimes based on Bible verses. Gombey dances are taught orally, through family members. The dances are energetic, and grow swifter gradually, while the spectators become more wild and energetic. The gombey tradition is at its liveliest during the Christmas season, and is also performed during Boxing Day, Easter, New Year's Day, football and cricket matches and other festivals and celebrations.

The word "Gombey" is related to the Bahamian "Goombay", a similar dance tradition. It also refers to a specific drum of African origin (see List of Caribbean drums). In addition to the Bahamian Goombay tradition, Gombey is similar to some other Afro-Caribbean styles and celebrations (such as the Mummers). Afro-Caribbeans brought to Bermuda as slaves or convicts during colonial times introduced other Caribbean traditions.

=== Ballad ===
Bermuda's ballad tradition has declined in the 20th and 21st century, though it remains popular among a devoted subculture on the island. The Bermudan ballad is characterized by "wry, self-deprecating humor", often improvised, and concerned with the rapid change of Bermudan culture.

The most famous Bermudan balladeer is Hubert Smith, a popular local composer who performed for many visiting royalty and foreign heads of state. He is also the composer of "Bermuda Is Another World", an unofficial anthem for the island.

=== Bagpipe music ===
Bermuda has a strong Scottish and Irish cultural presence, and is home to well-known bagpipe bands that draw on those traditions, especially the Bermuda Islands Pipe Band. The bagpipe tradition was brought to Bermuda by Scottish and Irish soldiers from the 18th to the 20th centuries.

There were, until relatively recently, two major bagpipe bands in Bermuda, the Bermuda Cadets Pipe Band and the Bermuda Police Pipe Band. Both bands formed in 1955 and disbanded in 1992, the same year the Bermuda Islands Pipe Band was formed. Other historically important bagpipe bands include the Salvation Army Young People's Band, which dates back to the 1930s.

== Choirs ==
Religious choir singing is also popular on Bermuda. Well-known choirs include the Roman Catholic Diocesan Choir, the Mt. Zion Male Voice Choir, as well as the non-church choirs Philharmonic Choir and Post Office Choir.

== Calypso ==
Calypso first became a part of Bermuda music in the 1940s and 50s. It was imported from Trinidad and Tobago. The Talbot Brothers were the island's first major calypsonians; they organized as a group in 1942, and began touring the United States by the early 1950s.

Norman Luboff followed in the footsteps of Jamaican-American calypso singer Harry Belafonte in popularizing Trinidadian calypso. Luboff de-emphasized the saucy, ribald side of calypso and created a popular form that appealed to the masses. His signature song is "Yellow Bird" which became very popular in the 1960s. Genuine Bermudian calypso can only be found on the fine Bermuda Gombey & Calypso 1953-1960. A detailed history of Bermuda calypso and gombey written by Bruno Blum can be read in the CD booklet (available online in both French and English). Artists include Sidney Bean, The Talbot Brothers, Reuben McCoy, Hubert Smith, The Four Deuces, Al Harris, Erskine Zuill and jazzman Lance Hayward, the first musician ever produced by Chris Blackwell, founder of Island Records.

== Rock ==
Being close to the United States, rock'n'roll is also popular. Bermuda's most famous rock group was The Savages, a garage band that are considered important in the genre, especially by collectors, and foreshadowed 1970s punk. Their biggest single was The World Ain't Round, It's Square.

== Steelpan ==
Steelpan music was invented in the late 1930s in Trinidad, and was brought to Bermuda by a number of groups, including the Esso Steel Band, who moved to Bermuda in the 1950s. Esso became known for arranging Western classical music for the steelpan. In the 1960s, local choral traditions were merged with calypso and steelpan to create a distinctively Bermudian style.

Paul A.W. Smith and De Onion Patch Crew are a new steelpan group who perform newer hits like soca and R&B music on steelpan.

== Music institutions ==
Bermuda is home to the Bermuda Ballet Association, which was founded by Patricia Gray in 1962, with support from Ana Roje. Other music institutions include the Bermuda National Youth Jazz Ensemble and the Bermuda Philharmonic Orchestra. There is also a Bermuda Folk Club. There is a Portuguese Cultural Association which promotes the culture of the large Portuguese population on Bermuda, especially tradition folk dances of the Azores. The Bermuda Philharmonic conductor is Gary Burgess, a former opera singer. Bermuda has also produced notable classical musicians in Marcelle Clamens, an opera singer, mezzo-soprano Jane Farge, pianists Peter Carpenter and Karol Sue Reddington, and Joyce Mary Helen DeShield.
