= Leland College =

- U.S. National Register of Historic Places
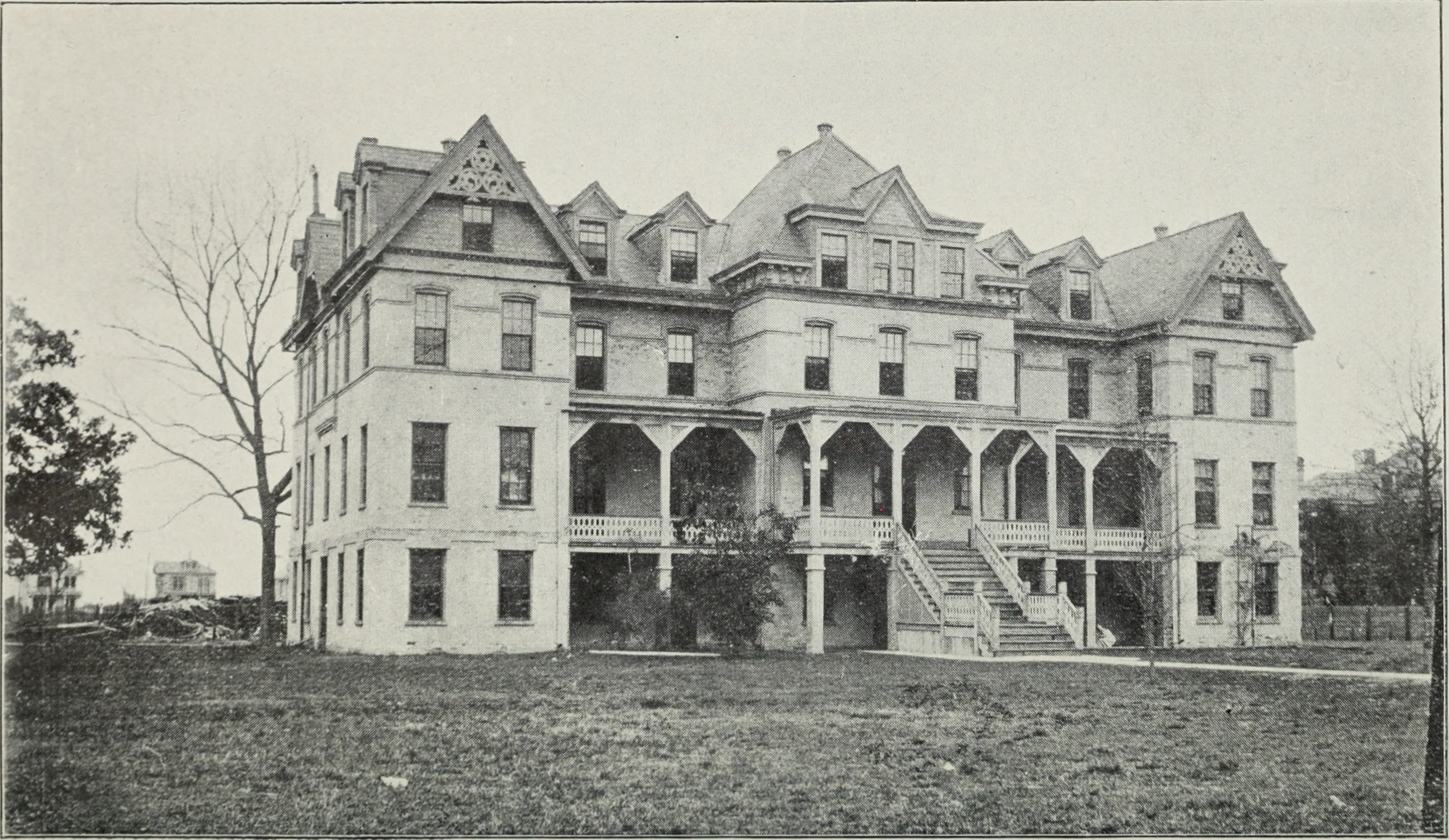
- Chamberlain Hall

- Location within Louisiana Location within the United States
- Location: Off Groom Road, about 0.83 miles (1.34 km) west of Baker, U.S.
- Nearest city: Baker, Louisiana, U.S.
- Coordinates: 30°35′34″N 91°10′53″W
- Area: 20.9 acres (8.5 ha)
- Built: 1923
- NRHP reference No.: 82000433
- Added to NRHP: November 10, 1982

Leland College was founded in 1870 as a Christian college for blacks in New Orleans. It was open to students "irrespective of race, color or previous condition of servitude." It was formerly known as Leland University. It was relocated to Baker, Louisiana after a storm in 1915. It closed in 1960.

== History ==
Leland University was founded in 1870. Holbrook Chamberlain, a philanthropist from Brooklyn, established the school. He bought the original campus’ land on St. Charles Avenue and built its buildings including University Hall. John Elijah Ford served as the school’s president.

In 1873, the institution was relocated from temporary quarters to a new campus with buildings, which included the monumental Second Empire “University Hall” facing St. Charles Avenue. This campus was located across from Audubon Park and within block, of where Loyola University and Tulane University would build new campuses in the subsequent 25 years.

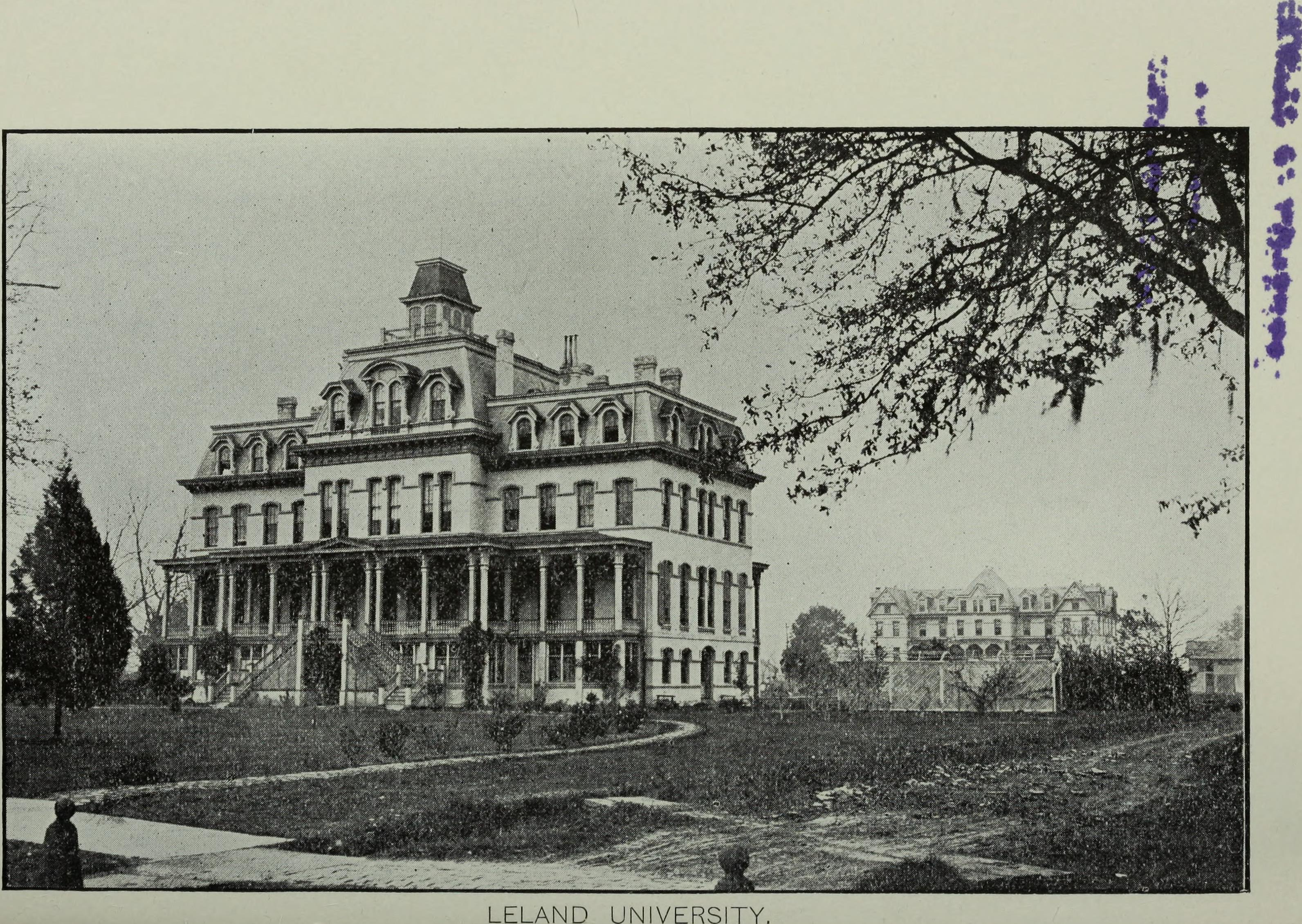
View of the original campus from St. Charles Avenue (University Hall is in the foreground)

After University Hall was heavily damaged in the Hurricane of 1915, Leland University decided not to repair the campus. Instead, the board sold the valuable real estate, which had appreciated significantly since the University’s founding, and relocated to land purchased near Baker, Louisiana, where Leland College reopened in 1923.

Leland University was founded with the purpose of promoting Christian education in Louisiana and adjacent states. Never accredited, the school closed in 1960 because of financial difficulties.

The 20.9 acres (8.5 ha) area of the Baker campus, comprising four contributing properties and one non-contributing building, was listed on the National Register of Historic Places on November 10, 1982.

The college facilities had become derelict by the time of listing. In the early 21st century, only the ruins of the two dormitories can be seen faintly through trees. The frame classroom, the president's house, and the concrete classroom all disappeared at some time.

== Operation ==
When Dr. Travers of Saratoga was faculty president in 1882 it had 100 students and was co-educational. An hour a day of industrial work was required.

Alumni from Tulane University, which was next door, repainted in the middle of the night poles adorned with Leland's school colors "coal black" and included a skull and crossbones. Coal tar was used. Tulane president Albert Sidney Johnston, who had been a Confederare general, required an apology but the sophomore class at Tulane took suspension as a punishment instead.

Julia Ward Howe delivered the commencement speech in 1885. In 1901 Rev. Dr. R. W. Perkins became president. By 1904 Leland had 1,000 students.

After the storm of 1915, its New York based trustees decided to sell. Plans to relocate to Alexandria and the purchase of 212 acres there were abandoned over racial opposition and the school was moved to 160 acres in Baker.

== Alumni ==
- Abraham Lincoln Davis (class of 1949) minister and civil rights activist
- William Hicks (pastor) (class of 1893, BA, BD) Baptist pastor, academic administrator, writer
- Eddie Robinson, class of 1941, former Grambling State University head football coach
- Christina Jenkins, cosmetologist and creator of the hair weave
- Linda Thomas Greenfield

== See also ==
- National Register of Historic Places listings in East Baton Rouge Parish, Louisiana
