= Mt. Zion Male Voice Choir =

Choir in Bermuda

The Mt. Zion Male Voice Choir is a men's choir in Bermuda.

The choir consists of 30 men who are members of the Mt. Zion African Methodist Episcopal Church. Most members are over age 50.The choir is directed by musician Terry Henry.

The choir provide free concerts in Bermuda throughout July each year. The choir has also traveled to the United States to put on concerts. In June 2012 the choir was featured in concert at Bermuda's GospelFest.

== Discography ==
- Live at the Rubber Tree (2009) Independent
- Live at King Square (2010) Independent

== Videography ==
- Beyond The 4 Walls (2013) DVD

== See also ==
- Music of Bermuda – Choirs
