= Xochi Birch =

American programmer and entrepreneur

Xochi Birch OBE
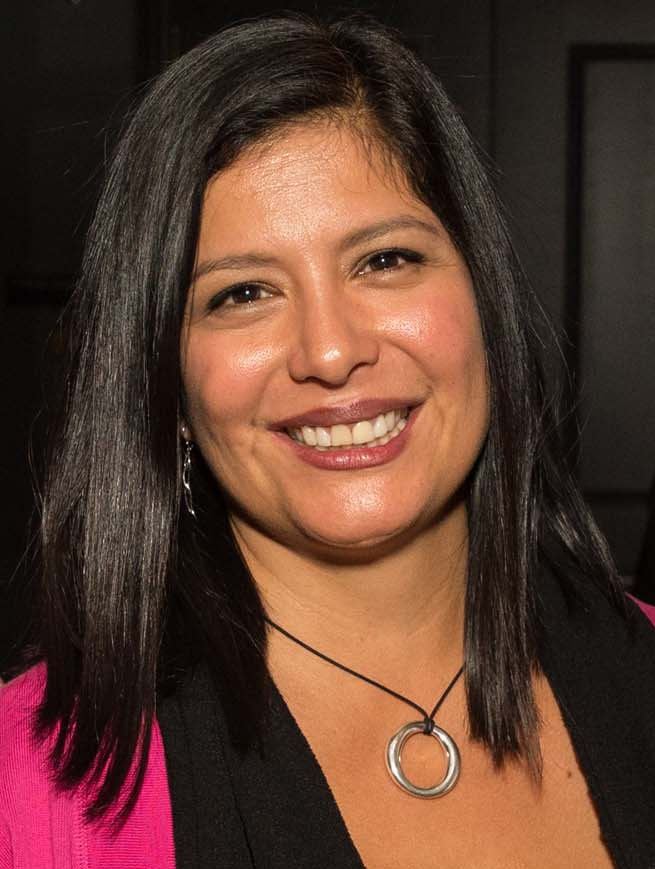
- Birch in 2013
- Occupation(s): Entrepreneur, Computer programmer
- Spouse: Michael Birch
- Children: 3

Xochi Birch OBE (/ˈsoʊtʃi/) is an American computer programmer and entrepreneur in San Francisco, California. She is the co-founder of several companies since 1999, most notably the online social networking website Bebo, with her husband Michael Birch. She and Michael also founded several domains, with support from Paul Birch and Morgan Sowden.

== Life and career ==
Xochi and Michael Birch launched Bebo in 2005. By 2007 the site had over 45 million registered users and was the sixth most popular site in the UK, bigger than AOL, Amazon.co.uk and bbc.co.uk. They sold Bebo to AOL in March 2008 for $850 million. Their combined 70% stake yielded a profit of $595 million from the deal. The Bebo franchise quickly declined under its new owners and fell into bankruptcy; in 2013 the couple bought Bebo back for $1 million.

Following their sale of Bebo, the two started five separate companies they run in parallel. Their current project is The Battery, an exclusive members club in San Francisco, with their vision stated as “to create a culture where inspiration is embraced, diverse communities come together and egos are checked at the door.”

Birch is a supporter of the non-profit organization charity:water, having given over $4 million to the organization. For her 40th birthday she asked people to donate to charity:water instead of giving her a gift; the campaign raised more than $20,000.

Xochi has repeatedly spoken at the Dublin Web Summit, alongside other industry veterans such as Kevin Rose, Kevin Lynch and Robert Scoble.

== Personal life ==
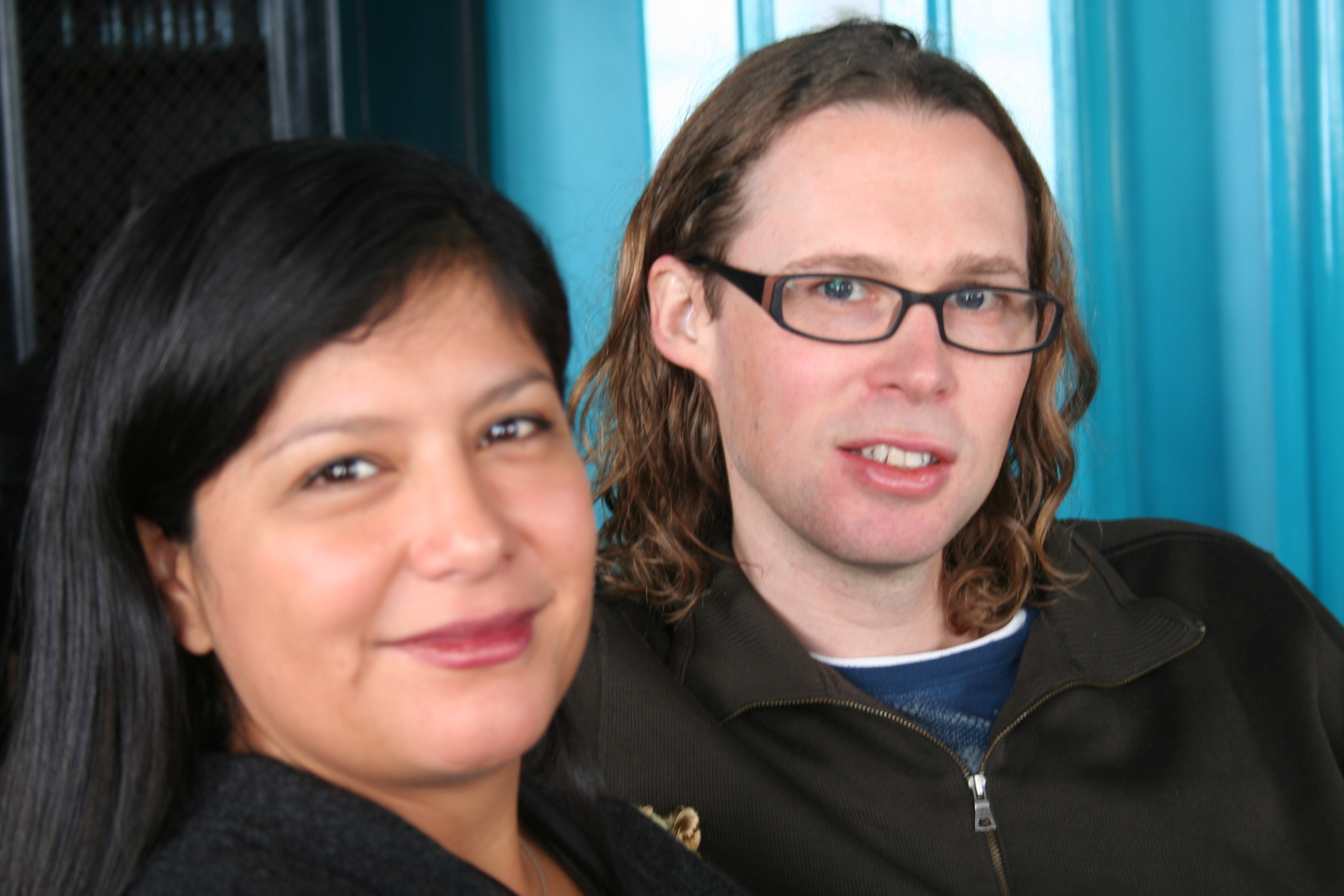
Xochi with her husband Michael at their home in Pacific Heights, San Francisco (2010)

Birch was raised in California to a father of Mexican heritage. She met British-born Michael in a pub in London while she was studying abroad. In 1994, after they were married, she moved to London and worked as a computer programmer, quitting in 1999 so they could start their own business. For several years she and Michael lived from paycheck to paycheck while they started companies and waited for one to become successful. She and Michael moved back to the Bay Area in 2002. In 2014 she and Michael bought a run-down pub and manor house in the small village of Woolfardisworthy, Torridge in North Devon.

== Awards ==
In the 2015 Queen's Birthday Honours, Birch was appointed an Officer of the Order of the British Empire (OBE) "for services to technology and online services". On 11 February 2016 she received her OBE at Buckingham Palace.
