= Lance Hayward at the Half Moon Hotel, Volume 2 =

1960 album by Lance Hayward

Studio album by Lance Hayward
- Released: 1960
- Studio: Radio Jamaica and Rediffusion Studios, Kingston
- Label: Island Records; CB22
- Producer: Chris Blackwell

Lance Hayward at the Half Moon Hotel, Volume 2 (Note: Nowhere on the album does the full title actually appear. The back cover and label say "Lance Hayward at Half Moon," however, the first volume has the same marking on the back cover although this was not its title. The full title of this album is inferred.) is a 1960 studio album by Bermudian jazz pianist Lance Hayward. It is the follow-up to his 1959 debut Lance Hayward at the Half Moon Hotel and is the second-ever album released on Chris Blackwell's Island Records. Whereas the first album had called the pianist "Lance Haywood" incorrectly, on this album he is identified properly.

== History ==
Lance Hayward had performed in Jamaica during the winters of 1957-58 and 1958–59, and during the 1959–60 season was hired to lead the house band at the Half Moon Hotel in Montego Bay. It was likely in late 1959 that Chris Blackwell made his first recording of the group. The second volume of Hayward's recordings for Blackwell was released in 1960. The lineup is the same except for guitarist Norman Astwood, who replaced Frank Rabain. It is unclear when this recording took place. According to the album's liner notes, the selections are "the most requested numbers in the Hayward repertoire, during their winter engagement at Half Moon," which suggests the recording was done in the spring of 1960. "Old Devil Moon" features Jamaican singer Totlyn Jackson, who joined the group for its summer 1960 residency at the New Windsor Hotel in Hamilton, Bermuda.

The cover photograph of the band at Sunset Beach, Montego Bay was taken by Horst Ebensberg. The cover design was by Blackwell's cousin Barbara DeLisser, the daughter of the Half Moon Hotel's owner, Harold DeLisser.

== Track listing ==
Side one
No.	Title	Writer(s)	Length
1.	"Julie"	Baba Motta
2.	"This Could Be the Start of Something"	Steve Allen
3.	"You Mean Everything to Me"	Neil Sedaka
4.	"Old Devil Moon"	Burton Lane, Yip Harburg

Side two
No.	Title	Writer(s)	Length
5.	"Love Me Tender"	George R. Poulton, Ken Darby
6.	"Taking a Chance on Love"	Vernon Duke, John La Touche, Ted Fetter
7.	"Montego Bay"	Lancelot Hayward
8.	"Dancing on the Ceiling"	Richard Rodgers, Lorenz Hart

== Personnel ==
- Lance Hayward – piano
- Norman Astwood – guitar
- Maxwell Smith – bass
- Clarence "Tootsie" Bean – drums
- Totlyn Jackson – vocals (4)
