= Angela Barry =

Bermudian writer and educator

- Born: Bermuda
- Education: The Berkeley Institute; University of York; Sorbonne University
- Occupations: Writer; educator
- Notable work: Gorée: Point of Departure (2010)
- Children: 2 sons
- Parent(s): Madree and Edward Richards
- Awards: Brian Burland Prize for Fiction

Angela Barry (née Richards) is a Bermudian writer and educator. She spent more than 20 years living abroad – in England, France, The Gambia, Senegal and Seychelles – before returning to Bermuda, where she has primarily worked as a lecturer since the 1990s. Her creative writing reflects her connections with the African diaspora, and as a PhD student at Lancaster University she worked on cross-cultural projects. She was married to Senegalese Abdoulaye Barry and they have two sons, Ibou and Douds, although eventually divorcing.

== Background and education ==
Born in Bermuda, she is the youngest of the three children of Madree and Edward Richards (who was the second premier of Bermuda and the first Black Bermudian to head the country's government). Barry's elder sister is London-based circuit judge Patricia Dangor, and their brother is Bermuda parliamentarian Bob Richards.

After receiving her early education in Bermuda at Central School and at The Berkeley Institute, Barry went to England in the 1960s at the age of 15 to study for her A-levels, living with her sister while attending Holland Park School in London. She went on to the University of York, obtaining a BA (Hons) degree in English & Comparative Literature, then the Sorbonne in Paris where she studied French for two years. After earning a master's degree in Language Arts & Education from the University of Sussex, she worked as an English teacher in the UK. After her first marriage she lived in The Gambia, Senegal and the Seychelles. She returned to Bermuda in 1989. In 1993, she won a James Michener Creative Writing Fellowship to attend the Caribbean Summer Writers Institute at the University of Miami.

For many years a lecturer at Bermuda College, she introduced there a groundbreaking course in Bermudian Literature, "starting with early perceptions of the Island in the 17th century and Shakespeare’s The Tempest, to Mary Prince in the 19th century". She is co-chair of the Burland Collection Committee, concerned with the literary legacy of Brian Burland, described by Barry as "the greatest writer never to be known or acknowledged in the country of his birth". Barry has also taught at Bermuda High School.

She was involved with the Lancaster/Uganda Friends Writing Project, a collaboration between the Centre for Transcultural Writing and Research at Lancaster University (where she would obtain her PhD), and Femrite Women Writers Association in Kampala, Uganda, that took place between October 2010 and March 2011.

== Writing ==
Barry's early creative writing was in the form of short stories she produced as part of the Bermuda Writers' Collective. Her work appeared in Palmetto Wine, published in 1990 by the collective, and in the 1993 anthology An Isle So Long Unknown: Short Stories.

With the 2002 UK publication of her book Endangered Species and Other Stories (the title inspired by the Dianne Reeves song "I Am An Endangered Species"), Barry became the first Bermudian adult fiction writer to have work released by an international publishing house since Brian Burland in the 1960s. George Lamming in his endorsement of the collection states that it "displays an astonishing virtuosity in bringing together the multiple narratives that define the Atlantic adventure." Barry herself has said: "There's a preoccupation in these stories with how we deal with difference of all kinds -- racial difference, class difference, differences of gender, and how we look at the whole notion of diaspora. These are things that have been a part of my life. Africa has been a major theme in my life, and how those of us of African descent locate ourselves. I needed very much to write those African stories, and I also needed to write Bermudian stories. Bermuda is much more complex than people give it credit for. It's an extremely challenging place to live, particularly for people who don't march to the drum of conformity." In 2008 the Brian Burland Prize for Fiction was jointly awarded to Barry for Endangered Species and to Rawle Frederick for A Ballad of Orange Valley.

Her first novel Gorée: Point of Departure, published by Peepal Tree Press in 2010, looks at family and identity through the Atlantic holocaust. In the words of Geoffrey Philp, "Goree is more than a memorial—although that in itself would be an accomplishment. It is a story of bridging distances, both physical and psychic, between Africa and the Caribbean, London and St. Lucia, damnation and redemption in the lives families torn apart by an estranging ocean." It was nominated for the 2012 International Dublin Literary Award and in 2013 won the Brian Burland Prize for Fiction.

In October 2017 Barry received a Lifetime Achievement Award from the Bermuda Arts Council, presented to persons who are considered pioneers in their respective art form and who have "created significant bodies of original work that is representative of the Bermudian spirit".

Barry's work has also been published in various journals, including the Bermudian Magazine, Massachusetts Review, The Caribbean Writer, BIM: Arts for the 21st Century, and Anales Caribe. She is a contributor to the 2018 Commonwealth Writers anthology, So Many Islands: Stories from the Caribbean, Mediterranean, Indian Ocean and Pacific (edited by Nailah Folami Imoja and Nicholas Laughlin), and also to the 2019 anthology New Daughters of Africa, edited by Margaret Busby.

In 2022, Barry published her second novel, The Drowned Forest. Describing it as "a powerful exploration of Bermuda's colonial legacy, deftly unpacking strata of class, race, privilege and education as they encircle the lives of characters living on the island", the reviewer for The Big Issue concluded: "Barry signals the perils of ignoring our history – and the climate crisis. She reminds us that our past is rooted in our present."

== Bibliography ==
=== Books ===
- Endangered Species and Other Stories. Leeds: Peepal Tree Press, 2002, ISBN 978-1900715713.
- Gorée: Point of Departure. Leeds: Peepal Tree Press, 2010, ISBN 978-1845231255.
- The Drowned Forest. Leeds: Peepal Tree Press, 2022. ISBN 9781845235376.

=== Selected shorter writings ===
- "Black Mythologies: The Representation of Black People on British Television" – lead essay in The Black and White Media Book, BBC Publications, Trentham Books, 1988.
- "Song for Man" in Palmetto Wine, Bermuda Writers’ Collective, 1990.
- "Where the Remote Bermudas Ride" in An Isle So Long Unknown, Bermuda Writers’ Collective, 1993.
- "Where the Remote Bermudas Ride" in The Massachusetts Review, 1994.
- "Pie Jinks2" in The Bermudian magazine, 2002.
- "Adonde va la lejana Bermudas" in Anales del Caribe, Casa de las Americas, Havana, 2006.
- "Gorée Revisited" and extract of "Interior Monologue" in The Caribbean Writer, 2005.
- "Extract from Gorée: Point of Departure", in BIM: Arts for the 21st Century, 2008.
- "Interior Monologue" in Humanism and Anthropology, 2010.
- "Without Prejudice" in New Daughters of Africa, (ed. Margaret Busby), 2019.

== Awards and recognition ==
- 1993: James Michener Creative Writing Fellowship.
- 2012: International Dublin Literary Award nomination for Gorée: Point of Departure
- 2013: Brian Burland Prize for Fiction (Bermuda Literary Award, given by the government to honour literary achievement by Bermuda's writers).
- 2013: shortlisted for the inaugural Hollick Arvon Caribbean Writers Prize.
- 2017: Lifetime Achievement Award from the Bermuda Arts Council.
