= Lance Hayward =

Bermudian musician (1916–1991)

- Born: 17 June 1916; Bermuda, British Empire
- Died: 9 November 1991 (aged 75) Manhattan, New York, U.S.
- Genre: Jazz
- Instrument: Piano

Lancelot Henry Stuart Hayward (17 June 1916 – 9 November 1991) was a jazz pianist who was born in Bermuda, where he lived until he settled in New York City at the age of 50. Blind since infancy, he received formal training in classical piano and was a self-taught jazz musician, eventually becoming one of Bermuda's best-known jazz artists. He was often the accompanist of choice for Carmen McRae, Marvin Gaye and others when they performed on the island.

== Biography ==
Lancelot Henry Stuart Hayward was born in Bermuda to Henry Hayward and Olivia Lathan Hayward. Diagnosed as having juvenile glaucoma, he was almost totally blind by the time he was about 14 months old and beginning to walk. At the age of 13, he went to Perkins School for the Blind in Massachusetts, United States, where he learned to read books and music written in Braille, but he returned to Bermuda three years later, when he was 16. Within a year of returning he had his first job as a musician and continued over the years to try to make a living through music in Bermuda. He also found seasonal work in Jamaica at Montego Bay and Ocho Rios.

Hayward was married in 1940 to Mary Jackson, and they had a son Stuart (born in 1942) and a daughter, Sylvia (born 1951).

As his career developed as a jazz pianist, as well as an arranger, Hayward became the most sought-after pianist on the island, called to play for visiting singers including Carmen McRae, Joe Williams, Sarah Vaughan, Arthur Prysock and Marvin Gaye. Hayward also formed an all-male chorus, the Mu-En Chorale.

According to his son, Hayward viewed his life in Bermuda as "one big struggle against the prejudices of the sighted and of whites, and against the generally cavalier attitude of the Bermuda government and the hotels toward local musicians." In 1966, Hayward moved permanently to New York City. There, the many jazz clubs at which he appeared included West Boondock, Jacques-in-the-Village and the Village Corner, where he appeared regularly for 16 years. He formed his own chorus, the Lance Hayward Singers, performing a wide variety of music, from Bach to Duke Ellington. The Lance Hayward Singers continue to sing Hayward's arrangements under the direction of Claudia Marx.

In 1991, at the age of 75, Lance Hayward died of pneumonia at Mount Sinai Hospital, in Manhattan, New York, where he lived.

== Honours and recognition ==
Apart from many accolades received from the US, Canada, Europe and Japan, Hayward was given the following honours in Bermuda:

- 1979 - award from the Bermuda for Bermudians organisation and the Ministry of Community and Cultural Affairs
- 1980 - awarded the Queen's Certificate and Badge of Honour
- 1984 - award from National Heritage Music Committee for outstanding contribution to music in Bermuda
- 1985 - becomes the first Bermudian to perform as a featured artist at the Bermuda Festival
- 1988 - Bermuda Arts Council Lifetime Achievement Award
- 2001 - posthumous award from Adlev Entertainment Productions presented at their first Entertainment Awards Show

== Discography ==
- Bermuda Evening (The Hayward and Hayward Vocal Ensemble; 1950)
- Lance Hayward at the Half Moon Hotel (1959)
- Lance Hayward at the Half Moon Hotel, Volume 2 (1960)
- A Closer Walk (1984)
- Hayward and Hinton (1987)
- Killing Me Softly (1992)
