= Warwick Academy =

Location
- 117 Middle Road Warwick; PG01; Bermuda
- 32.2765°N 64.7940°W

Information
- Funding type: Private
- Motto: Quo Non Ascendam ("To what heights may I not ascend?")
- Established: 1662
- Principal: David Horan
- Grades: Reception Year - Year 13 (Ages 4 to 18)
- Enrollment: 860 Students
- Mascot: Bear
- Newspaper: The Bear
- Website: warwick.bm

Warwick Academy is the oldest school in Bermuda, established in 1662. It is located in Warwick Parish.

It was named after the English colonial administrator Robert Rich, 2nd Earl of Warwick, who gave the original land. Its first Schoolmaster was Richard Norwood, the mathematician who had carried out the first and second surveys of Bermuda in 1616 and 1627, respectively.

== The School ==
Warwick Academy was formerly a government-aided (a privately owned school, with its own Board of Governors, operating as part of the public school system in exchange for government funding) Secondary School but since 1992 it has been a selective independent co-educational day Primary and Secondary School for students aged 4 to 19. It has a reputation for high academic standards and positive discipline. It is divided into a Primary School and a Secondary School. The school's motto is "Quo Non Ascendam". The current principal is Mr. David Horan. Head of the Secondary School is Mrs Rebeka Matthews-Souza and the Head of the Primary School is Mrs. Maria Woods.

=== The 3 Pillars - Academics, Pastoral Care, and Co-Curriculars ===
Warwick Academy is an International Baccalaureate (IB) World School and an accredited Council of International Schools (CIS) member school catering to students from Reception Year through to Year 13. The school offers an International Early Years Programme (IEYC), the International Primary Curriculum (IPC) and UK National Curriculum from Years 1 to 9, the IGCSE in Year 10 & 11, and the IB Diploma Programme (IBDP), IB Career-related Programme (IBCP - using BTEC subjects), IB Individual Subjects, and a Dual Enrolment programme with the Bermuda College in Year 12 & 13.

Pastroal Care covers how the school manages relationships and expectations and it forms the spine of the school.

In addition, the school has vibrant Music, Drama, Sport, and Community Service programmes and offers a variety of additional co-curriculars.

== Notable alumni ==
B. Dylan Hollis - Social media personality and baker

Dame Flora Duffy - Triathlete and Olympic Gold Medalist

Delray Rawlins - Cricketer
