= Masterworks Museum of Bermuda Art =

Art museum in Bermuda

Coordinates: 32°17′37″N 64°45′42″W

The Masterworks Museum of Bermuda Art (MMOBA) is a nonprofit museum and cultural centre in Bermuda (a North American British Overseas Territory), dedicated to the preservation, exhibition, and study of art connected to the island. Beyond its exhibitions, the museum functions as a hub for education, community events, and cultural exchange.

== History and operations ==
MMOBA was founded in 1987 by Tom Butterfield, MBE (born 1948), and has been based in the Bermuda Botanical Gardens in Paget Parish since 2008. Its building, a former arrowroot factory dating to the mid-1800s, was renovated between 2004 and 2008 into a 16,000-square-foot museum. A surviving section of the original structure now houses Tuck Shop II, a shop selling handmade and small-batch artisan goods, open from 10am to 4pm, Monday through Saturday. The museum is also home to the Botanist Café, an indoor-outdoor café in the botanical gardens serving locally sourced food and drink from 8am to 6pm daily.

=== Collection ===
The Masterworks Permanent Collection holds more than 1,600 works spanning the 1700s to the present, including paintings, drawings, photographs, sculpture, and historic documents and ephemera. Artists represented include Winslow Homer, Georgia O'Keeffe, Marsden Hartley, Frank Stella, and Janet Fish, alongside numerous Bermudian and contemporary artists.

Combining internationally known figures with artists closely tied to Bermuda, the collection traces artistic responses to Bermuda's landscape, architecture, and society, and reflects how depictions of Bermuda have changed over time.

=== Exhibitions ===
Masterworks mounts a rotating programme of exhibitions drawn largely from its Permanent Collection, shown in the main Butterfield Gallery, while the Rick Faries Gallery is reserved for contemporary work and emerging artists. Exhibitions range from historic paintings and works on paper to contemporary art, with particular attention to artists inspired by Bermuda or whose work illuminates its cultural landscape. The Rick Faries Gallery in particular positions Masterworks as an active participant in Bermuda's contemporary art scene, rather than solely a custodian of historical material.

=== Public programmes ===
Masterworks runs a year-round schedule of public events and educational programmes, including exhibition openings, artist talks, lectures, and guided tours of the exhibitions on view and the Permanent Collection, offering visitors additional historical and artistic context alongside the exhibitions themselves.

=== Arts education ===
The museum's education programme includes year-round offerings in ceramics and printmaking, artist-led workshops, and skill-shares, immersive studies, and all-ages workshops on the second Saturday of every month. Programming for teens and younger audiences includes camps and afterschool activities, extending the museum's reach across age groups and experience levels.

=== Visitor information ===
General admission is $10. Children under 12 are admitted free, and seniors, aged 65 and over, receive free admission on Mondays. Admission is free for all visitors on the second Saturday of each month.

=== On-site facilities ===
The museum houses the Botanist Café and Tuck Shop II (see above).

== See also ==
- Culture of Bermuda
- List of art museums
