= Hair prosthesis =

A hair prosthesis (or cranial prosthesis) is a custom-made wig specifically designed for patients who have lost their hair as a result of medical conditions or treatments, such as alopecia areata, alopecia totalis, trichotillomania, chemotherapy, or any other clinical disease or treatment resulting in hair loss. The terminology is used when applying for medical insurance or tax deduction status.

Doctors have been prescribing these prostheses since the 1950s. Cranial prostheses also help to protect disease-weakened immune systems from the sun, and to regulate body temperature.

Cranial hair prostheses have advanced due to technology. A cranial hair prosthesis is different from a regular wig. Cranial hair prosthesis is done in several steps that include the taking of the cranial perimeter mold to achieve a perfect fit. The mold is done at the base where the hair is attached. The base is made using a hypoallergenic fabric because people having chemotherapy are usually very sensitive to any material, and their scalp is prone to allergies. The same is done when applying the hair to the base. The technique used to attach the hair is focused on avoiding that the knotting touches the scalp.
