= Paget Parish =

Parish of Bermuda

Coordinates: 32°17′11″N 64°46′12″W

Paget Parish is one of the nine parishes of Bermuda. It is named for William Paget, 4th Baron Paget de Beaudesert (1572–1629).

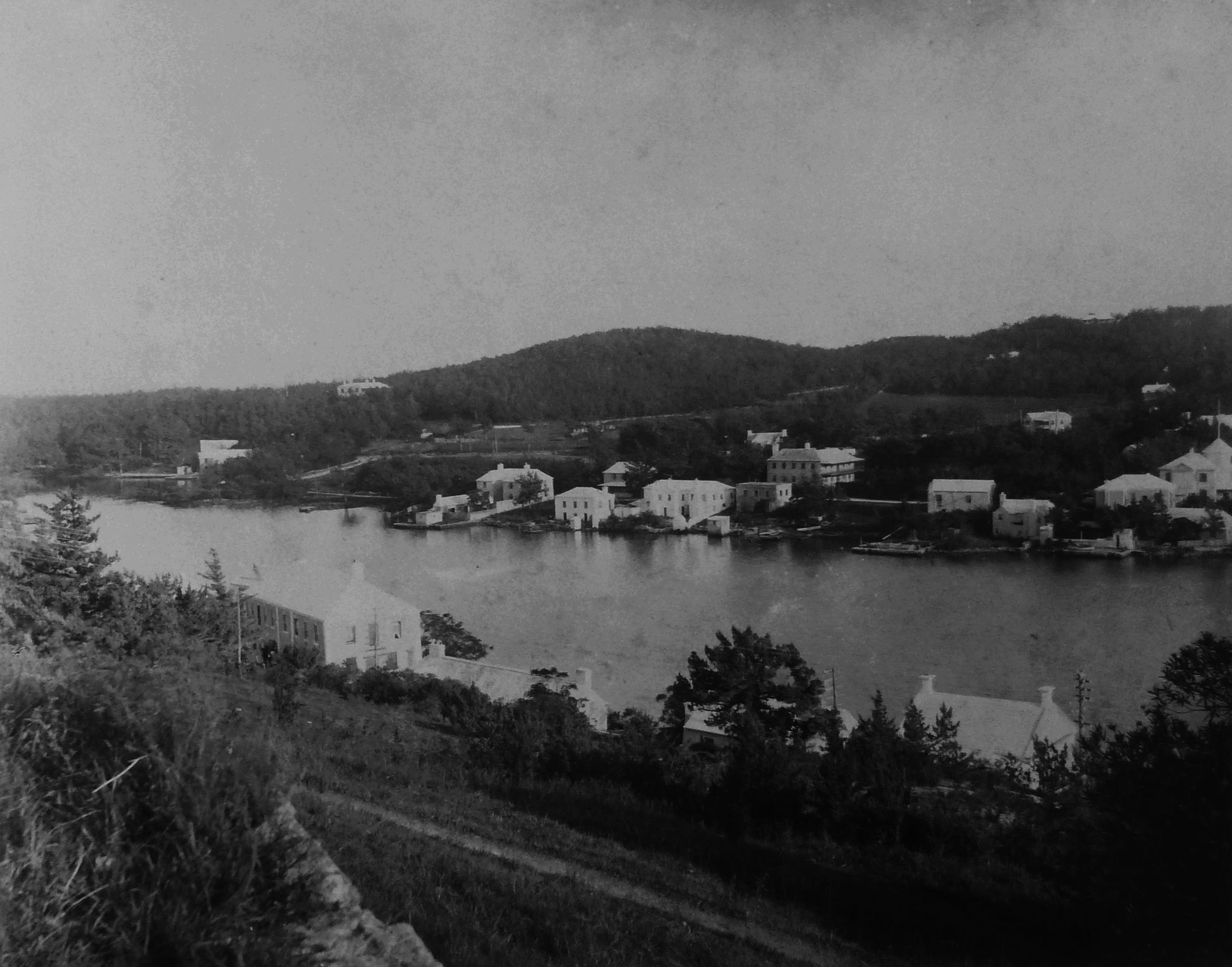
1904 view across Hamilton Harbour from Fort Hamilton of cedar-cloaked hills in Paget Parish

The parish is located in the central south of the island chain, immediately south of Hamilton Harbor on the main island. It is joined to Warwick Parish in the southwest, and Devonshire Parish in the northeast. As with most of Bermuda's parishes, it covers just over 2.3 square miles (about 6.0 km^{2} or 1500 acres). It had a population of 5,899 in 2016.

Other notable features of Paget include Bermuda College, the Bermuda Division of the British Red Cross, Bermuda Botanical Gardens and Masterworks Museum of Bermuda Art.

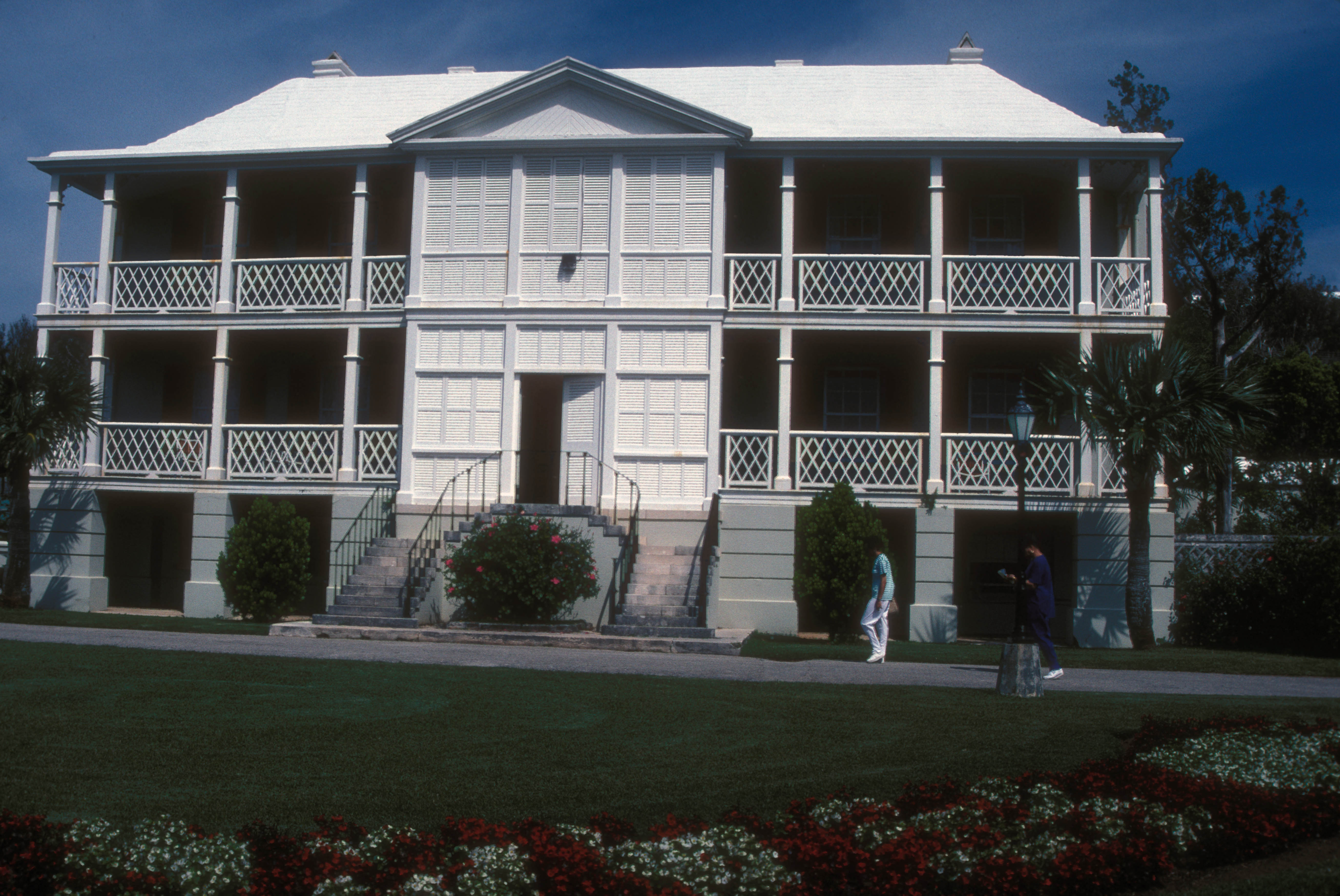
Camden, official residence of the Premier of Bermuda, is in the parish

== Education ==
Public primary schools:

- St. Paul's Preschool
- Gilbert Institute
  - As of 2016 it has 130 students and has Bermuda's sole primary deaf and hearing impaired student programme. In 2016 the Bermudian government proposed closing the school. Members of the PTA suggested the school could reduce costs by using parents to carry out maintenance. Grant Gibbons, the former Bermudian Minister for Education, expressed support to keep Gilbert open.
- Paget Primary School

Natural features in Paget include Hamilton Harbor, Coral Beach, Elbow Beach, and Grape Bay, as well as Salt Kettle, a peninsula which protects the approach to Hamilton Harbour, and Hinson's Island, which though geographically closer to Warwick Parish, is part of Paget. The island's only hospital, King Edward VII Memorial, is in Paget.

== Notable people ==
- Flora Duffy (born in 1987 in Paget, Bermuda) is a triathlete, olympic medalist
- Brian Duperreault (born in 1947 in Paget, Bermuda) is CEO of AIG
- William Gilbert Gosling (1863 in Paget Parish – 1930 in Bermuda) was a Canadian politician, businessman and author. From 1916 to 1920, he served as the mayor of St. John's, Newfoundland and Labrador.
- Jade Hannah (born in 2002 in Paget, Bermuda) is a Canadian swimmer
- B. Dylan Hollis (born in 1995 in Paget Parish, Bermuda) is a Tiktok star and cookbook author
- Dorothy Matthews-Paynter (1922-2024) was a hairstylist and trichologist
- Khano Smith (Born in 1982 in Paget, Bermuda) is a former Football player and current Head coach of Rhode Island FC.
- Shiona Turini is a Bermudan stylist and costume designer who has won an Emmy Award.
