= Badge of Honour =

- Ribbon of the badge
- Type: Civil decoration
- Awarded for: Meritorious services to the community of an exceptional or outstanding nature
- Presented by: British Overseas Territories & formerly by colonies of the British Empire

Order of Wear
- Next (higher): Queen's Medal for Chiefs
- Next (lower): Campaign medals

The Badge of Honour, accompanied by the King's Certificate and Badge of Honour, is a civil award previously presented by the governments of British colonies and protectorates, and now by British Overseas Territories, to recognise loyal and valuable service by native chiefs and other non-European dignitaries. The Badge of Honour and Certificate continue to be awarded for meritorious services to the local community of an exceptional or outstanding nature in Gibraltar, the Falkland Islands, the Cayman Islands, Bermuda and St Helena.

The decoration has occasionally been awarded to Europeans. For example, the New Hebrides version of the Badge of Honour was awarded to the Duke of Gloucester and two British Army officers, including then-Colonel Charles Guthrie, for their role in the so-called 'Coconut War' of 1980.

== Different versions ==
There are two distinct types of badge, one for African territories established in 1922, and a non-African version, awarded since 1926.

The African version was an oval bronze badge similar in appearance to the Queen's Medal for Chiefs, with non-African countries bestowing a circular silver-gilt badge. Otherwise, both types follow the same design, with the reigning Sovereign's crowned effigy on the obverse, and the name of the territory and a distinct emblem symbolic of that country on the reverse. Both have a raised ornamental rim of laurel leaves.

Both versions came in two sizes, a larger badge worn around the neck and a smaller badge, introduced in 1954, for recipients who opted to wear the decoration on the left breast with other medals. Both use the same watered bright yellow ribbon, with some South East Asian territories adopting a red, white and blue ribbon.

== Notable Recipients ==
- Dorothy Matthews-Paynter
