= B. Dylan Hollis =

Bermudian social media personality and baker

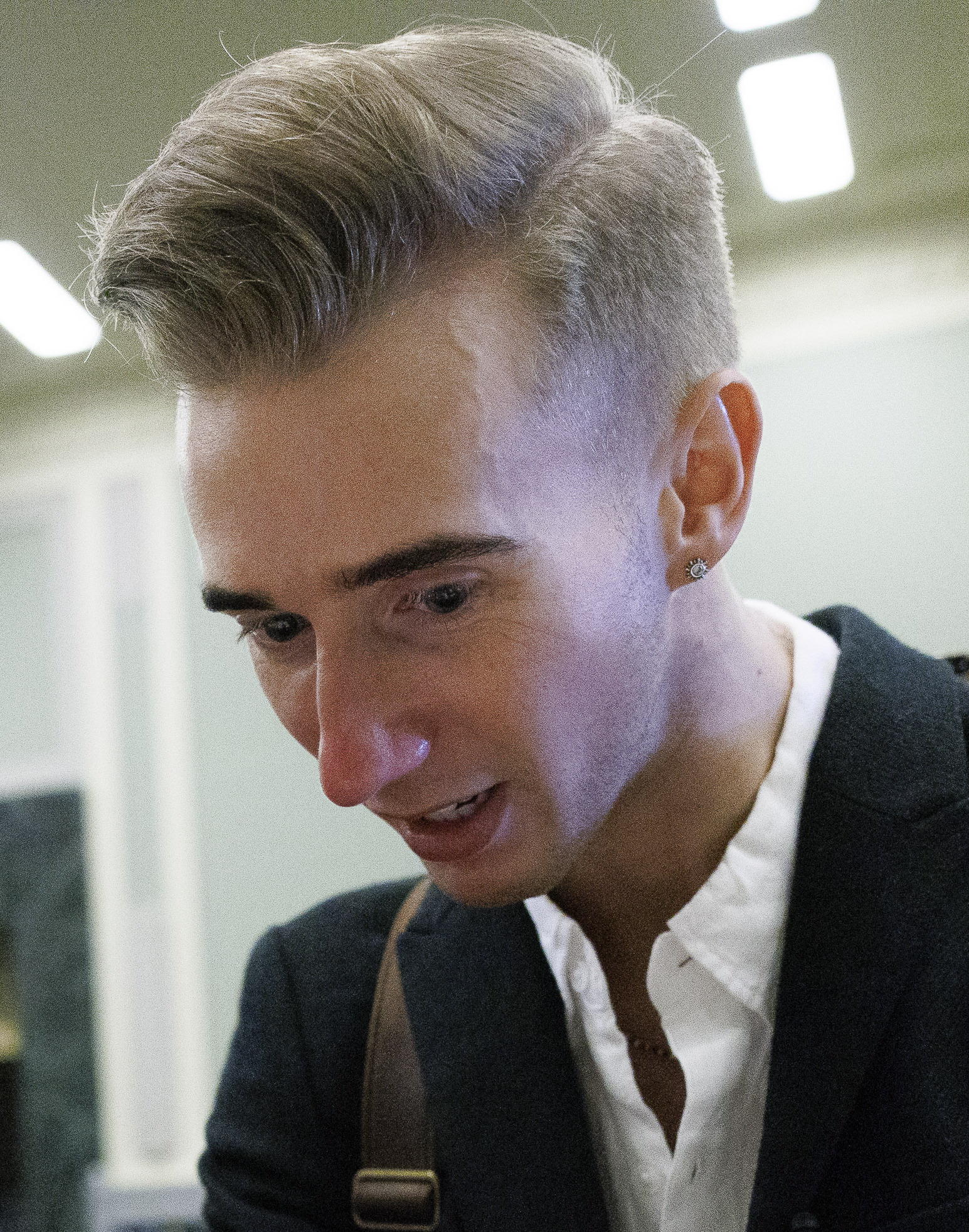
- Hollis in 2023
- Born: Benjamin Dylan Hollis; September 7, 1995 (age 30); Paget Parish, Bermuda
- Occupations: Social media personality, baker, social media comedian
- Years active: 2020–present
- Known for: TikTok videos about unconventional vintage American recipes with an off-kilter humour.

TikTok information
- Page: bdylanhollis
- Followers: 10.2 million

YouTube information
- Channel: B. Dylan Hollis
- Subscribers: 2.66 million
- Views: 835 million
- Last updated: August 13th, 2026

Benjamin Dylan Hollis (born September 7, 1995) is a Bermudian social media personality and baker. Hollis creates TikTok and YouTube videos of himself making, sampling, and commenting on unusual vintage American recipes. He had over ten million followers on TikTok as of October 2024, as well as over two million subscribers on YouTube. Hollis has appeared on Good Morning America and The Kelly Clarkson Show.

His first cookbook, Baking Yesteryear, from Penguin Random House, became one of the most pre-ordered books in the history of its publisher, surpassed only by A Promised Land, Becoming, and Spare. Released in July 2023, it debuted at number one on The New York Times Best Sellers list and remained on the list for an additional fourteen weeks.

== Early life ==
Hollis grew up in St. George's, Bermuda, and attended Warwick Academy. In 2014, he moved to Laramie, Wyoming, to attend the University of Wyoming, where his longstanding fascination with mid–20th-century American culture led him to study 1940s big band jazz, as well as purchase and daily-drive a 1963 Cadillac Series 62, which he named "Ernest". He graduated with a Bachelor of Arts in Music in 2021.

== Career ==
Hollis began using TikTok in April 2020 to pass time during the COVID-19 pandemic. He initially made short humorous TikTok videos about jazz and his life in Wyoming.

Having little baking experience before the pandemic, Hollis was inspired after finding in his vintage collection a 1915 recipe for a "pork cake", a fruitcake with ground pork in it, which he found "ridiculous" and decided to film himself preparing. The video, in which Hollis describes the dish as tasting like "a good question mark", was viewed over a million times as of June 2022. Another video on Depression-era peanut butter bread received almost 34 million views. By April 2021, Hollis had over two million followers on the app, over 37 million likes, and he was ranked seventh worldwide for influencer growth on TikTok. As of June 2025, he had about 10 million TikTok followers and over 2 million YouTube subscribers. Hollis also has a substantial following on Tumblr, entering the site's top 20 list of web celebrities in April 2022. His videos are often downloaded from TikTok and re-uploaded to Tumblr. He also had 396,000 Instagram followers as of May 2022.

Hollis's videos use recipes from 20th-century vintage cookbooks, typically spanning from the late 1800s to the 1960s. The recipes in his videos span from 1865 at the oldest to 2001 at the newest, however the recipes he touches on are typically from the Great Depression. Recipes highlighted in his videos have included cassava pie, peanut butter bread, tuna salad Jell-O, a mock apple pie, a SpaghettiOs Jell-O ring, chocolate potato cake, a water pie, a jellied meatloaf, "magic mayo", and potato doughnuts. Videos typically cover the preparation, cooking, and tasting of each recipe within one minute. Hollis chooses recipes based on whether they meet his "three Ws" criteria: "wild, wacky, and wonderful". He has also said he is cautious of trying certain recipes to avoid cultural appropriation. Hollis's videos sometimes also include discussions of his upbringing in Bermuda and clips of him performing jazz piano.

Hollis has been noted for his animated personality and slapstick humor in videos; Eater described his persona as "alternating between droll quips and cartoonish overacting" and "[feeling] like a Marx Brothers film on 2x speed", while The Food Channel wrote that he "combines the zinging one-liners of Rodney Dangerfield with the oddball charisma of Ed Grimley (Martin Short circa 1984) or Pee-Wee Herman (Paul Reubens circa 1983)". Hollis cites radio programming of the 1930s and 1940s as influencing his on-camera persona.

Hollis appeared on The Kelly Clarkson Show in October 2022, where he baked pork cake alongside host Kelly Clarkson and guests Jay Leno and Ayo Edebiri. In a May 2021 column for The New York Times, comedian John Hodgman mentioned watching Hollis's videos, particularly noting his tuna Jell-O salad and chocolate mayonnaise cake videos.

In June 2022, Hollis announced he would be writing a cookbook, Baking Yesteryear. The book's 101 recipes, spanning from the 1900s to the 1980s, include some of the highest-rated recipes from his videos, including but not limited to cornflake macaroons, Australian and New Zealand Army Corps (ANZAC) biscuits, Ricciarelli, and the homebake version of Buster Bars popularised in the 1980's by the release of the Dairy Queen ice-cream bar of the same name. The book was released on July 25, 2023 via Penguin Random House.

In 2025, Hollis released a second cookbook, Baking Across America: A Vintage Recipe Road Trip, featuring 100 dessert recipes from throughout the United States.

== Personal life ==
He has a collection of over 340 vintage cookbooks, to which fans often contribute. Hollis is gay and came out in 2019. He often makes comedic references to his sexuality in his videos. He told PinkNews that he had difficulty expressing his sexuality growing up, due to hostile attitudes in Bermuda, and that his TikToks are "my way of sharing myself to what I assume are accepting people, and it's proven to be that way – and it's made me feel a whole lot better about myself."

== Bibliography ==
- Baking Yesteryear: The Best Recipes from the 1900s to the 1980s (2023, Penguin Random House)
- Baking Across America: A Vintage Recipe Road Trip (2025, Penguin Random House)
