= Bermuda College =

Community college in Paget Parish, Bermuda

- Type: Public community college
- Established: 1974
- President: Dr. David Sam
- Academic staff: 52
- Students: 675
- Location: Paget Parish, Bermuda; 32°16′40″N 64°46′30″W
- Campus: Suburban, 26 acres (0.11 km^{2})
- Website: www.college.bm

Bermuda College is a public community college in Paget Parish, Bermuda.

The only post-secondary educational institution in Bermuda, Bermuda College offers a variety of academic, technical and professional courses in the Divisions of Applied Science & Technology, Business Administration & Hospitality, Liberal Arts, and the Centre for Professional and Career Education. Programs lead to associate's degrees, certificate or diplomas and professional designation and non-credit offerings for lifelong learners.

== History ==
The College was created by the Parliament of Bermuda through the passage of the Bermuda College Act in 1974. It amalgamated of three existing institutions: the Bermuda Technical Institute established in 1956, the Bermuda Hotel and Catering College (1965), and the Academic Sixth Form Centre (1967).

== Academics ==
From 2016 to 2022, Bermuda College had an average of 663 students each year with an average class size of 15 students. There are 37 full-time faculty and additional adjunct lecturers.

Dr. David Sam is Bermuda College's current president.

== Facilities ==
The Bermuda College Library maintains more than 35,000 volumes and 1,315 reels of microfilm. In addition, a special collection of Bermudiana consisting of 1,104 volumes and 348 rare books which contain material that is now out of print. The library also provides access to online resources and other informational databases.

Bermuda College has six student computer labs. The college has a Windows NT network that provides access to a wide range of programming languages, software packages, and applications, including the Internet.

== Partnerships ==
Bermuda College has transfer partnerships with ten universities in New Brunswick, Nova Scotia, and Ontario in Canada as well as two universities in the United Kingdom, and St. George's University in Grenada.

Bermuda College has a 2+2 partnership for a nursing degree with Kentucky State University as well as at least 25 other transfer partnerships with colleges in the United States.

== See also ==
- Citizens Uprooting Racism in Bermuda (1998)
