= Girlguiding Bermuda =

- Headquarters: Lady Asser Guide Hut
- Location: 19A Richmond Road; Pembroke HM 08
- Country: Bermuda
- Founded: 1913
- Membership: 392
- Chief Guide: Liz Burnley
- Website www.girlguiding.bm

Girlguiding Bermuda (formerly Bermuda Girl Guide Association) is a Guiding organisation in Bermuda. It is one of the nine branch associations of Girlguiding UK. It is represented by Girlguiding UK at World Association of Girl Guides and Girl Scouts (WAGGGS) level and Girlguiding UK's Chief Guide is also Chief Guide for Girlguiding Bermuda. Girlguiding Bermuda is part of the Caribbean Link for Guiding.

== History ==
In 1913, Mary Swan, a US Girl Scout visiting her grandparents, introduced Girl Scouting to Bermuda and formed a Girl Scout troop with fifty members. When she left Bermuda, the troop was closed. Shortly after this, a local headmistress started Girl Guiding and the first Guide unit was registered in January 1919. Brownies followed in 1921.

In 1927, the Bermudians obtained a local headquarters called the "Lady Asser Guide Hut", which was sponsored by Lady Asser, the wife of the Governor of Bermuda. Robert Baden-Powell, the founder of Scouting and Guiding, and Olave Baden-Powell, the World Chief Guide, visited Bermuda in 1930. Olave visited Bermuda again in 1951 and 1954.

In 1969, Bermuda issued a set of four postage stamps celebrating Girl Guiding in Bermuda. The 25c stamp shows young people kayaking and the 30c stamp depicts a young person abseiling. In 1993, the instrumental role of Girlguiding Bermuda and the Bermuda Scout Association in developing many of the islands prominent leaders was recognized by the Bank of Bermuda Centennial Trust.

== Programme ==
The programme is a modified form of Guiding in the United Kingdom, adapted to suit local conditions. The promise is the same. Rainbow, Brownie and Guide groups exist on the islands and Young Leaders are also active. In 2005, there were no registered Rangers.

The Guide emblem features the Coccoloba uvifera or sea grape.

== See also ==
- Bermuda Scout Association
