= Michael Birch (businessman) =

British businessman

Michael Birch OBE
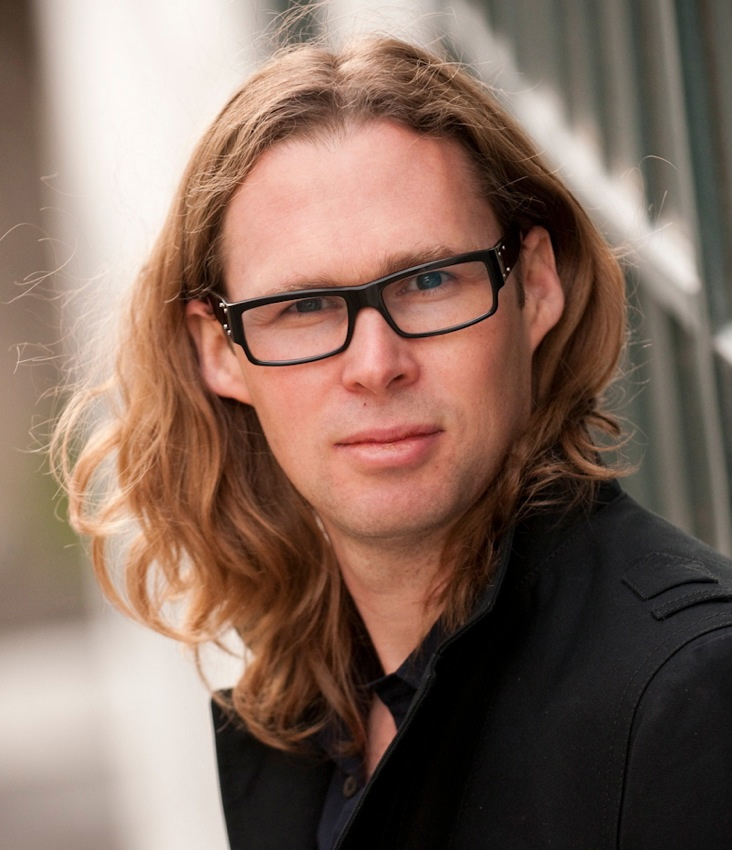
- Birch in 2012
- Born: 7 July 1970 (age 55); Sawston, Cambridgeshire, England
- Occupation(s): Computer programmer, entrepreneur, businessman
- Spouse: Xochi Birch
- Children: 3

Michael Birch OBE (born 7 July 1970) is a British computer programmer and entrepreneur. Birch has helped co-found several startups including Blab, BirthdayAlarm.com, Ringo.com, and social networking site Bebo. Birch sold Bebo, his most lucrative business, which he started with his wife, Xochi Birch, was sold to AOL in March 2008 for $850 million. Later he purchased the company back for $1 million. Birch has made several large donations to charitable organizations, including charity:water.

== Early life ==
Birch was born in Sawston, Cambridgeshire and raised in Hertfordshire. His grandmother was born and lived in Woolfardisworthy, Torridge, North Devon, and he spent many childhood summers in the village.

He attended Imperial College London from 1988 to 1991, where he received a bachelor of science degree in physics.

== Career ==
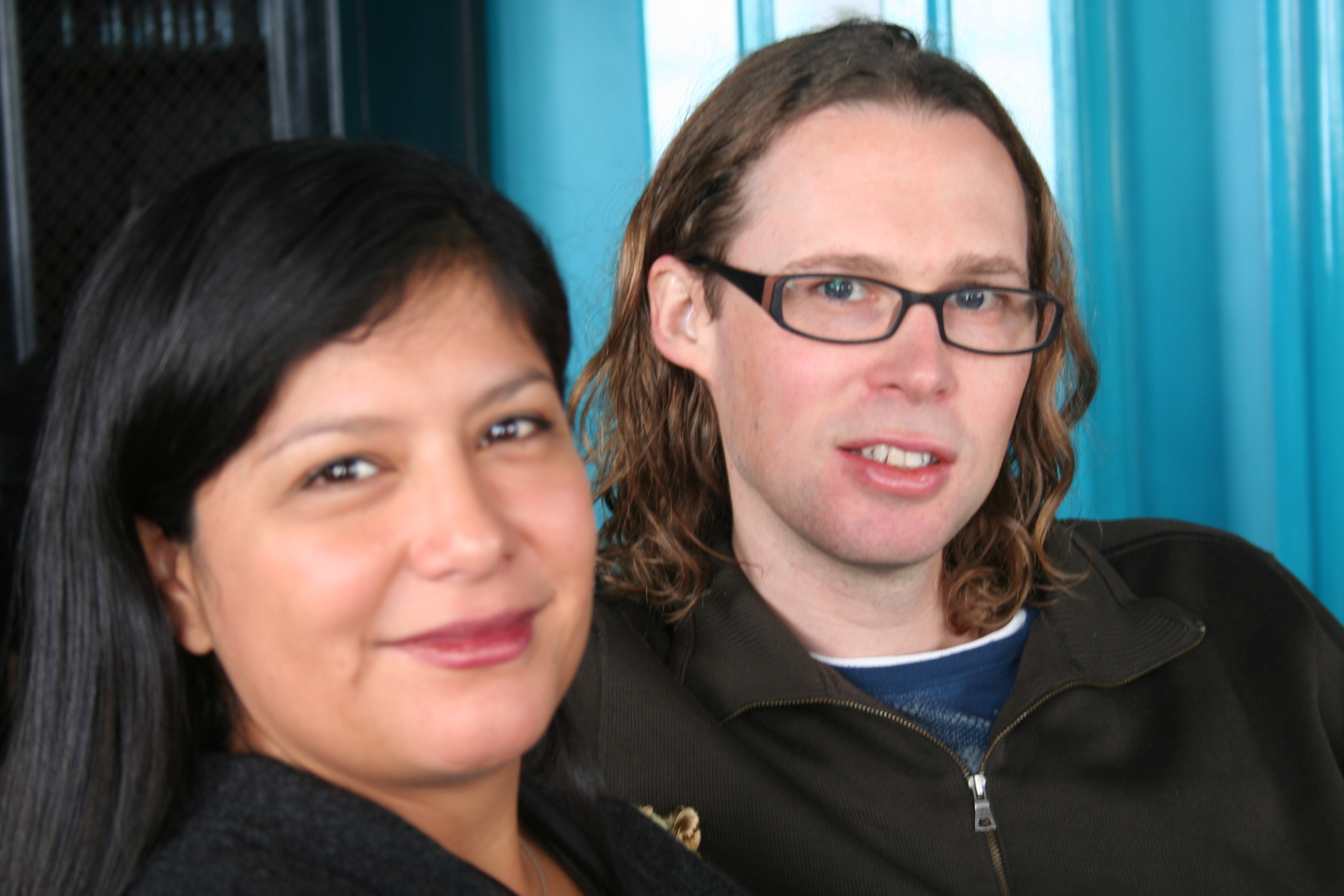
Birch with his wife Xochi at their home in Pacific Heights, San Francisco in 2010

Birch and his wife Xochi Birch have co-founded over half a dozen startups in the past 15 years. Together with Birch's brother Paul, they founded BirthdayAlarm.com and with Morgan Sowden they founded Ringo.com (which was sold to tickle.com in 2003). Birch and Xochi later founded the online social networking website Bebo in January 2005. In 2007, Bebo had over 45 million registered users and was the sixth most popular site in the UK, bigger than AOL, Amazon.co.uk and bbc.co.uk.

Michael and Xochi Birch sold Bebo to AOL in March 2008 for $850 million. Their combined 70% stake yielded a profit of $595 million from the deal. The Bebo franchise quickly declined under its new owners and fell into bankruptcy; in 2013 the couple bought Bebo back for $1 million.

Since 2008, the couple has started five separate companies they run in parallel. and also invested in MyStore.com along with Gordon Crawford, Julian Lennon and Todd Meagher. In 2013 the Birches founded an exclusive but not elite members club called The Battery, in San Francisco, with their vision stated as "to create a culture where inspiration is embraced, diverse communities come together and egos are checked at the door."

In July 2009, Michael co-founded PROfounders Capital with Brent Hoberman, Peter Dubens, Jonnie Goodwin, Rogan Angelini-Hurll and Sean Seton-Rogers.

Birch and Xochi are supporters of the non-profit organization charity:water, having given over $20 million to the organization. Birch also helped the organization launch mycharitywater.org, a fundraising platform that has raised more than $21 million for clean water projects around the world since launch in autumn 2009. In October 2011, Birch launched a social media project with charity:water and the startup studio Monkey Inferno, Inc to raise awareness of the water crisis and give millions of people the ability to let their friends know, donate and help solve the water crisis.

In October 2014 the Birches, through a hospitality group named The Collective, bought the Farmers Arms public house and Manor House properties in the village of Woolfardisworthy (Woolsery). A popular community pub for decades, the historic Grade II Listed Farmers Arms, the only pub in Woolfardisworthy village, closed in December 2012 and was reopened in September 2018. The Grade II Listed Manor House has been closed for several years, is to be restored and put into use as a hotel.

== Awards ==
In the 2015 Queen's Birthday Honours, Birch was appointed an Officer of the Order of the British Empire (OBE) "for services to technology and online services." On 11 February 2016 he received his OBE at Buckingham Palace.
