= Bebo =

American social networking website

Bebo, Inc.
- Company type: Private
- Website type: Social networking service
- Available in: Multilingual
- Founded: January 2005; 21 years ago
- Dissolved: May 2022
- Headquarters: Los Angeles, California, U.S.
- Area served: Worldwide
- Founders: Michael Birch; Xochi Birch
- Products: Social media; software vision mixer; streaming media
- Parent: The Monkey Inferno
- Website: bebo.com
- Launched: January 2005

Bebo (/ˈbiːboʊ/ BEE-boh) was an American social networking website that originally operated from 2005 until its bankruptcy in 2013. The site relaunched several times after its bankruptcy with a number of short-lived offerings, including instant messaging and video streaming, until its acquisition by Amazon in July 2019 when it was shut down. It was announced in January 2021 that it would be returning as a new social-media site the month after. By May 2022, it had once again been shut down, without having left beta-testing.

The site was founded by Michael Birch and Xochi Birch.

== History ==
=== Founding and early years ===
Bebo was founded by husband-and-wife team Michael and Xochi Birch in January 2005 at their home in San Francisco. The website name was bought by the founders, and the backronym "Blog Early; Blog Often" was invented to answer the question of what the name meant.

The website, at the height of its popularity, overtook Myspace to become the most widely used social-networking website in the United Kingdom, eventually registering at least 10.7 million unique users.

=== Sale to AOL ===
Bebo's popularity saw it sold to AOL in March 2008 for $850 million, with the Birches' combined 70% stake yielding a profit of $595 million from the deal. The BBC later described the AOL purchase of Bebo as "one of the worst deals ever made in the dotcom era", and it cost the then-CEO of AOL, Randy Falco, his job.

In 2010, on April 7, AOL announced that it would either sell the website or shut it down; this was mainly due to the falling numbers of unique users moving to rival site Facebook. AOL said that Bebo could not compete with other social-networking sites in its current state and that the company could not commit to taking on the massive task to keep Bebo in the social-network race. It was reported that AOL's finances were struggling.

The National Space Agency of Ukraine's RT-70 radio telescope sent 501 messages chosen by Bebo users, called A Message From Earth, toward the planet Gliese 581c. Sent on 9 October 2008, it will arrive in the spring of 2028.

=== Criterion Capital Partners ownership transfer ===
On June 16, 2010, AOL sold Bebo to hedge-fund operators Criterion Capital Partners.

On February 17, 2011, Bebo launched a brand-new design. This consisted of a new, more-modern header and homepage, as well as a new profile-layout option. Users could also see who had visited their profiles (a feature which could be changed in settings). In April 2011, Bebo added a new notification system, similar to Facebook's – a feature which had been much-requested in feedback. It notified users of new inbox-messages, lifestream activity, and more.

On January 30, 2012, access to Bebo became unavailable for 36 hours, resuming normal service during the early hours of February 1, 2012. A Bebo spokesperson told TechCrunch that the site was down due to "a technical clusterfuck". Adam Levin, CEO of Bebo and Criterion Capital Partners, stated that they were trying to release some new features which caused the site to crash. No data was lost as a result of the outage. The crash triggered a belief that Bebo was gone for good, so that the hashtag #bebomemories trended worldwide on Twitter.

=== 2013: Bankruptcy and sale ===
In May 2013, the company voluntarily filed for Chapter 11 bankruptcy protection; however, the receiver Burke Capital Corporation has clarified that Bebo remains "healthy" and "operating" and that the company was using its Chapter 11 filing on May 9 in Los Angeles to "restructure some operational inefficiencies and other arrangements that are burdensome." Many analysts have questioned the value-proposition that Bebo could offer users and do not fault CCP.

On July 1, 2013, Michael and Xochi Birch, the original founders, purchased the social network back from Criterion Capital Partners (CCP) for $1 million.

On August 6, 2013, messages were posted on Bebo.com informing users that the site would be down for maintenance from August 7, 2013. On August 7, 2013, a video featuring Michael announcing his plan for the new Bebo was placed on the front page of the site. The video informed users that the site would be taken down while the Bebo team developed the new product. Many believed that this would be normal maintenance; however, it was revealed that the site would be closed for a few months. The announcement also stated that all user-content had been deleted, but users' blog posts and images would be retrievable in downloadable format should members opt-in to receive this. However, members who submitted emails still have not retrieved profile data (pictures, blogs, etc.).

=== 2014–16: Return of Bebo and introduction of Bebo Blab ===
In April 2014, Bebo founder Michael Birch took to Bebo in a tongue-in-cheek video to promote the re-launch of Bebo with the slogan, "Probably Not for Boring People". The relaunch video emphasized Bebo's history in which it included its then-most popular feature: the whiteboard.

Bebo relaunched on January 7, 2015; announced with the news that Bebo was now a messenger app called Bebo Blab which was available on Google Play and Apple App Store. The app amassed 3.9 million users in just one year. Bebo Blab shut down two years after its relaunch, as users weren't returning to the platform to watch archived streams on replay. Birch wrote:

Blab was great in many ways, but it wasn't going to be an everyday thing for millions. So we're kicking down the sandcastle, and rebuilding it as an 'always on' place to hang with friends.

— Michael Birch, CEO of Bebo

=== 2017–2018: Bebo streaming software ===
As of April 19, 2018, the site offered multi-feature Twitch streaming software (similar to Open Broadcaster Software or XSplit). This closed down in October 2018 to focus on tournament software.

=== 2019: Sale to Amazon ===
In July 2019, Amazon, through their subsidiary Twitch Interactive, acquired Bebo for US$25 million after outbidding Discord.

=== 2021–2022: Relaunch ===
In early 2021, the Bebo.com webpage began to display a series of messages suggesting a new relaunch of Bebo was imminent. In an interview on February 3, founder Michael Birch described his plan to relaunch the social networking website with a focus on individual profiles, rather than the news feed that had become ubiquitous throughout the rest of social media.

=== 2022: Second shutdown ===
As of May 2022, Bebo has been shut down again, never having left its private beta-testing phase, with the website now displaying a quote by founder Michael Birch, about the attempts of resurrecting Bebo. Birch states "Who knows", in response to if Bebo would ever be relaunched again.

=== 2026: Second relaunch ===
In April 2026, the Bebo Facebook page announced another new release ‘in the next few days’.

== Original website features ==
Users received a personal profile page where they would post blogs, photographs, music, videos, and questionnaires, which other users may answer. Additionally, users could add others as friends and send them messages, and update their personal profiles to notify friends about themselves.

Each Bebo user received a profile, which included two specific modules: a comment section where other users could leave a message and a list of the user's friends. Users could select from many more modules to add. By default, when an account was created, the profile was private, which limited access to friends. The user could select the "Public Profile" option so the profile would be visible to any other members. Profiles could be personalized by a design template that became the background of the user's profile, known as a skin. Profiles also included multiple-choice quizzes; polls for their friends to vote in and comment on; photo albums allowing users 96 images per album; blogs with a comments section; a list of bands of which the user was a fan; and a list of groups that the user was a member of. A "Video Box" could also be added, either hot-linked from YouTube or copied from a Bebo media content provider's page.

Other features included:

- Lifestream – these changes included uploaded photos, updated flashboxes, and newly added videos and friends. A friend's updates to Facebook, Twitter, Flickr, and other services could also be viewed, if those friends had linked those accounts to their Bebo profile.
- Bebo Mobile – Bebo launched the mobile version of the site in early 2006, allowing users access to Bebo from a mobile device. In 2007 and 2010, the mobile site had been updated to match the design and features of the full site.
- Bebo Authors – on February 22, 2007, Bebo Authors, also known as Bebo Books, was launched. On this section of the site, authors uploaded chapters of their books and could also get them reviewed with a certain module.
- Bebo Groups – on July 10, 2007, the "Group" module was added to pages. This enabled people to view groups which were previously joined to a school and were also viewable only to school members. Bebo also gave an option to convert existing Authors or Bands to Groups.
- Bebo Chat – a service called Bebo Chat was launched with several other updates in 2011, which allowed users to chat to other users through a Meebo chat plugin with Bebo branding. Users could also update their 'Saying' and show their availability status, as well as access other links to Bebo's pages and special offers. It also provided a link for users to visit Bebo's fan page on Facebook, where they could 'Like' their page and receive updates.

=== Bebo system ===
Bebo runs on servers running the Resin Server and uses the Oracle Database system. It is estimated that Bebo had somewhere between 5000 and 8000 Phantom4 servers provided by Rackable Systems and has over 100 TB of disk space across all of their servers.

=== Open Media Platform ===
Announced on the November 13, 2007, Bebo's Open Media Platform is a platform for companies to distribute content to the Bebo community. Content providers can bring their media player to Bebo, and monetize the advertising within it. Each content provider has a specialised page designed for video which showcases any Adobe Flash video content at the top of the profile. Many networks are signed up for the service, including CBS, Sky, Ustream.tv, BBC and Last.fm.

=== Open application platform ===
Bebo joined OpenSocial, a set of common APIs for building social applications across the web. It announced plans for a developers platform and said it will make a further platform announcement. Bebo's Open Application Platform was launched in early December 2007 with just over fifty applications and is now host to hundreds.

=== Privacy and security ===
==== Inadvertent privacy breach by New Zealand ISP ====
On May 21, 2008, some users in New Zealand were temporarily given full access to other users' accounts. Bebo network engineers traced the error to a misconfigured proxy server in an Internet service provider (ISP) in New Zealand, which was later corrected. The ISP seemed to be interfering with its cache, thereby causing some of its customers to receive cached cookies and details from other users, likely because the ISP used dynamic IP addresses.
