= Bermuda Scout Association =

Branch of The Scout Association of the United Kingdom in Bermuda

Scout Association of Bermuda
- Location: P.O. Box DV 193, Devonshire DVBX
- Country: Bermuda
- Founded: 1912
- Founder: The Scout Association of the United Kingdom
- Membership: 98
- Chief Scout: H E Mr. Andrew Murdoch Governor of Bermuda
- Chief Commissioner: Geoffrey Rothwell
- Website www.scouts.bm

The Scout Association of Bermuda is a branch of The Scout Association of the United Kingdom as Bermuda is a British Overseas Territory. The Bermudian Scout Oath and Law, as well as other Scouting requirements, closely follow that of the United Kingdom. Program activities are taken from the British system but adapted to the local conditions. Leader training including for the Wood Badge is conducted with the help of British and other nearby Scout organizations. Bermuda Scouts participate in camps and events and a contingent has been fielded to World Scout Jamborees. The Bermuda Scout emblem incorporates elements of the coat of arms of Bermuda. The Scout Association of Bermuda is governed by a Chief Scout and a Chief Commissioner appointed by The Scout Association and an executive committee. In June 2021, Rena Lalgie, Governor of Bermuda was appointed Chief Scout. In March 2012, Dr. Geoffrey Rothwell was named Chief Commissioner.

== Programmes and activities ==
Beaver Scout, Cub Scout, Scout and Explorer Scout programmes are offered. Bermuda Scouts in recent years have attended Scout summer camps in the United Kingdom as well as Pennsylvania and North Carolina in the United States as well as the World Jamboree in Japan in 2015, and West Virginia USA in 2019. Visiting troops from the Boy Scouts of America and Scouts Canada have also been hosted at the association's Admiral House facility and other campsites around Bermuda.

An association-wide annual event is a weekend Island Jamboree. Past events have included the "Budding Chef" activity, when Scouts compete in cooking skills.

Another island-wide annual event is the observance of Saint George's Day in April, honoring the patron saint of the Scouting movement. As in the United Kingdom, troops participate in a parade. In Bermuda this is on Front Street in Hamilton on the nearest Sunday to April 23 and attend a Scout service at one of Bermuda's churches, where a message from the Chief Scout is read and the Scout Hymn is sung. A "renewal of promise" then takes place where the Scouts renew the Scout's Promise made at joining and at all Scout meetings.

== History ==
Following the formation of The Boy Scouts Association in United Kingdom in 1910 and the grant of a royal charter of incorporation in 1912, Scouting began in Bermuda. The Governor of Bermuda became The Boy Scouts Association's Chief Scout of Bermuda.

The Boy Scouts Association's founder and Chief Scout, Robert Baden-Powell and his wife, Olave Baden-Powell, a Girl Guide leader, visited Bermuda in 1930. Olave visited again in 1951 and 1954.

The British contingent to the 14th World Scout Jamboree in 1975, led by Robert Baden-Powell, 3rd Baron Baden-Powell, included Scouts from Branches in Bermuda, Hong Kong and Rhodesia.

In 1993, the instrumental role of the Scout Association of Bermuda and Girlguiding Bermuda in developing many of the islands prominent leaders was recognised by the Bank of Bermuda Centennial Trust.

In 2004, Bermuda's Scouts participated in a 12-mile (19 km) walk to raise money for the victims of Hurricane Ivan in the Caribbean. The Category 5 storm caused extensive in Grenada, Jamaica, Grand Cayman, and Cuba.

In 2006, five Bermuda Scouts travelled to Romania to work on a housing project for the impoverished people there, as part of a Bermuda Overseas Missions and Habitat for Humanity International joint effort.

To commemorate the 100th anniversary of Scouting, the Bermuda Post Office issued a series of six "Scouting 2007 commemorative stamps," including scenes of Baden-Powell's visit to Bermuda in February, 1930. The stamps show Scouting's founder inspecting Wolf Cubs on Front Street in Hamilton and reviewing Boy Scouts on parade there.

== See also ==
- Girlguiding Bermuda
