= Laid edges =

African American style of hair

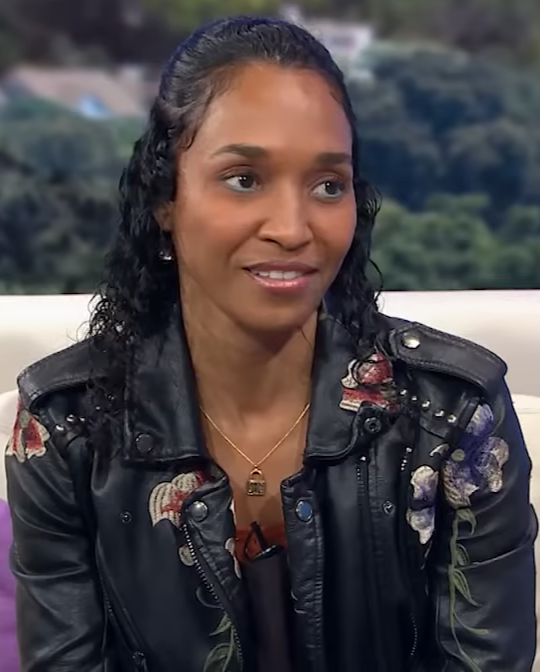
Rozonda Thomas, aka TLC's Chilli, with laid edges

Laid edges, also called slayed edges or swooped edges, refers to a style of arranging the fine "baby hairs" at the edge of the hairline into flat, decorative waves or swirls. The style is sometimes referred to as simply baby hairs, originates with Black American women who often stylized their hair in finger waves, emulating similar styles to those worn by icons such as Josephine Baker.

== History ==
A lithographic print of Josephine Baker prominently featuring her signature kiss curl

The inspiration for this style is attributed to the kiss curls sported by women in the 1920s, such as African American performer, activist, and style icon Josephine Baker. The modern laid edges style began in the 1990s in the African American community, popularized by major musicians of the period such as Chilli from TLC as well as Ginuwine, Missy Elliott, and Brandy. Laid edges have been associated with Black culture in America.

== Method ==
Typically, edges are laid using a toothbrush or other small bristle brush, to which hair gel or pomade is applied. The stylist can express their creativity by creating different designs and patterns with fine hairs. Small gems or other decorations can also be added. Edges can be laid when wearing any type of braids or protective styles, or when the hair is pulled back into a ponytail or afro puff(s). When the hair gel holding down the fine hairs begins to flake and lose its hold, one's edges are said to be "lifting."

Laid edges can also be used to blend the hairline of a wig (particularly lace wigs) or hair extensions to make them look more natural and aesthetically pleasing. In this case, many wearers trim the hairs on the hairline of the wig to create "baby hairs" to work with.

== Reactions ==
The use of the laid edges style among white or other non-Black groups has been criticized as a form of cultural appropriation or blackfishing, especially when used in conjunction with other style choices which create the effect of someone who is "not quite white" and embodies the most desirable, easily commercializable elements of African American women's appearances.

== See also ==
- Finger wave - another 1920s-era hairstyle involving gelled waves, which found popularity during the 90s
- Jheri curl - another hairstyle popular among African Americans in the 1990s
- 1990s in fashion
