= Kiss curl =

Lock of hair curled flatly onto the face

1931 French poster showing Josephine Baker with a kiss curl

A kiss curl describes a lock of hair curling onto the face and usually plastered down. Although the curl could be flattened with saliva (hence its alternative name spit curl), soap or hair lotion is more typically used.

== History ==
=== Pre-20th century ===
In the late seventeenth century, there was a fashion for fringes composed of curls described as fripons, guigne-galants, or 'kiss-curls', sometimes augmented with false hair.

=== 20th-century onwards ===
The kiss curl style was worn by both men and women.

It became a trademark of the singer Bill Haley, who wore a large kiss curl over his right eye to divert attention from his left eye, which was blind. Other people known for their kiss curls included Josephine Baker, Diana Ross, and the fictional character Superman.

In early episodes of the TV drama series Agatha Christie's Poirot, Poirot's assistant, Miss Lemon, portrayed by Pauline Moran, appears with five kiss curls across her forehead.

In the 1990s, kiss curls inspired the trend of laid edges, notably worn by Chilli in the girl group TLC.

== See also ==
- List of hairstyles
- Lovelock (hair) braided hair to the side, sometimes on the forehead
