= Five Orders of Periwigs =

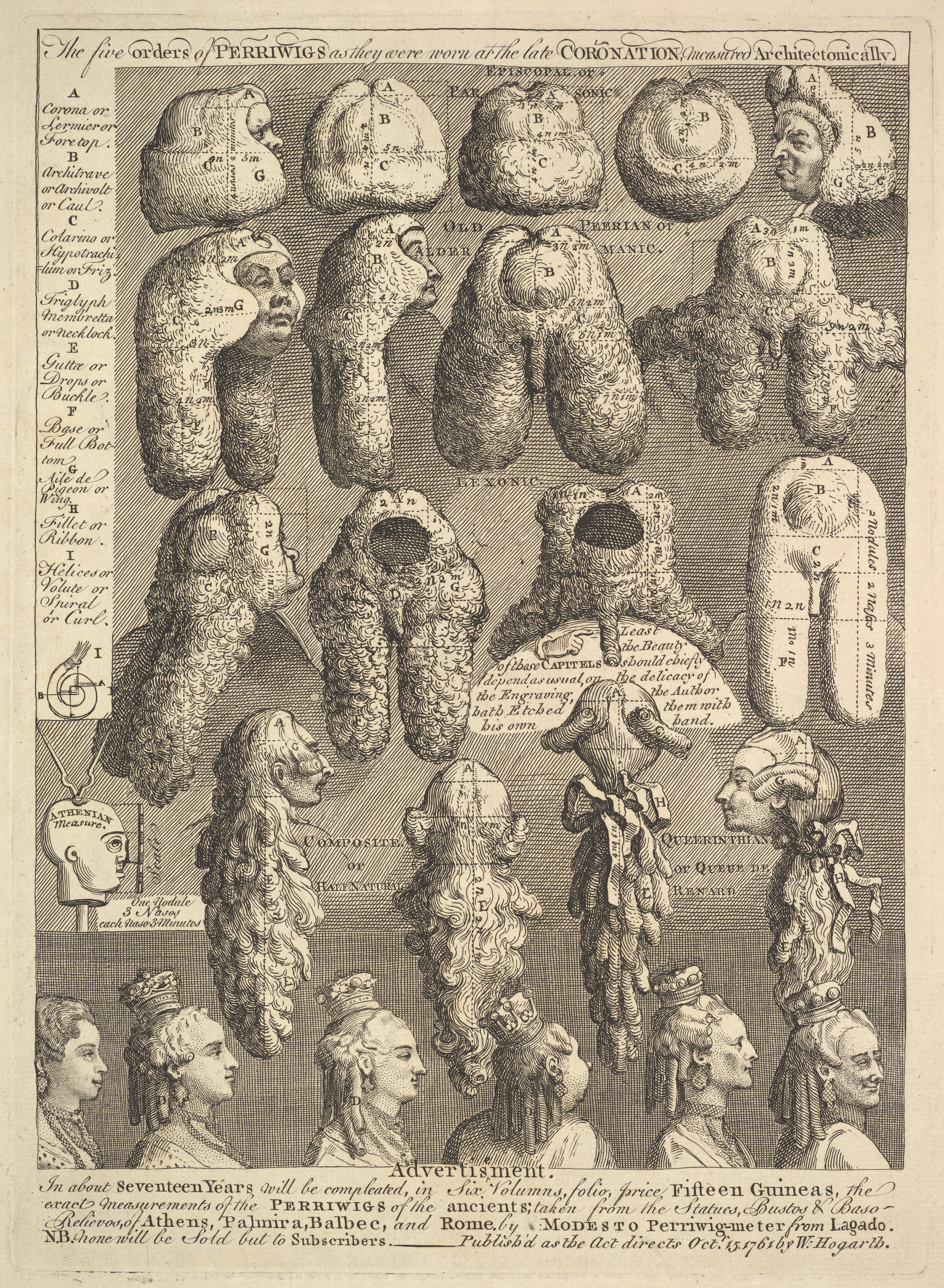
The Five Orders of Perriwigs as they were Worn at the Late Coronation Measured Architectonically, William Hogarth, 1761.

The Five Orders of Periwigs (The Five Orders of Perriwigs as they were Worn at the Late Coronation Measured Architectonically) is a 1761 engraving by the English artist William Hogarth. It contains several levels of satire. First, and most clearly, it lampoons the fashion for outlandish wigs in the mid to late 18th century. Second, in classifying the wigs into "orders", it satirises the formulation of canons of beauty from the analysis of surviving pieces of classical architecture and sculpture from ancient Greece and ancient Rome, particularly the classical remains at Athens, Rome, Baalbek, and Palmyra, and the precise architectural drawings of James "Athenian" Stuart (published in the Antiquities of Athens, the first volume of which appeared in 1762). To the lower right, the engraving gives its publication date as 15 October 1761.

Of the engraving, Hogarth himself commented in his book of anecdotes:

There is no great difficulty in measuring the length, breadth, or height of any figures, where the parts are made up of plain lines. It requires no more skill to take the dimensions of a pillar or cornice, than to measure a square box, and yet the man who does the latter is neglected, and he who accomplishes the former, is considered as a miracle of genius; but I suppose he receives his honours for the distance he has travelled to do his business.

As a parallel to the five orders of classical architecture identified by Palladio (Doric, Ionic, Corinthian, Composite and Tuscan), the engraving postulates five "orders" of periwig, from the relatively simple "Episcopal" (for the clergy), through the "Old Peerian or Aldermanic" (for lords and council officials) and "Lexonic" (for lawyers) to the more ornate "Composite or Half Natural", and finally the effete "Queerinthian or Queue de Reynard" (a pun on the French for "foxtail").

A scale shows the "Athenian Measure" by which the dimensions of each wig are annotated, with one "nodule" comprising 3 "nasos" (noses) and each "naso" of 3 "minutes". The component parts of each wig are labelled with letters A to I, each denoting a mock architectural term, from A: the "Corona or Lermier or Foretop" and B: the "Architrave or Archivolt or Caul" to H: "Fillet or Ribbon" and I: "Helices or Volute or Spiral or Curl".

Several of the faces depicted have been identified. Those in the Episcopal line are intended to resemble Doctor William Warburton, Bishop of Gloucester (left) and Doctor Samuel Squire, Bishop of St David's (right). In the "Old Peerian or Aldermanic" row are Lord Melcombe (left) and another. The wig depicted to the far right is a "remarkable winged periwig" worn by Sir Samuel Fludyer, 1st Baronet when he became Lord Mayor of London earlier in 1761.

At the bottom of the engraving is an inscription stating that a series of six folio volumes published over 17 years will set out the measurements of the periwigs of the ancients. This satirises Stuart's Antiquities of Athens. Above, a line of female profiles shows, from left to right, the face of Queen Charlotte and five others, each wearing a triple necklace and bearing a coronet: a duchess, a marchioness, a countess, a viscountess, and a baroness. They have been alternatively identified as the Ladies of the Bedchamber in 1761: the Duchess of Ancaster, Duchess of Hamilton, Countess of Effingham, Countess of Northumberland, Viscountess Weymouth, and Viscountess Bolingbroke.

Hogarth created the engraving a few weeks after the coronation of George III and Queen Charlotte, inspired by the elaborate costume worn by those who attended. Horace Walpole wrote: "Some of the peeresses were dressed over night, slept in armchairs, and were waked if they tumbled their heads".

A number of spelling mistakes were noted in the first state of the engraving ("advertisment", "volumns"). A second state of the engraving corrects a typographical error by inserting the letter "e" in "advertisment", and relabels the "Episcopal" order of periwigs as "Episcopal and Parsonic".

== See also ==
- List of works by William Hogarth
