= Lace wig =

Type of wig

A lace wig or a lace front wig is a special type of hairpiece or wig in which human hair or synthetic hair is tied by hand to a sheer lace base which goes over the scalp.

== History ==
Wigs have been used since antiquity as hairstyles and costumes; ancient Egyptians wore wigs to shield their shaved heads from the sun. Wigs were kept in place by using beeswax and resin. Wigs were once made from horsehair, wool, buffalo hair or even feathers. Other ancient cultures, including the Assyrians, Phoenicians, Greeks and Romans, also used wigs as an everyday fashion. There was intermittent use of wigs in many cultures throughout history including the prophylactic use of them in England in the 1600s to help protect from head lice.

The modern wig was adopted by Louis XIII to cover his balding head. By the late 1600s, both wigs and handmade lace headpieces were common with European and North American upper classes as daily fashion. Wigs were made of human, horse, and yak hair and sewn onto a frame with silken thread were meant to be obvious as wigs and not the wearer's actual hair. Powdered wigs in rows of curls, known as periwigs, were adopted as court dress in many cultures with elaborate curls and style.

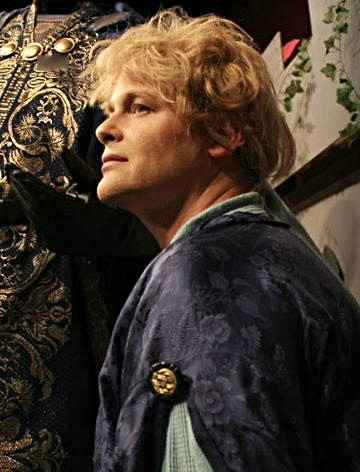
Actor in a human hair, lacefront wig

After the American Revolutionary War, styles in North America changed and the wig as a sign of social class died out of use. Wigs began to be used more to augment natural hair for elaborate hairstyles, for religious reasons, or to cover hair loss in both genders and therefore were required to blend with the wearer's natural hair. The selling of human hair by the lower classes for use in wigs by the upper classes was captured in stories like "The Gift of the Magi" and Little Women.

In the 19th century a new wig-making method began to replace the weft method most commonly used prior. A small hook called a "ventilating needle", similar to the tambour hooks used for decorating fabric with chain-stitch embroidery at that period, is used to knot a few strands of hair at a time directly to a suitable foundation material. By the 1870s, the lace machine had made lace affordable through mass production and the use of lace as foundation material for wigs entered popular use. Using lace allowed for a more natural-looking wig because the flesh-colored lace is almost imperceptible. The more common use was a strip of lace just at the front, known as a lace front wig, which gives the impression of a natural hairline.

== Modern usage ==
Full lace wigs may have a base made entirely of lace. Full lace wigs can be pulled into a high ponytail and up-do's, as opposed to lace front wigs. Full lace wigs allow for the most versatility when it comes to styling for all lace wig types. They allow for a natural hairline and natural looking parting areas throughout the wig. If a lace front wig was pulled back, it is usually obvious that it is a wig. In 2016, 360 Degree Lace Wigs were created allowing wig wearers to wear undetectable ponytail styles.

Lace front wigs are more common and the remainder of the wig is made out of a less fragile material which is less susceptible to ripping or tearing than the lace. The lace front wig allows the wearer to choose a hairline. The lace is only in the front half of the wig, to allow the wearer to part the hair any way they want. Modern day lace wigs can be worn while doing activities like swimming and exercising, which make it a popular choice among alternatives. It is also an excellent alternative for anyone looking to avoid adding hair to the scalp via surgical methods.

The lace wig is usually attached with the assistance of glues and tapes, which are applied to the front hairline area. Once the glue has dried, the front lace portion of the wig is affixed to the area where the glue has been applied on the hairline, creating a tight bond which keeps the lace wig in place on the head. Some lace wigs also have what is referred to as "baby hair" around the temple areas which is used to cover up any visible signs of lace on the forehead, and the baby hair also helps to create a realistic hairline. Once applied the lace or lace front wig can stay in place for weeks at a time and maintained with shampoo and styling in the meantime.

Lace wig density is measured as a percentage. The higher the percentage, the thicker the hair density on the wig. The popular density on the market is 130% and 150%. The higher the percentage, the higher price consumers pay. Like other hair extension products, the texture of wigs varies from straight, loose wave, natural wave, to deep curly, etc.
