= Wig =

Head accessory that mimics hair

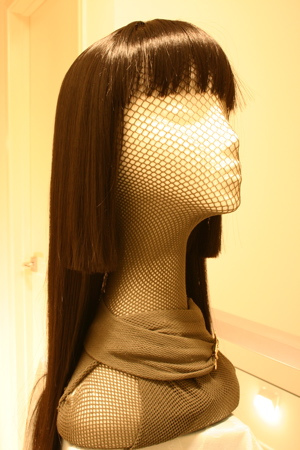
A conventional hime cut wig

A wig is a head covering made from human or animal hair, or a synthetic imitation thereof. The word is short for "periwig", derived from the French word perruque. Wigs may be worn to disguise baldness, to alter the wearer's appearance, or as part of certain professional uniforms.

== History ==
=== Ancient and medieval use ===
In Egyptian society men and women commonly had clean-shaven or close-cropped hair and often wore wigs. The ancient Egyptians created the wig to shield shaved, hairless heads from the sun. They also wore the wigs on top of their hair using beeswax and resin to keep the wigs in place. Wealthy Egyptians would wear elaborate wigs and scented head cones of animal fat on top of their wigs. Other ancient cultures, including the Assyrians, Phoenicians, Jews in ancient Israel and Judea, Greeks, and Romans, also used wigs as an everyday fashion.

Examples of ancient wigs
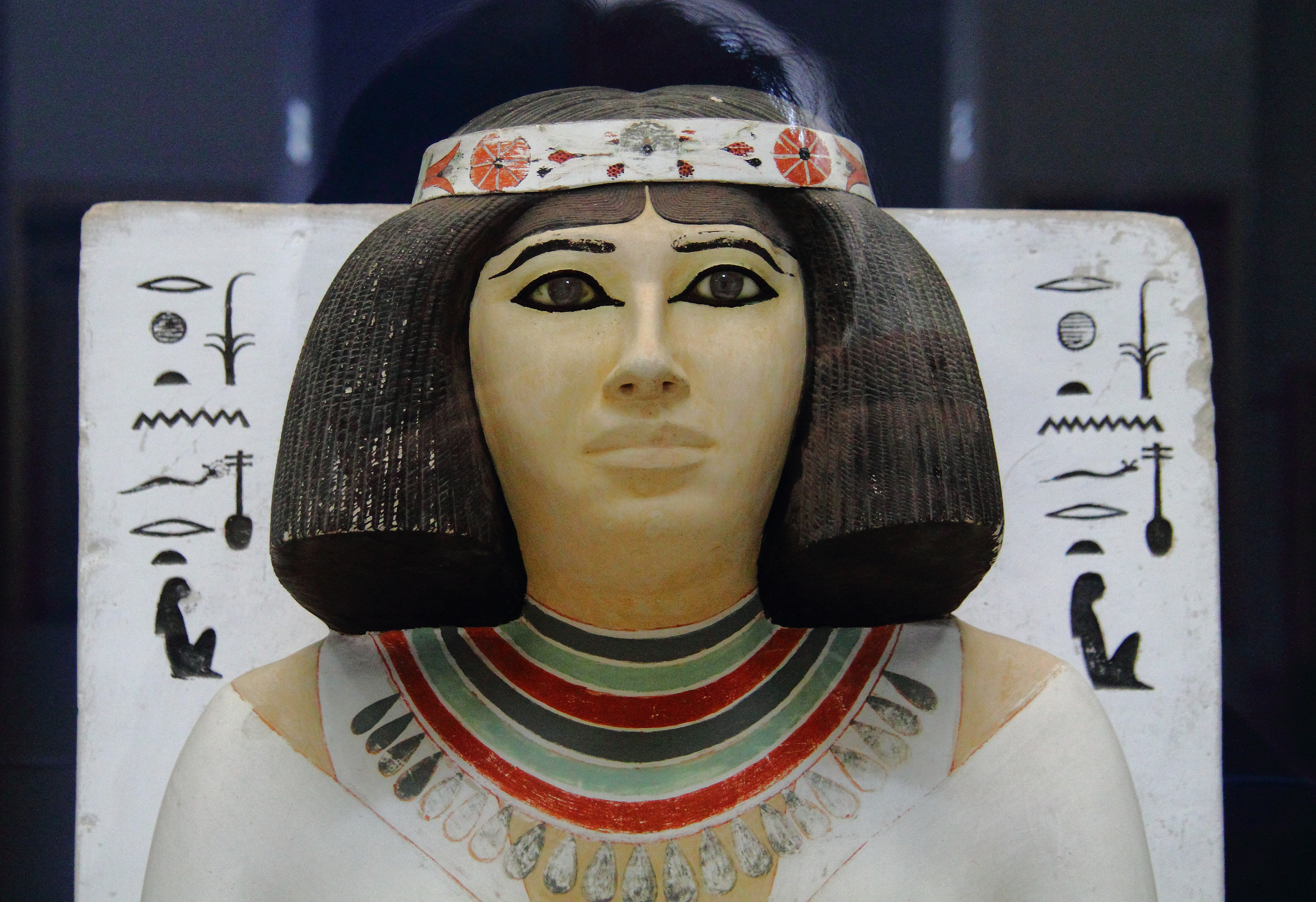
Statue of princess Nofret wearing a wig (c. 2613 to 2494 BC)

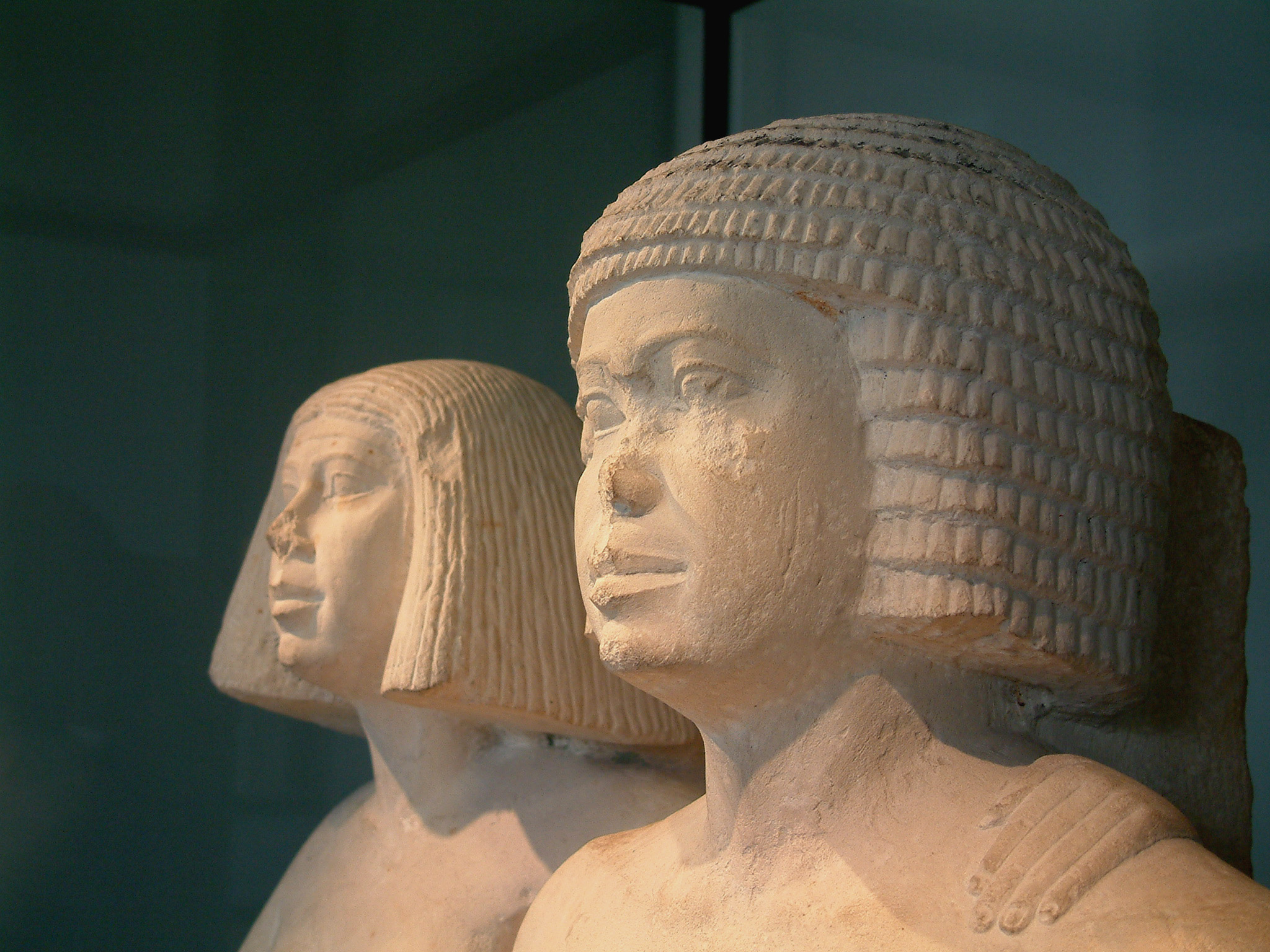
Egyptian couple wearing formal wigs of the 4th or 5th dynasties

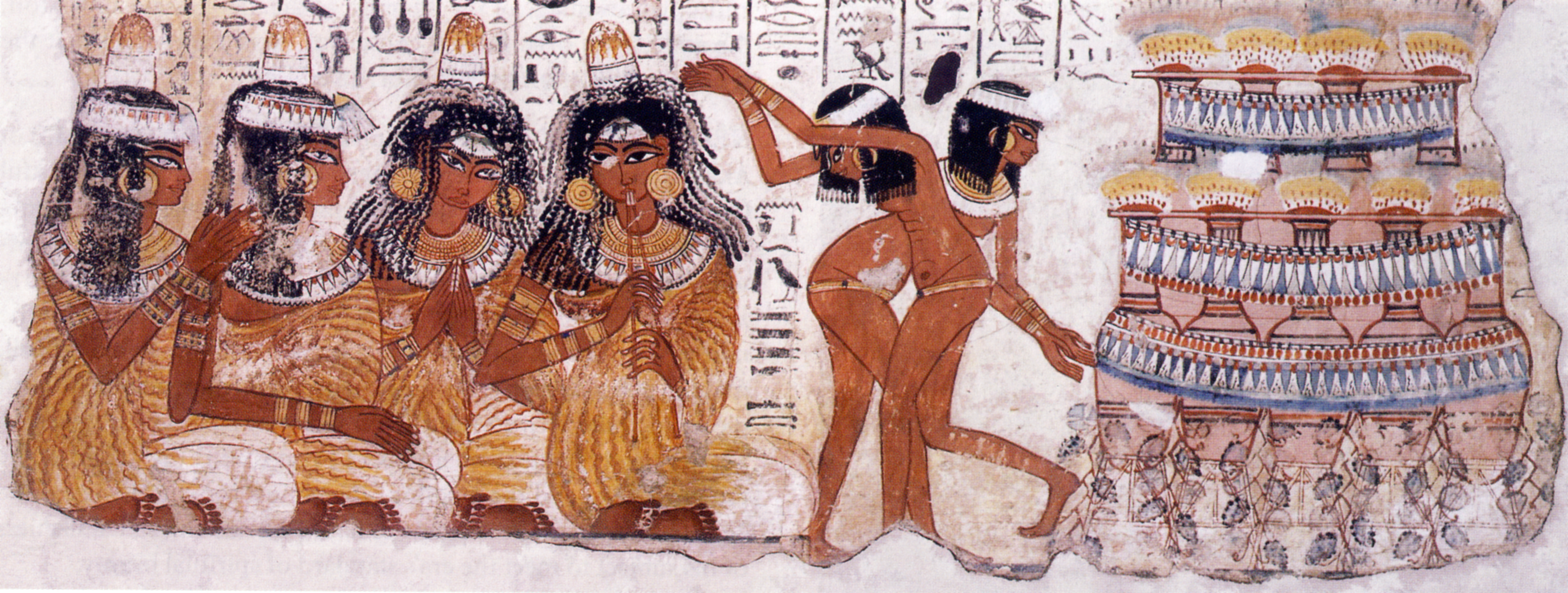
Tomb fresco depicting dancers and musicians in elaborate wigs with head cones. Thebes, Egypt, 18th Dynasty.

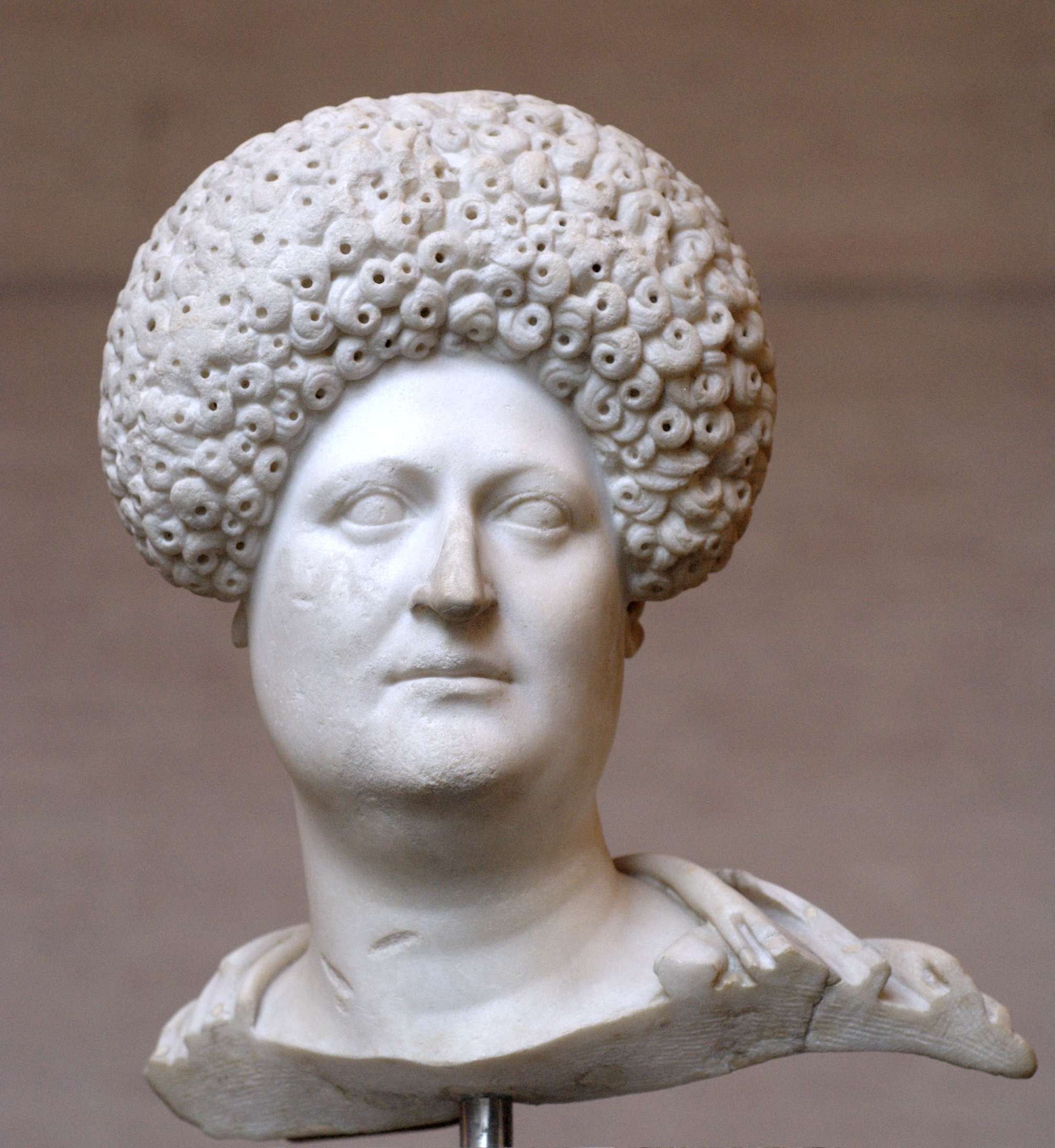
Bust of a Roman woman wearing a "diadem" wig, c. 80 CE

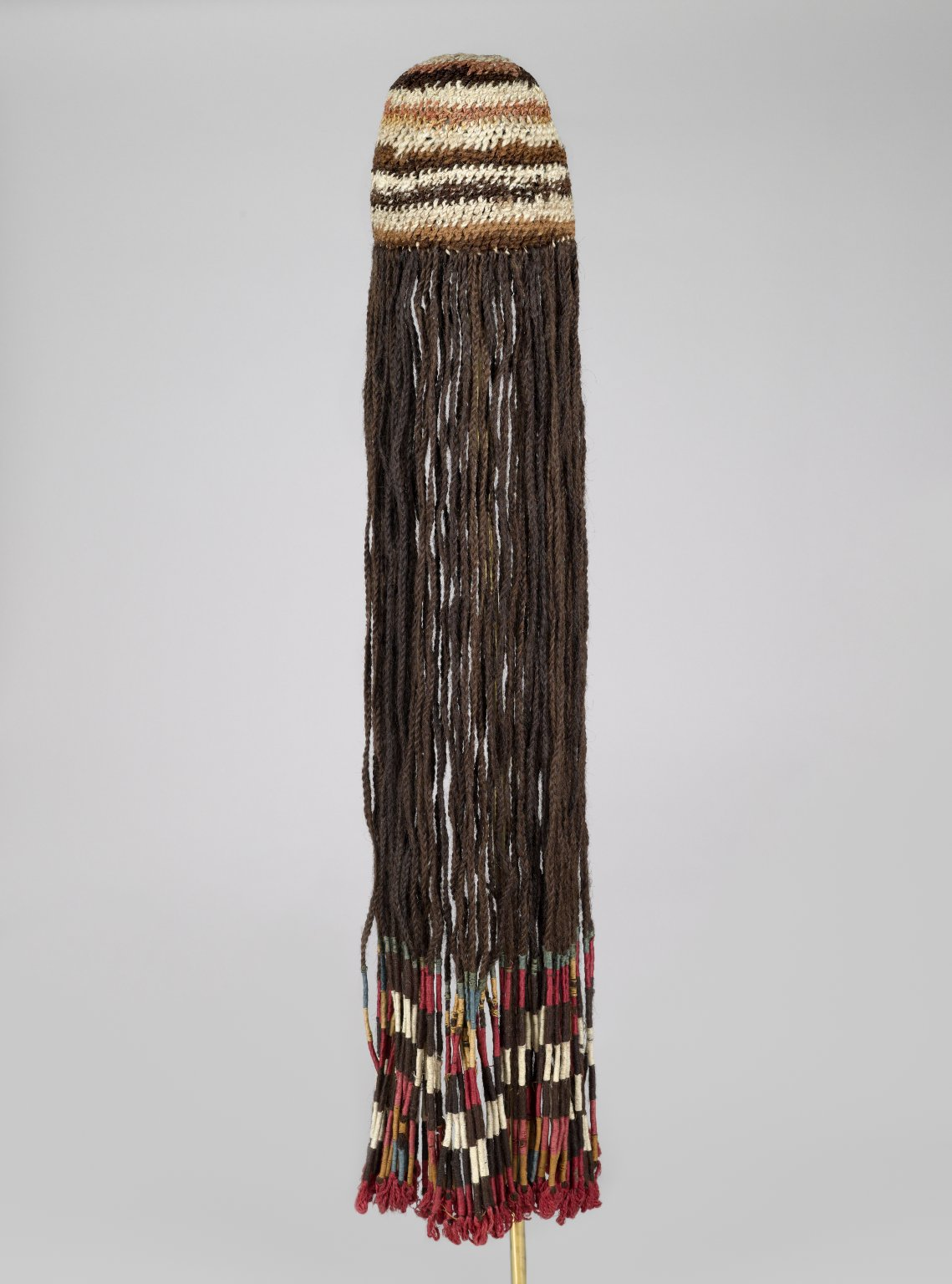
Wig Headdress, Wari People, 600–1000 CE, Brooklyn Museum

In China, the popularization of the wig started in the Spring and Autumn period.

In Japan, the upper classes started wearing wigs before the Nara period.

In Korea, gache were popular among women during the Goryeo dynasty until they were banned in the late 18th century.

=== Medieval Europe ===
After the fall of the Western Roman Empire, the use of wigs fell into disuse in the West for a thousand years. Several cultural and religious factors contributed to the decline of wigs during this period. Christian ideals emphasized modesty and austerity in appearance, and elaborate cosmetic practices such as wigs were often discouraged. Women typically covered their hair with veils, wimples, or other head coverings, especially after marriage, which further reduced the need for artificial hairpieces. Although full wigs were rare, some limited use of hairpieces and false hair did occur. Archaeological evidence and historical records suggest that extensions or artificial tresses were occasionally used to enhance hairstyles, particularly among elites. In some cases these hairpieces were attached to caps or nets rather than constructed as complete wigs. When wigs were used in the medieval period, they could consist of hair attached to leather caps, sometimes made from human or animal hair. These early forms were often poorly fitted and were not widely adopted.

=== 16th and 17th centuries ===
Wearing wigs was revived in the 16th century as a means of compensating for hair loss or improving one's personal appearance. They also served a practical purpose: the unhygienic conditions of the time meant that hair attracted head lice, a problem that could be much reduced if natural hair were shaved and replaced with a more easily de-loused artificial hairpiece. Fur hoods were also used in a similar preventive fashion.

Royal patronage was crucial to the revival of the wig. Queen Elizabeth I famously wore a red wig, tightly and elaborately curled in a "Roman" style, while among men King Louis XIII (1601–1643) started to pioneer wig-wearing in 1624 when he had prematurely begun to bald. This fashion was largely promoted by his son and successor Louis XIV (1638–1715), which contributed to its spread in Europe and European-influenced countries in the 1660s. Wig-wearing remained a dominant style among men for about 140 years until the change of dress in the 1790s which was affected by the French Revolution (1789–1799).

Periwigs for men were introduced into the English-speaking world with other French styles when Charles II was restored to the throne in 1660, following a lengthy exile in France. These wigs were shoulder-length or longer, imitating the long hair that had become fashionable among men since the 1620s. Their use soon became popular in the English court. The London diarist Samuel Pepys recorded the day in 1665 that a barber had shaved his head and that he tried on his new periwig for the first time, but in a year of plague he was uneasy about wearing it:

3rd September 1665: Up, and put on my coloured silk suit, very fine, and my new periwig, bought a good while since, but darst not wear it because the plague was in Westminster when I bought it. And it is a wonder what will be the fashion after the plague is done as to periwigs, for nobody will dare to buy any haire for fear of the infection? That it had been cut off the heads of people dead of the plague.

Wigs were not without other drawbacks, as Pepys noted on March 27, 1663:

I did go to the Swan; and there sent for Jervas my old periwig-maker and he did bring me a periwig; but it was full of nits, so as I was troubled to see it (it being his old fault) and did send him to make it clean.

With wigs virtually obligatory garb for men with social rank, wigmakers gained considerable prestige. A wigmakers' guild was established in France in 1665, a development soon copied elsewhere in Europe. Their job was a skilled one as 17th century wigs were extraordinarily elaborate, covering the back and shoulders and flowing down the chest; not surprisingly, they were also extremely heavy and often uncomfortable to wear. Such wigs were expensive to produce. The best examples were made from natural human hair. The hair of horses and goats was often used as a cheaper alternative.

Several contemporary writings which have survived noted that some viewed men who wore wigs as looking deformed and emasculated. It especially attracted disapproval from Puritans, and during times of plague, it was said that wigs were made of hair of plague victims.

Wigs required cleaning using fuller's earth, and the powder used to freshen it was made from low grade flour and scented with pomatum.

Examples of wigs in the 16th and 17th centuries
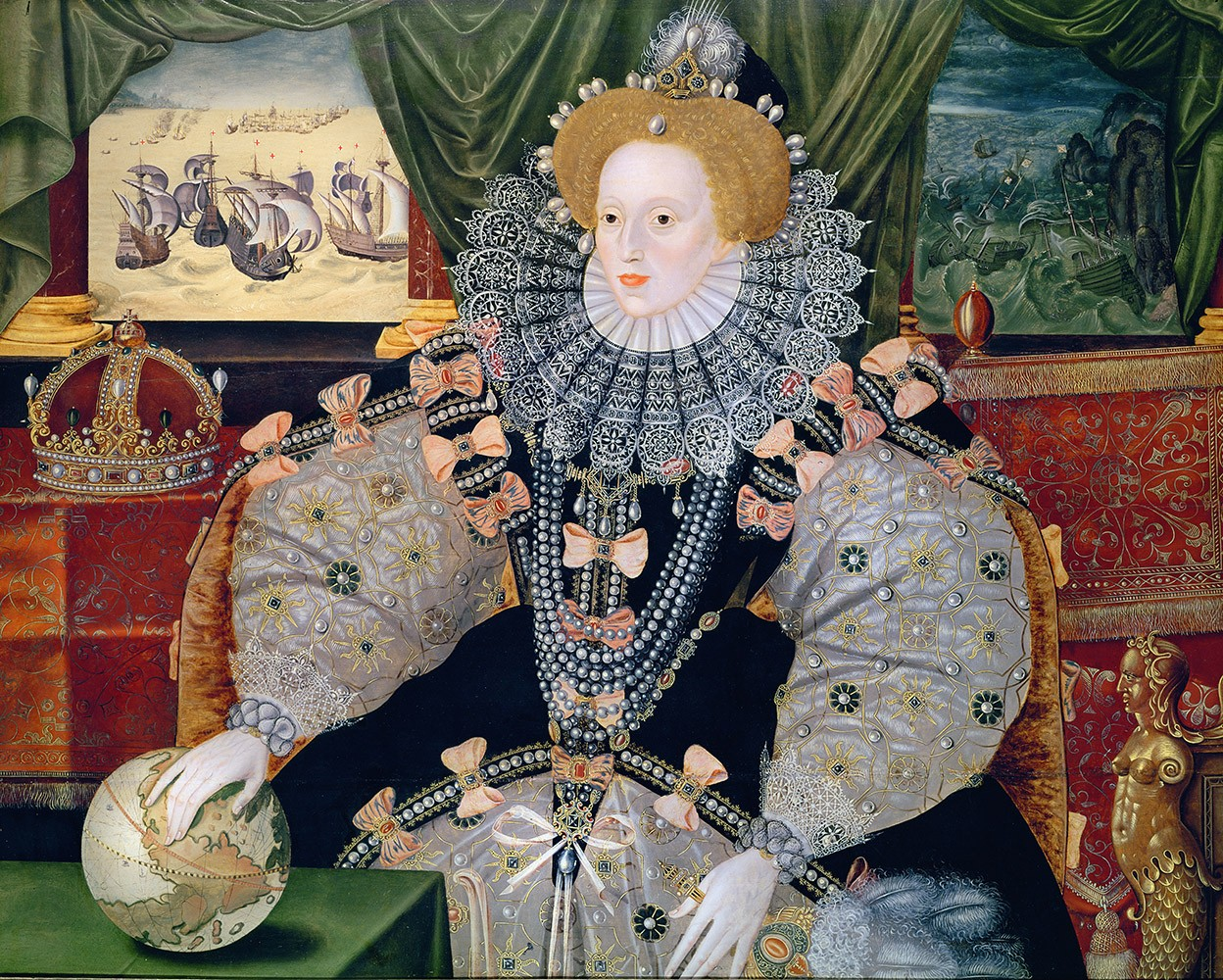
Queen Elizabeth I, painted in 1588

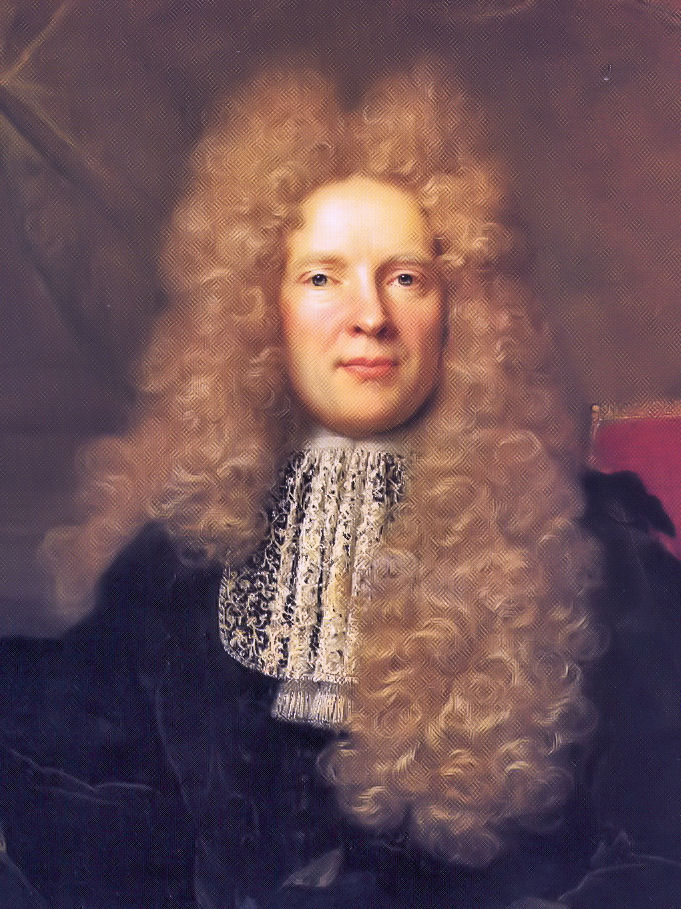
Nicolas de Vermont

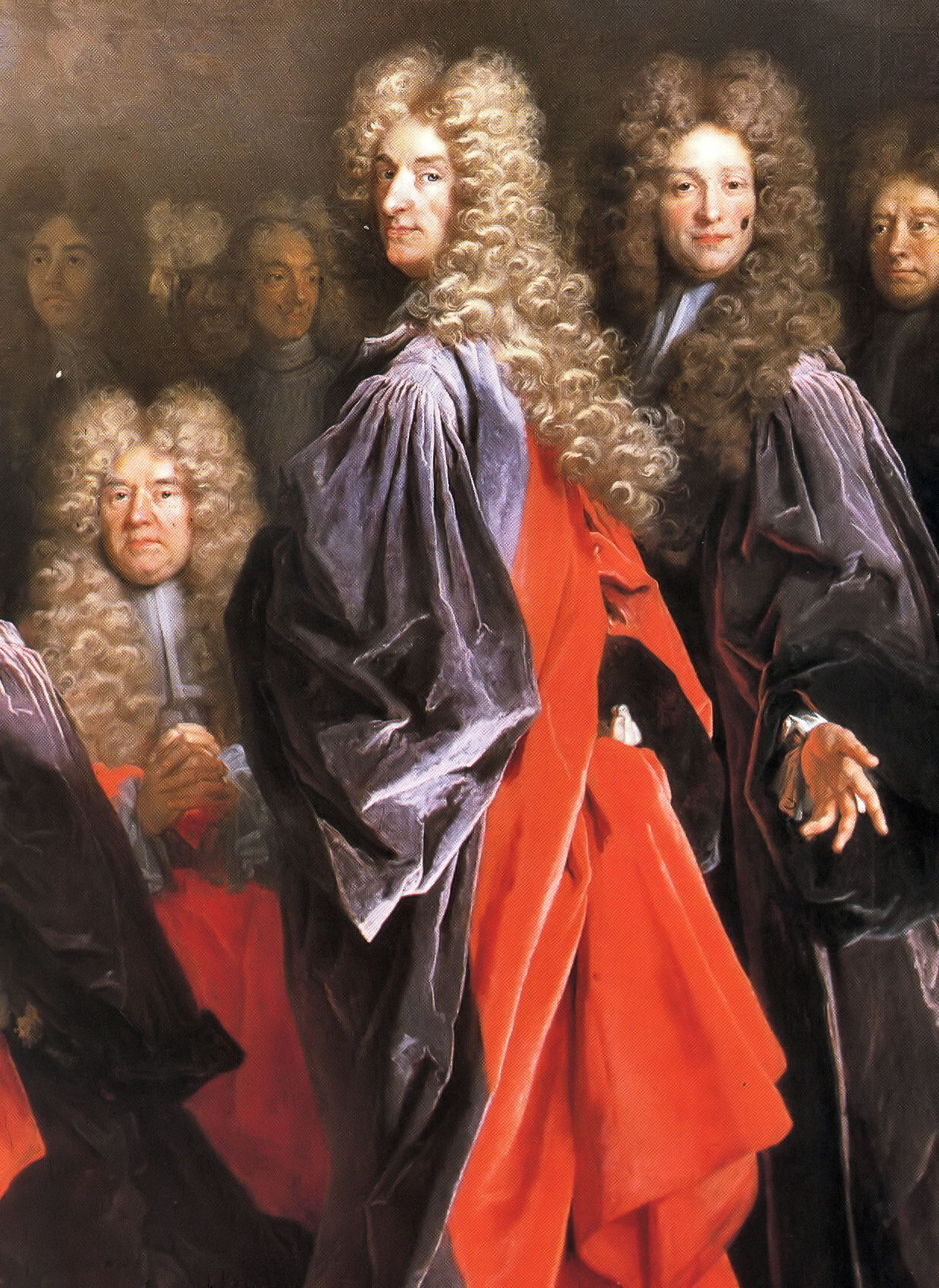
Portrait of men wearing wigs by Nicolas de Largillière, 17th century

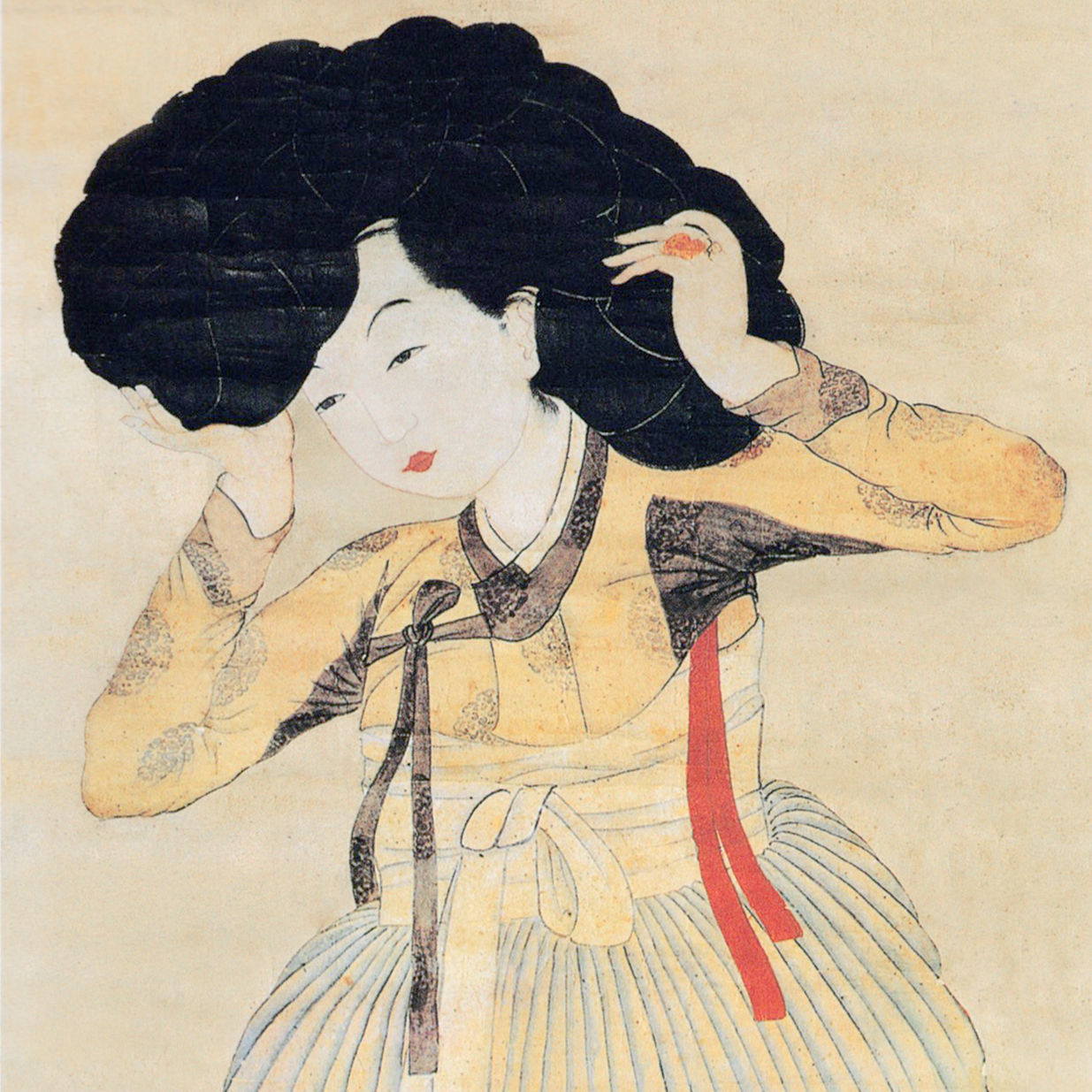
Korean traditional wig (gache)

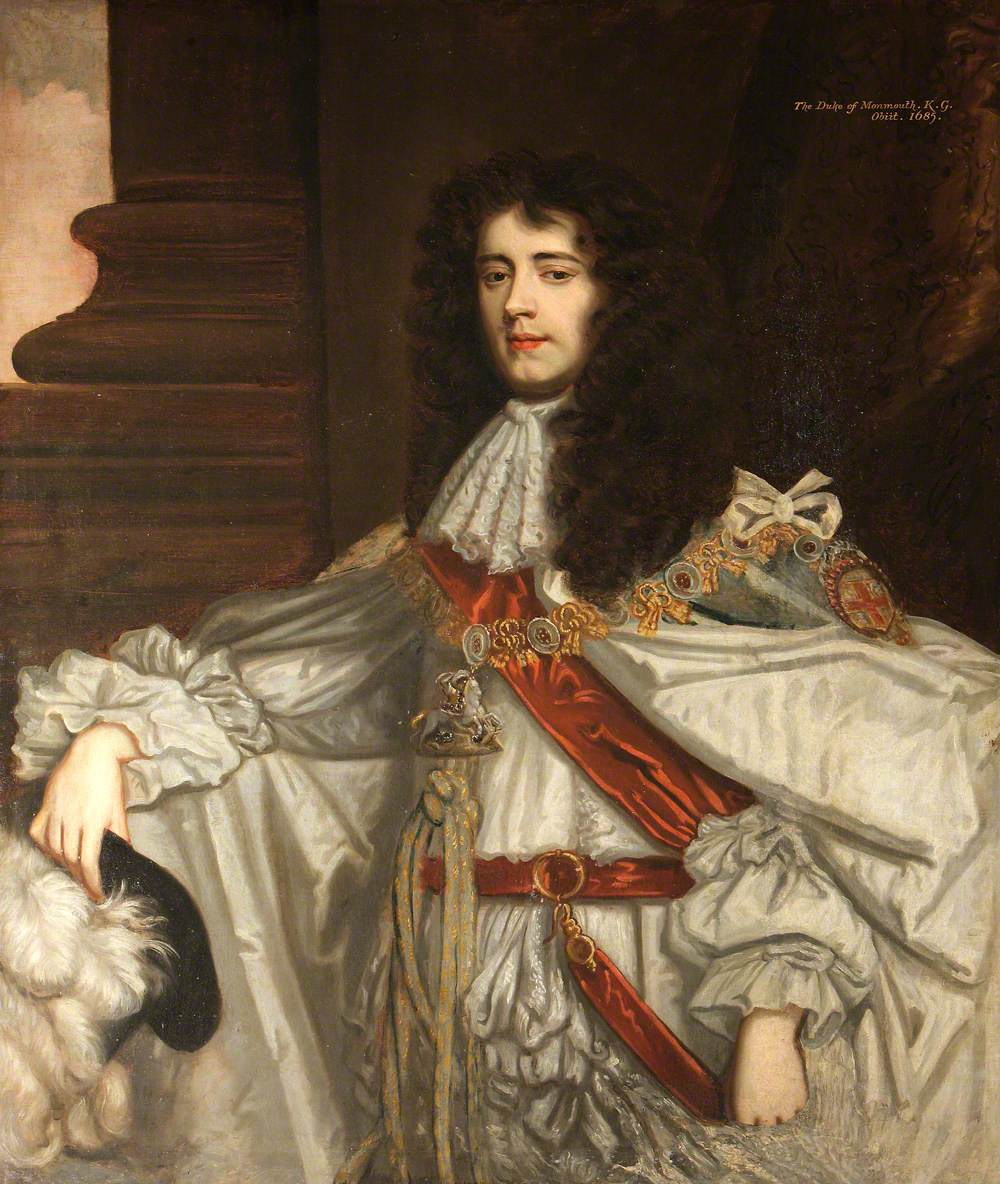
James Scott, 1st Duke of Monmouth, (illegitimate son of Charles II of England)

=== 18th century ===
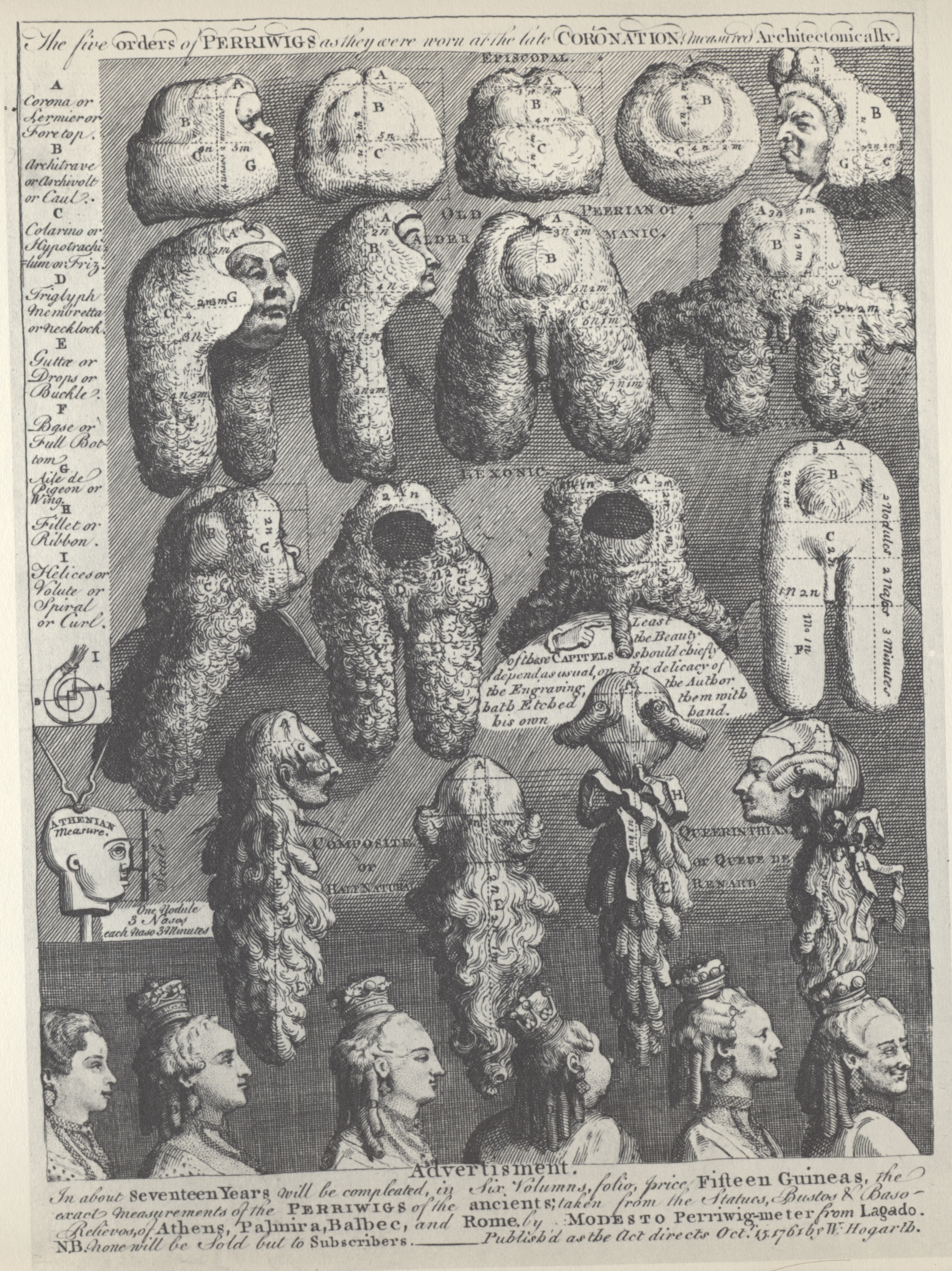
Five Orders of Periwigs, 1761

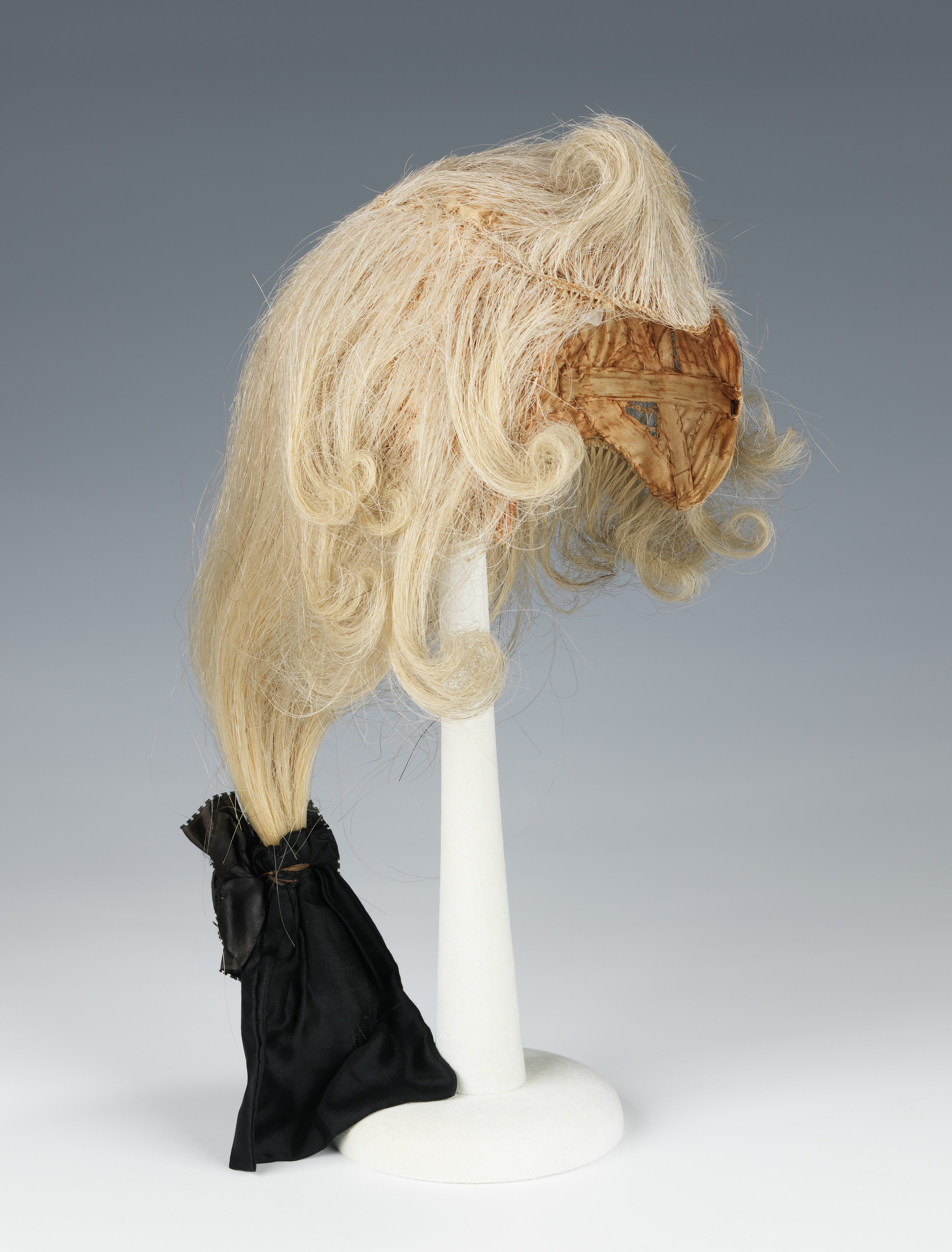
Wig, 1780–1800. Wigs that had the back hair enclosed in a bag were called bag wigs.

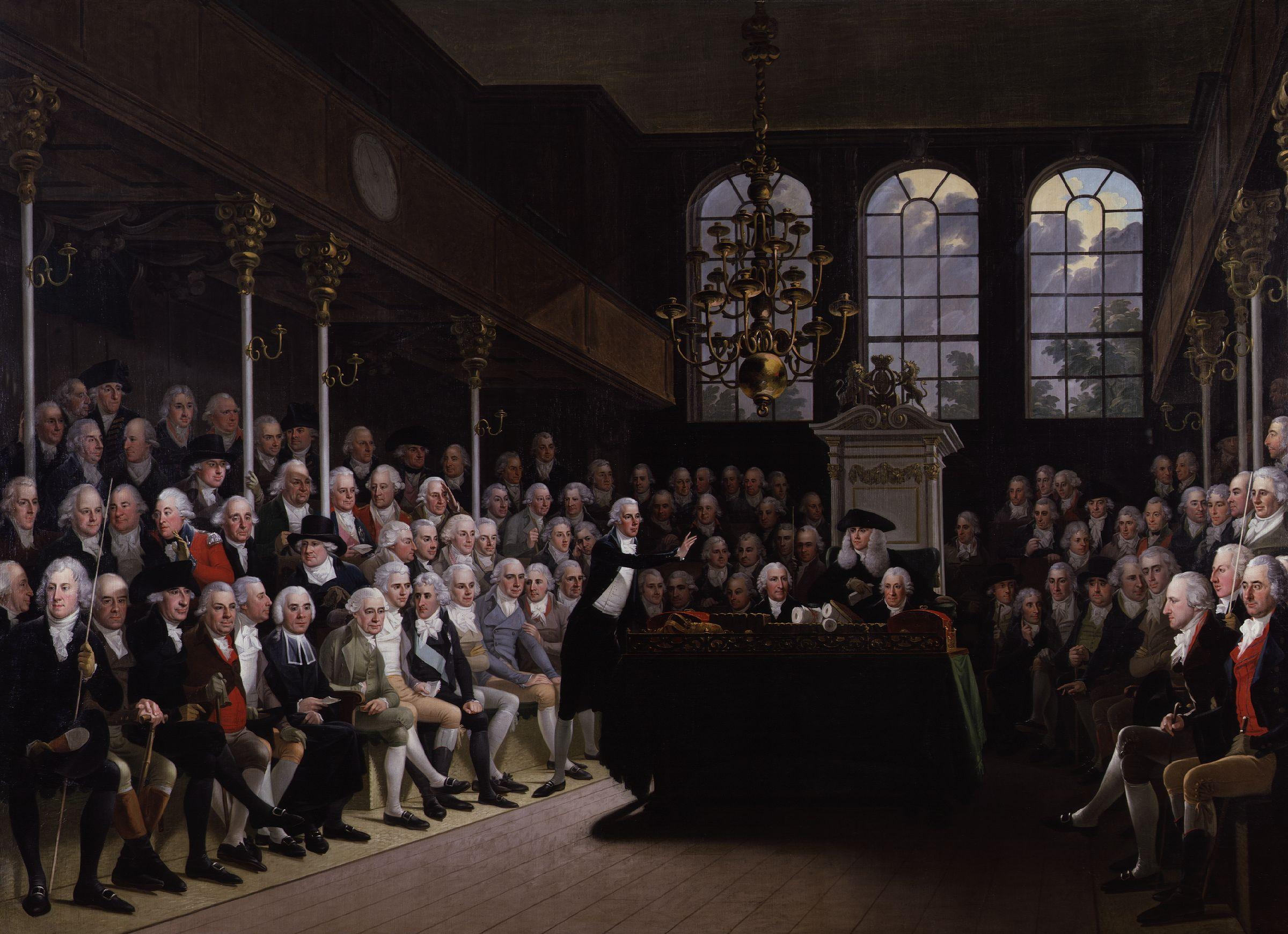
William Pitt the Younger (1759-1806, standing centre) in Parliament in 1793. Pitt and members of Parliament wore powdered wigs at that time; in 1795 Parliament passed the Duty on Hair Powder Act which caused the demise of the fashion for both wigs and powder.

In the 18th century, men's wigs were powdered to give them their distinctive white or off-white color. Women in the 18th century did not wear wigs, but wore a coiffure supplemented by artificial hair or hair from other sources. Powdered wigs (men) and powdered natural hair with supplemental hairpieces (women) became essential for full dress occasions and continued in use until almost the end of the 18th century.

The elaborate form of wigs worn at the coronation of George III in 1761 was lampooned by William Hogarth in his engraving Five Orders of Periwigs. Powdering wigs and extensions was messy and inconvenient, and the development of the naturally white or off-white powderless wig (made of horsehair) for men made the retention of wigs in everyday court dress a practical possibility. By 1765, wig-wearing went out of fashion except for some occupational groups such as coachmen and lawyers. During this period, people tended to simply wear their natural hair, styled and powdered to resemble a wig. However, the trend revived extravagantly during the Macaroni period of the 1770s. Women mainly powdered their hair grey, or blue-ish grey, and from the 1770s onwards never bright white like men. Wig powder was made from finely ground starch that was scented with orange flower, lavender, or orris root. Wig powder was occasionally colored violet, blue, pink or yellow, but was most often off-white.

By the 1780s, young men were setting a fashion trend by lightly powdering their natural hair, as women had already done from the 1770s onwards. After 1790, both wigs and powder were reserved for older, more conservative men, and were in use by ladies being presented at court. After 1790, English women seldom powdered their hair.

In 1795, the British prime minister William Pitt the Younger levied a tax on hair powder of one guinea per year. This tax effectively caused the demise of both the fashion for wigs and powder. Granville Leveson-Gower, in Paris during the winter of 1796, at the height of the Thermidorian Directory, noted "The word citoyen seemed but very little in use, and hair powder being very common, the appearance of the people was less democratic than in England."

Among women in the French court of Versailles in the mid-to-late 18th century, large, elaborate and often themed wigs (such as the stereotypical "boat poufs") were in vogue. These combed-up hair extensions were often very heavy, weighted down with pomades, powders, and other ornamentation. In the late 18th century these coiffures (along with many other indulgences in court life) became symbolic of the decadence of the French nobility, and for that reason quickly became out of fashion from the beginning of the French Revolution in 1789.

During the 18th century, men's wigs became smaller and more formal with several professions adopting them as part of their official costumes. This tradition survives in a few legal systems. They are routinely worn in various countries of the Commonwealth. Until 1832, bishops of the Church of England and Church of Ireland wore ceremonial wigs. The wigs worn by barristers are in the style favoured in the late eighteenth century. Judges' wigs, in everyday use as court dress, are short like barristers' wigs (although in a slightly different style), but for ceremonial occasions judges and also senior barristers (KCs) wear full-bottomed wigs.

In the 18th century, wigmaking was a craft guild in multiple cities. The guilds, government, and others were constantly concerned about quality. The Lyon Wigmaker Guild petitioned local magistrates to uphold statutes banning bleached human hair, as well as wild goat and lamb hair. The guild officers claimed that the process of bleaching damaged the hair too much, thereby forcing a wigmaker to sell a faulty product to consumers. As for the wild goat and lamb hair, they claimed it was too coarse to style. 18th century French wigmakers used an interesting technique to ensure that the hair retained moisture: baking hair into dough. In Paris, gingerbread bakers would routinely bake hair dough for wigmakers, although in other French cities, it was not necessarily gingerbread. Taxes on hair dough baking were proposed in 1705. In Grenoble, wigmakers complained that such tax obligations "destroy the liberty of commerce; because no baker is obliged to bake wigmakers' hair dough, instead doing it for them as a courtesy."

Examples of 18th century wigs
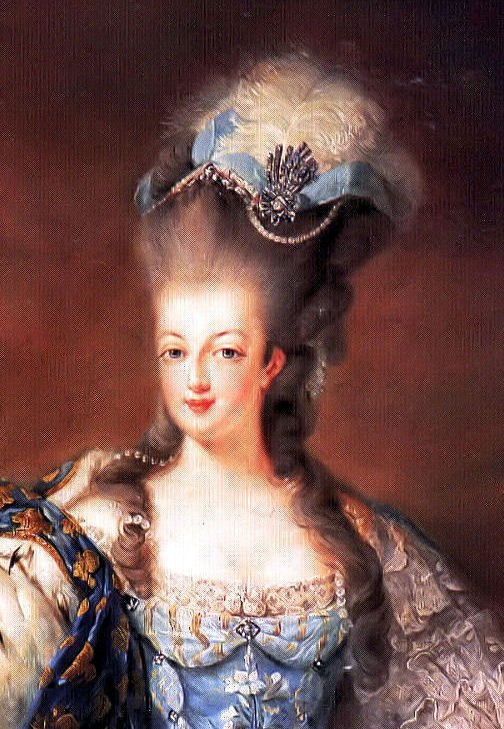
Marie Antoinette wearing the distinctive pouf style coiffure; her own natural hair is extended on the top with an artificial hairpiece.

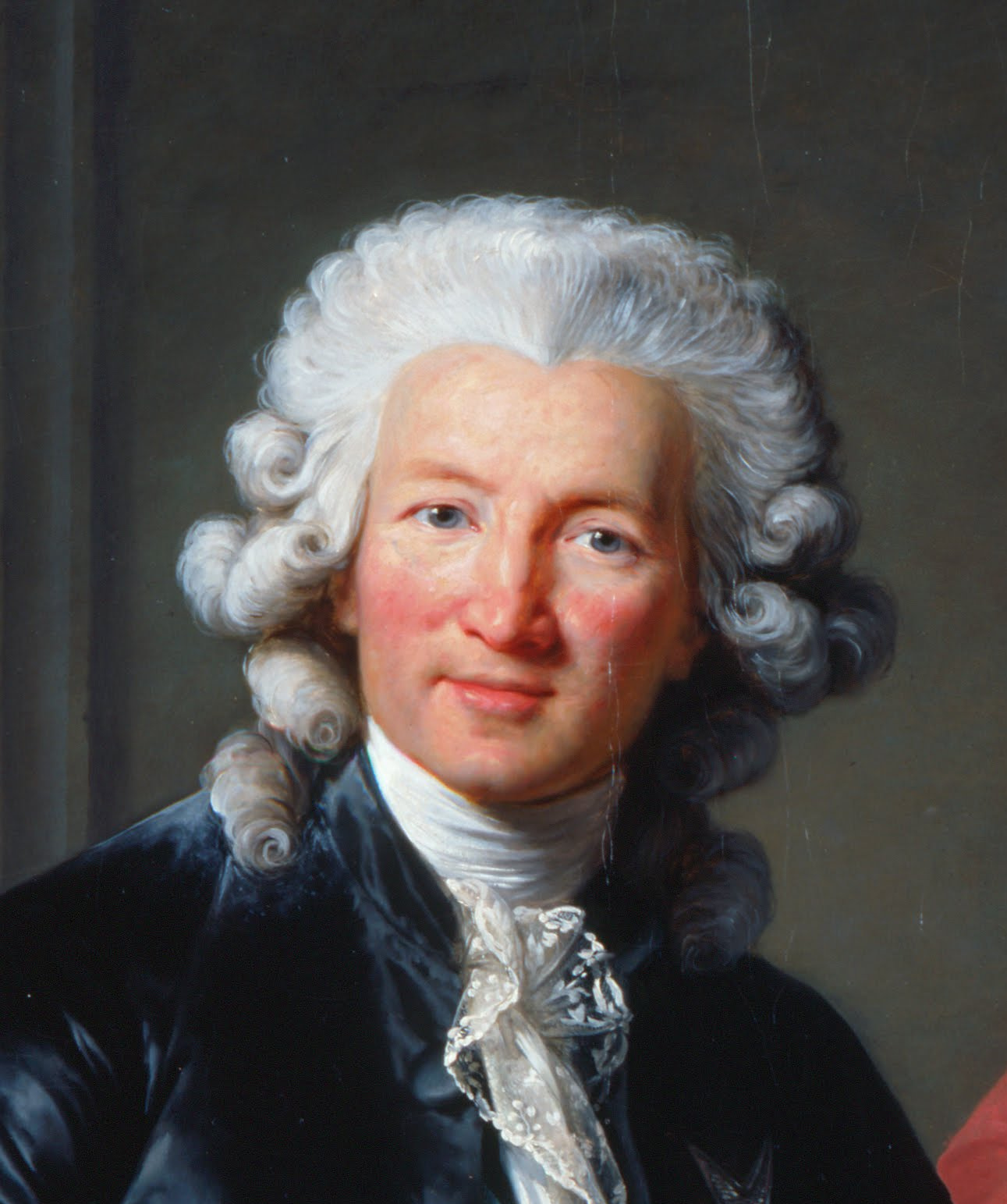
Charles-Alexandre de Calonne by Élisabeth-Louise Vigée-Le Brun (1784), London, Royal Collection

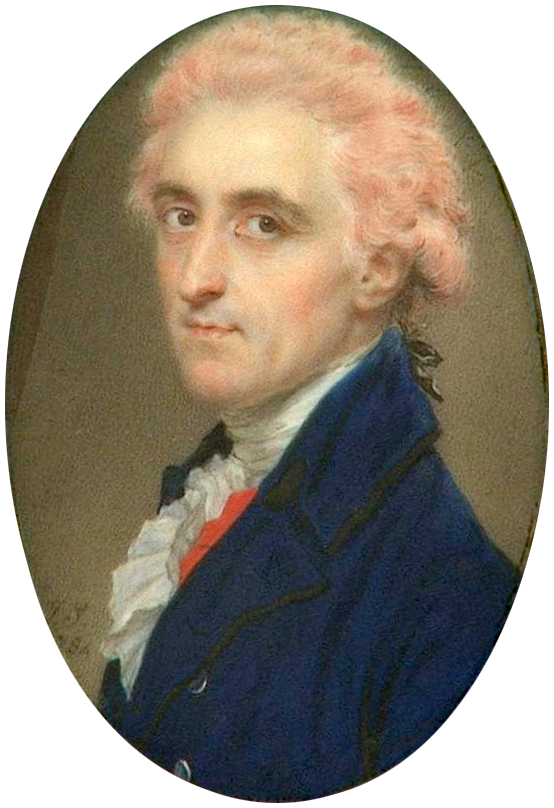
Colonel James Hamilton by John Smart (1784), wearing a white wig powdered with pink-coloured powder.

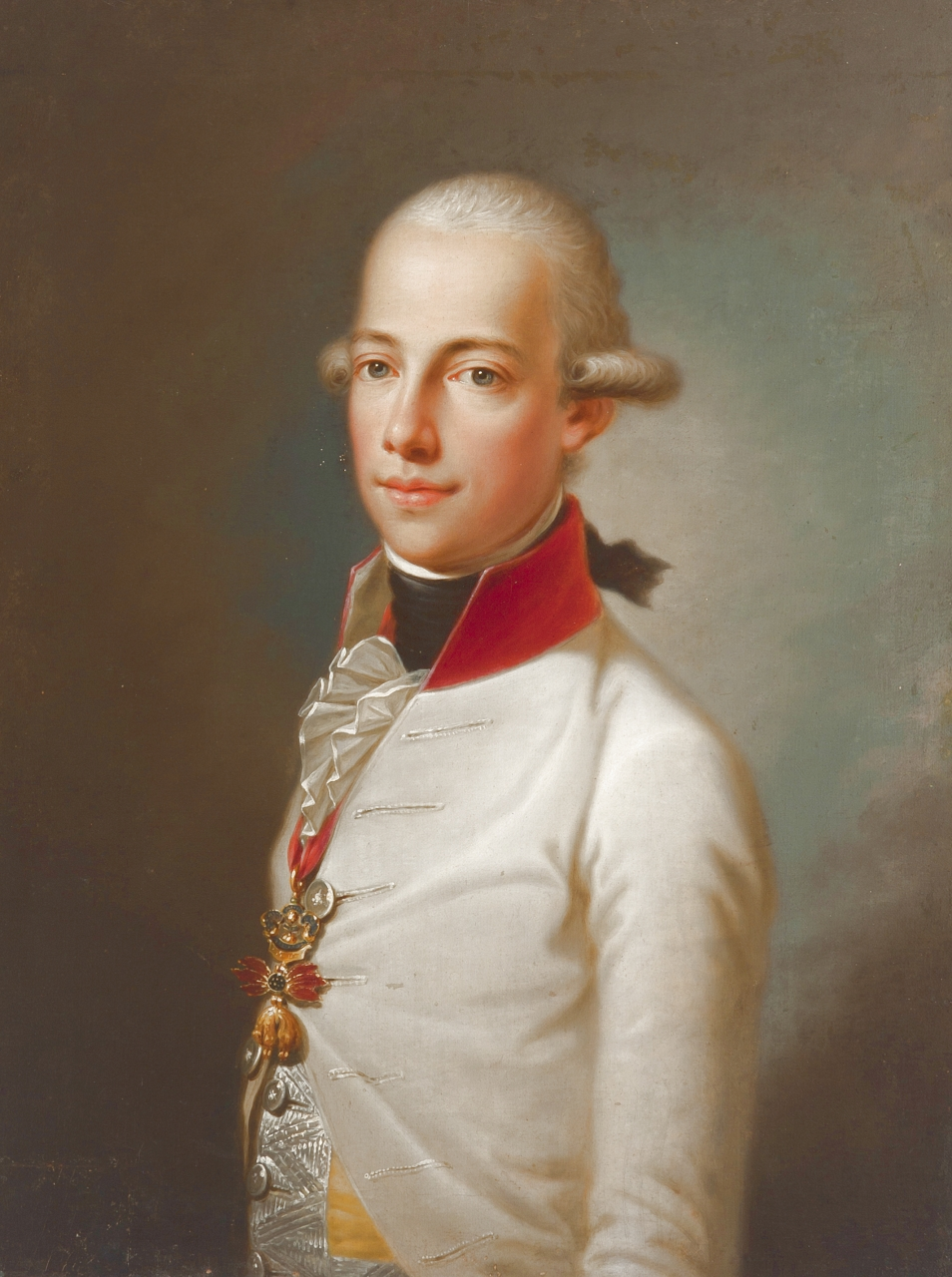
Archduke John of Austria (1782–1859) as a boy (c. 1795), the latest-born notable person to be portrayed wearing a powdered wig tied in a queue.

=== 19th and 20th centuries ===
Due to the association with ruling classes in European monarchies, the wearing of wigs as a symbol of social status was largely abandoned in the newly created republics, the United States and France, by the start of the 19th century, though formal court dress of European monarchies still required a powdered wig or long powdered hair tied in a queue until the accession of Napoleon Bonaparte (1769–1821) to the throne as emperor in 1804.

In the United States, only four presidents, from John Adams (1735–1826) to James Monroe (1758–1831), wore curly powdered wigs tied in a queue according to the old-fashioned style of the 18th century while in office, though Thomas Jefferson (1743–1826) wore a powdered wig only rarely and stopped wearing a wig entirely shortly after becoming president in 1801. John Quincy Adams (1767–1848) also wore a powdered wig in his youth, but he abandoned this fashion while serving as the U.S. Minister to Russia (1809–1814), long before his accession to the presidency in 1825, and William Henry Harrison (1773–1841) wore a powdered wig during his early military service in the U.S. Army in the 1790s. Unlike them, the first president, George Washington (1732–1799), did not wear a wig; instead, he powdered, curled and tied in a queue his own long hair.

In some parts of the countryside the wearing of wigs lasted well into the 19th century. In Saint-Gaudens in Southern France wigs were worn until the 1840s, while the German scholar Ferdinand Justi noted in his work on Hessian traditional costumes that as a child he had known an elderly farmer who wore a pigtail in the old Prussian military style. "Surely", Justi noted, "the last example of this invention of Frederick William I." In fact the Electorate of Hesse had abolished the military wig only in 1821, less than three decades earlier.

Women's wigs developed in a somewhat different way. They were worn from the 18th century onwards, although at first only surreptitiously. Full wigs in the 19th and early 20th century were not fashionable. They were often worn by old ladies who had lost their hair.

During the late nineteenth and early twentieth century hairdressers in England and France did a brisk business supplying postiches, or pre-made small wiglets, curls, and false buns to be incorporated into the hairstyle. The use of postiches did not diminish even as women's hair grew shorter in the decade between 1910 and 1920, but they seem to have gone out of fashion during the 1920s. In the 1960s a new type of synthetic wig was developed using a modacrylic fiber which made wigs more affordable. Reid-Meredith was a pioneer in the sales of these types of wigs.

Presidents of the United States in powdered wigs
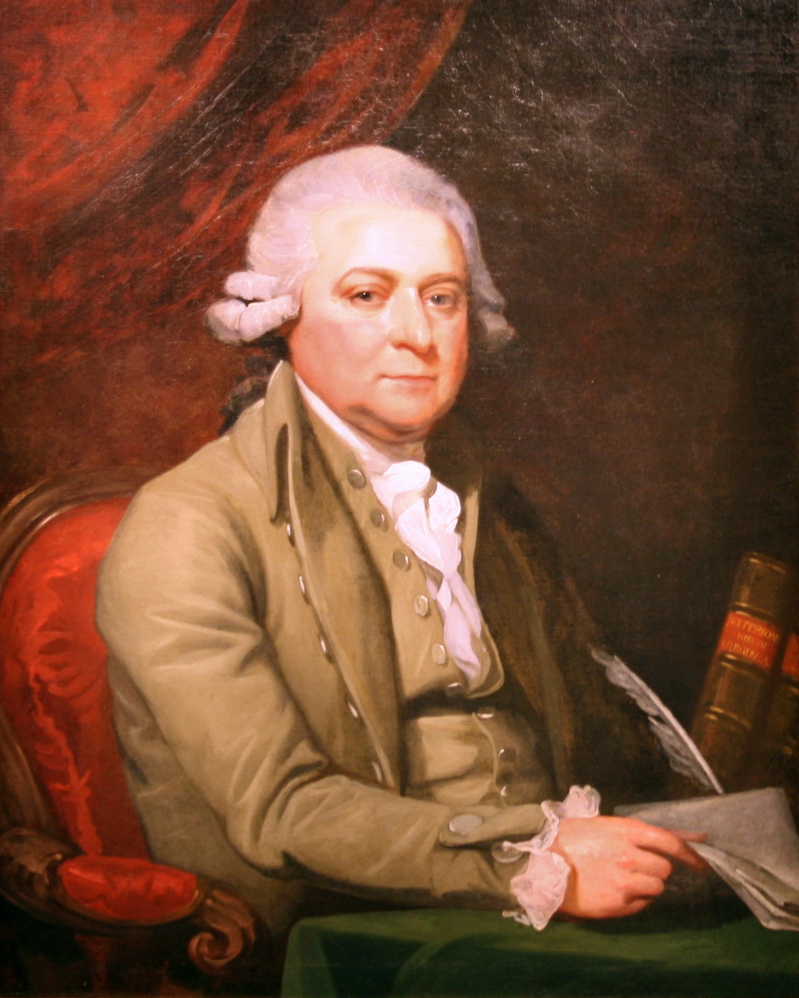
John Adams in 1788

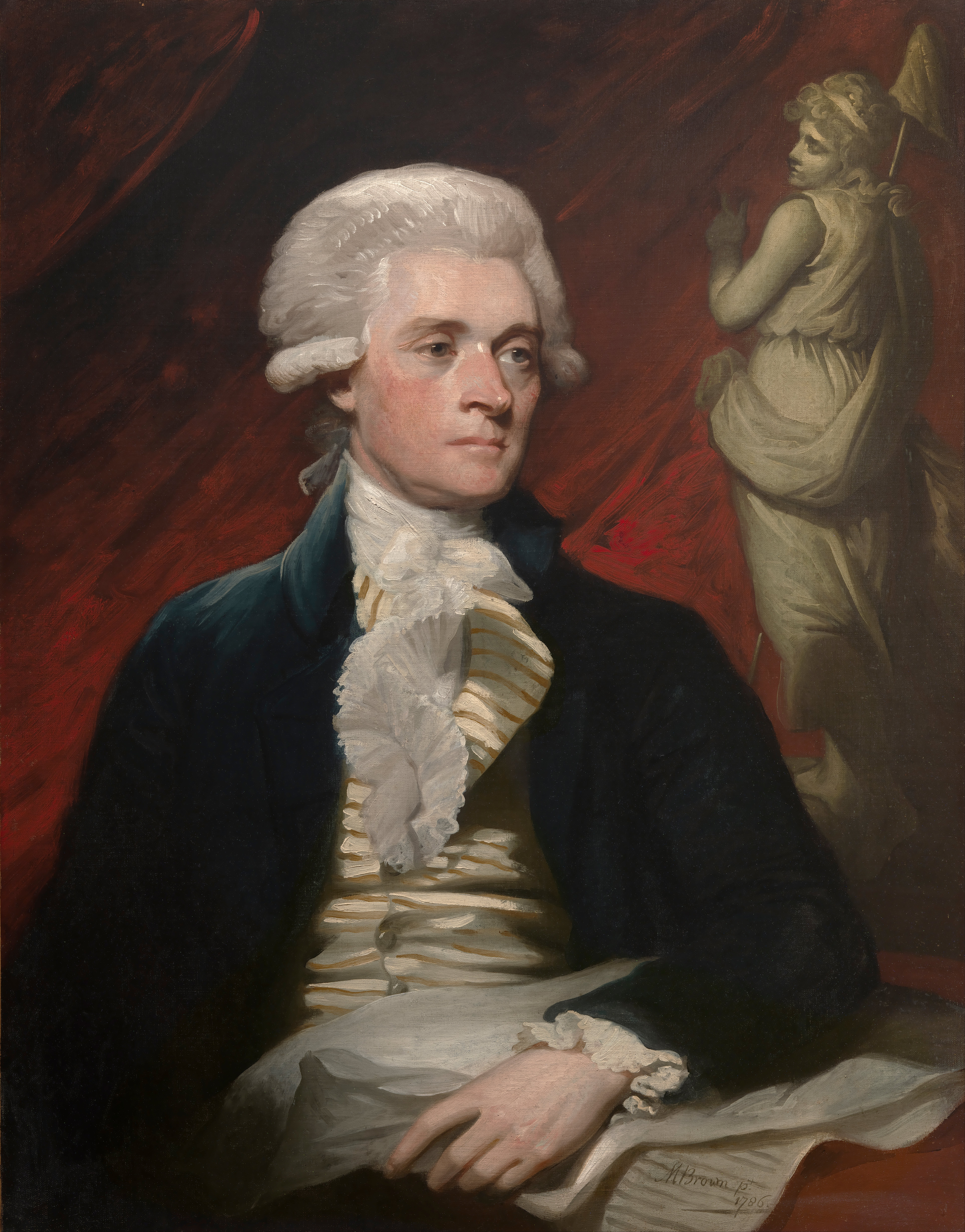
Thomas Jefferson in 1786

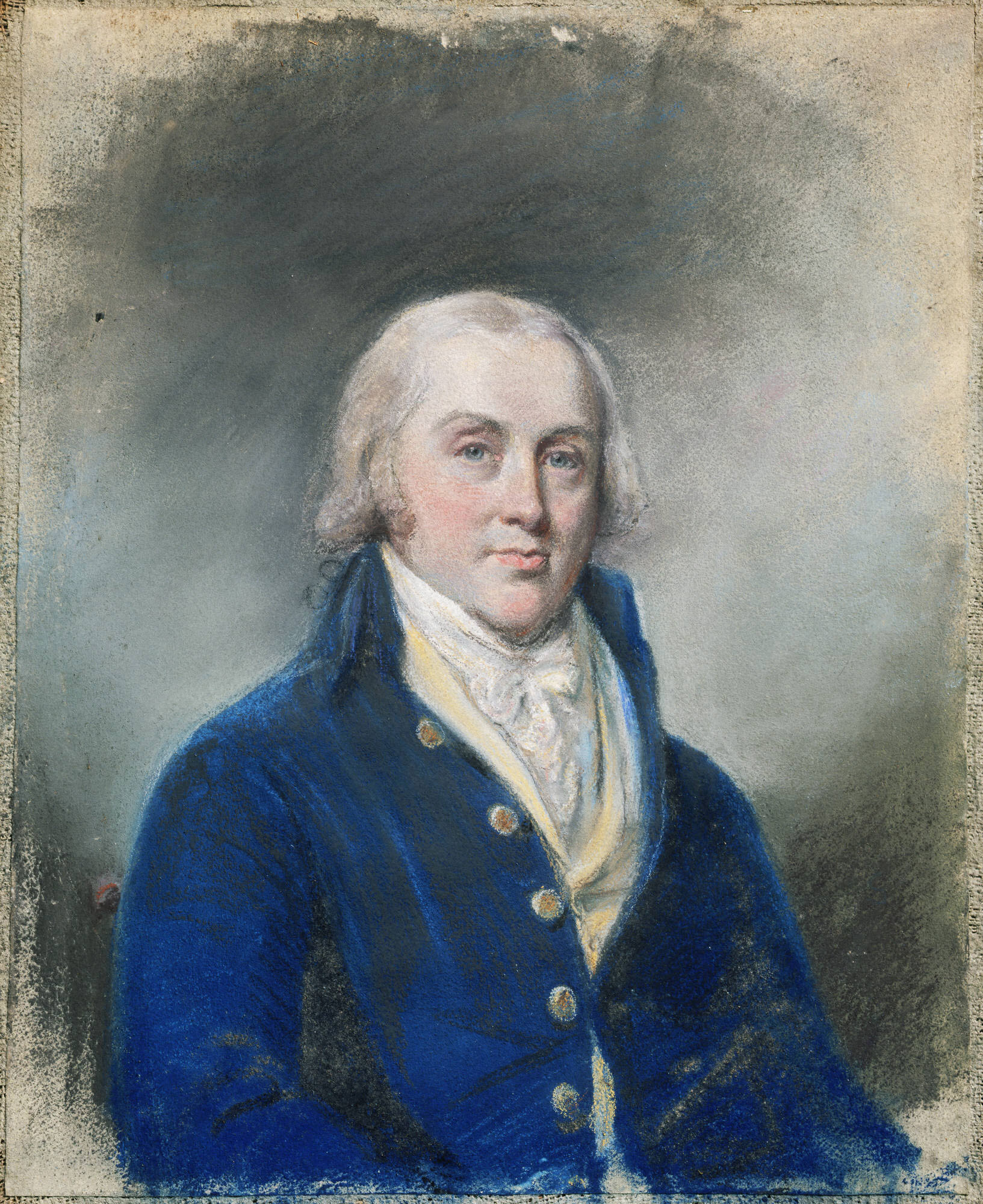
James Madison in c. 1770–1780

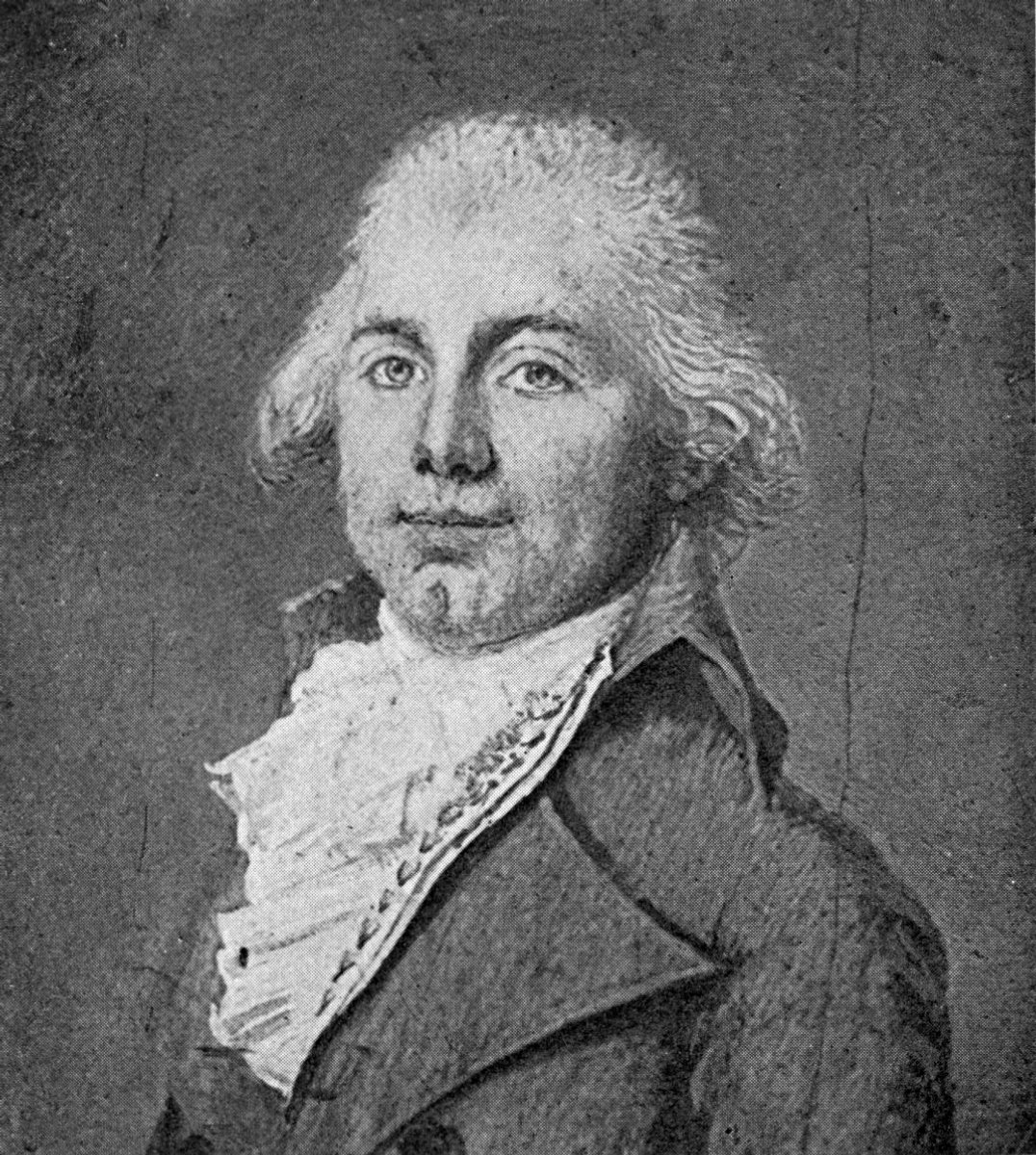
James Monroe in 1794
Change of hairstyle fashion as a part of formal court dress
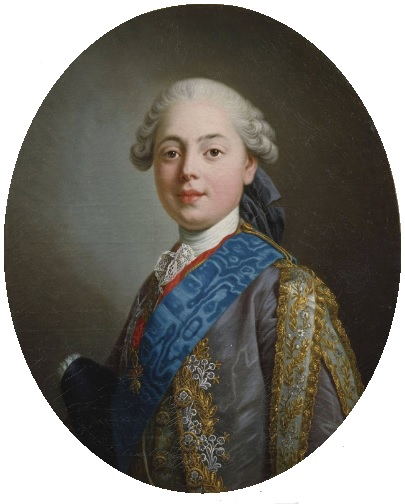
Charles X (1757–1836), the future King of France, as Count of Artois in 1771, wears a curly powdered wig tied in a queue.

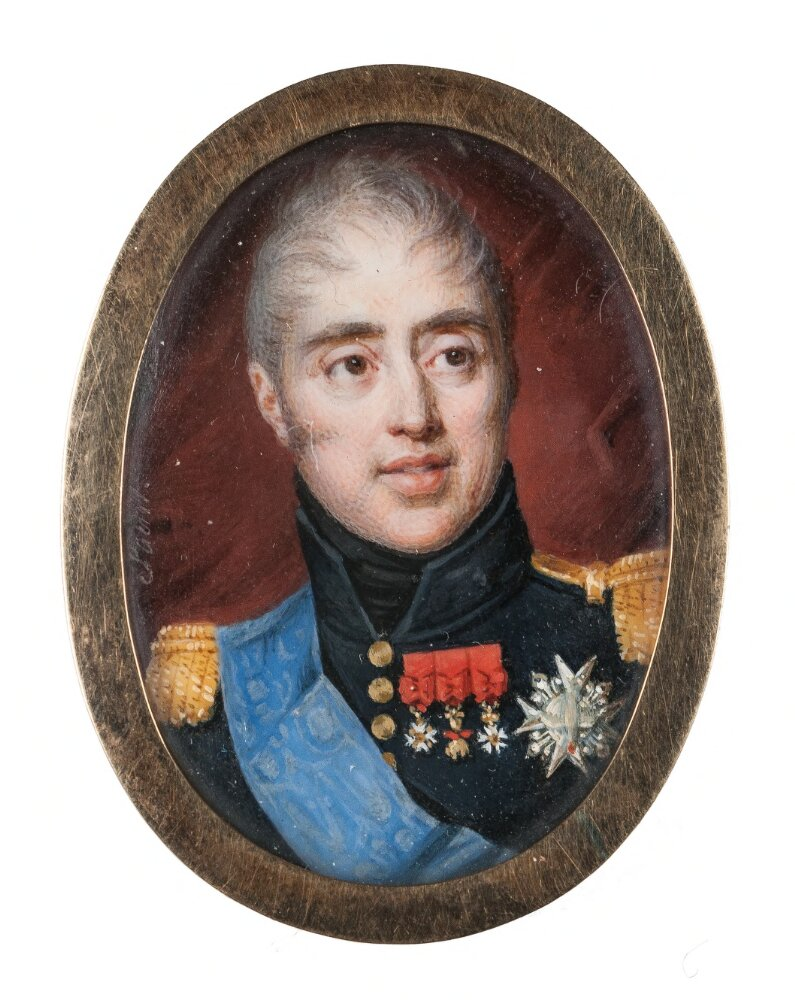
Charles X, depicted as King of France (1824–1830), wears a short unpowdered haircut.

=== 21st century ===
The art of wigs became a billion dollar industry in the 21st century. Three main processes happen within the industry: the collection of material, manufacturing, and distribution. India is the main source of hair. It has been reported from time to time that for global human hair trade, women from the ASEAN region are being exploited. Hair from this region has a significant commercial value in the international market. Particularly in India, the women are forced by their husbands into selling their hair, and slum children were being tricked into "having their heads shaved in exchange for toys". Scrap pickers are another source of hair in India, these people find hair in miscellaneous places such as hair brushes, clothes, or in the trash. While manufacturing and processing mainly takes place in China, where the hair is sorted through and constructed into wigs, the final product exported abroad, with the top countries being the United States and the United Kingdom.

==== Official use ====
In the United Kingdom and some Commonwealth nations, special wigs are also worn by barristers, judges and certain parliamentary and municipal or civic officials as a symbol of the office.

Hong Kong barristers and judges continue to wear wigs as part of court dress as a legacy of the court system from the time of British rule.

In July 2007, judges in New South Wales, Australia, voted to discontinue the wearing of wigs in the NSW Court of Appeal.

New Zealand lawyers and judges have ceased to wear wigs except for ceremonial occasions, such as when newly qualified lawyers are called to the bar.

In Ireland, lawyers and judges have ceased to wear wigs in 2011.

In Canada lawyers and judges do not wear wigs.

==== Entertainment ====
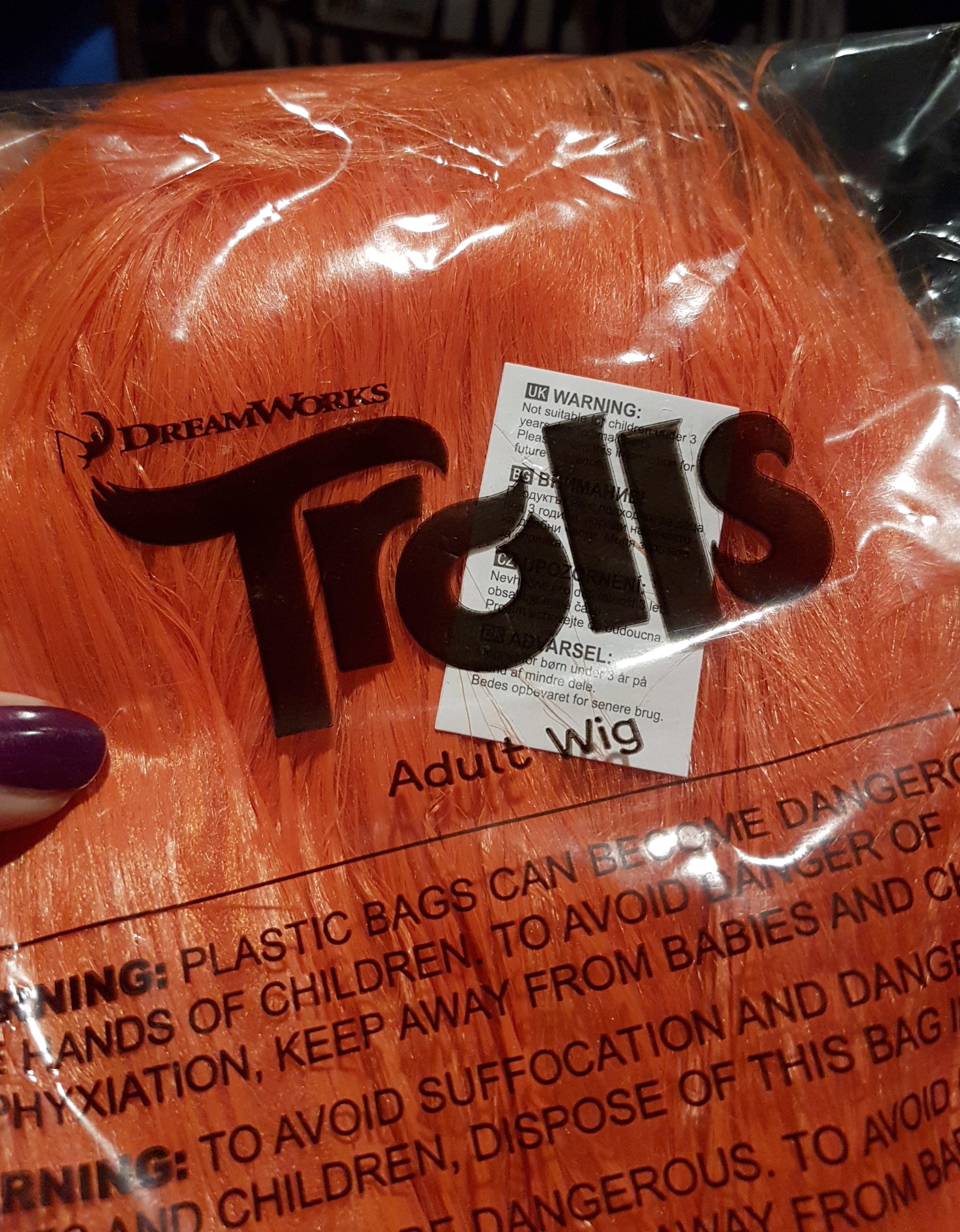
A store-bought wig to dress up as a fictional character from Trolls

A number of celebrities, including Donna Summer, Dolly Parton, Sia, Nicki Minaj, Katy Perry, Lady Gaga, Diana Ross & The Supremes, Tina Turner and Raquel Welch, popularized wigs. Cher has worn all kinds of wigs over her long career, from blonde to black, and curly to straight. They may also be worn for fun as part of fancy dress (costume wearing), when they can be of outlandish color or made from tinsel. They are quite common at Halloween, when "rubber wigs" (solid bald cap–like hats, shaped like hair), are sold at some stores. They can be used as part of a costume to dress up as a fictional character, historical character or celebrity.

Wigs are used in film, theater, and television. In the Japanese film and television genre Jidaigeki, wigs are used extensively to alter appearance to reflect the Edo period when most stories take place. Only a few actors starring in big-budgeted films and television series will grow their hair so that it may be cut to the appropriate hair style, and forgo using a wig.

In the theater, especially on Broadway, wigs are used to give a performer a fixed character. Nearly all women and many men do so not only for character design, but also to cover their microphone packs. Often the microphone pack goes on the actor's head, mainly to efficiently facilitate quick changes.

An actor not wearing a wig needs to change their look every time they go on stage. The wig helps solidify the character's design; natural hair is different day to day.

==== Convenience ====
Wigs are worn by some people on a daily or occasional basis in everyday life. This is sometimes done for reasons of convenience, since wigs can be styled ahead of time. A common practice of wigs for convenience is called protective styling. Many use wigs to avoid damage to their natural tresses, or to create styles that may not be possible otherwise. They are also worn by individuals who are experiencing hair loss for medical reasons (most commonly cancer patients who are undergoing chemotherapy, or those who are suffering from alopecia areata).

Some men who crossdress as women wear wigs in different styles to make their hair seem more feminine.

==== Merkin ====
A merkin is a pubic wig often worn as a decorative item or for theatrical and fashion purposes. They are sometimes viewed as erotic and some designs are meant for entertainment or as a form of comedy.

=== Image gallery ===
Examples of contemporary wigs
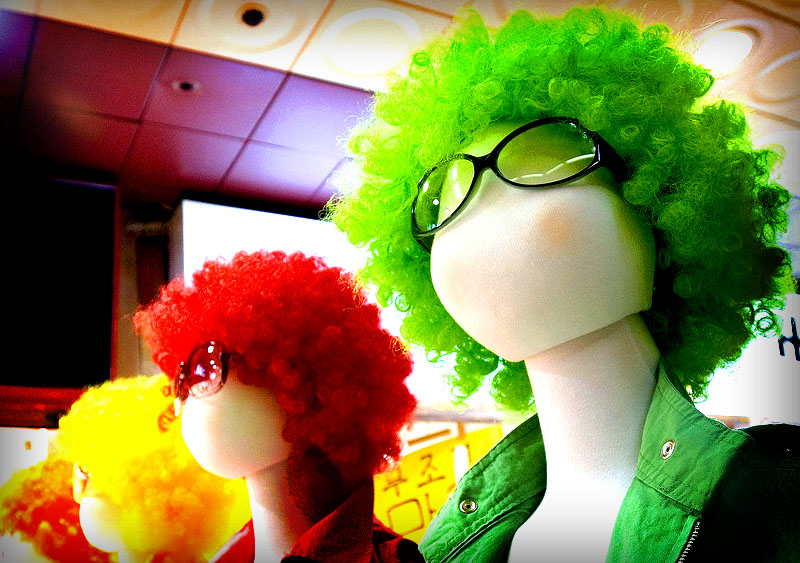
Colourful wigs for costume parties

An assortment of wigs in display cabinet

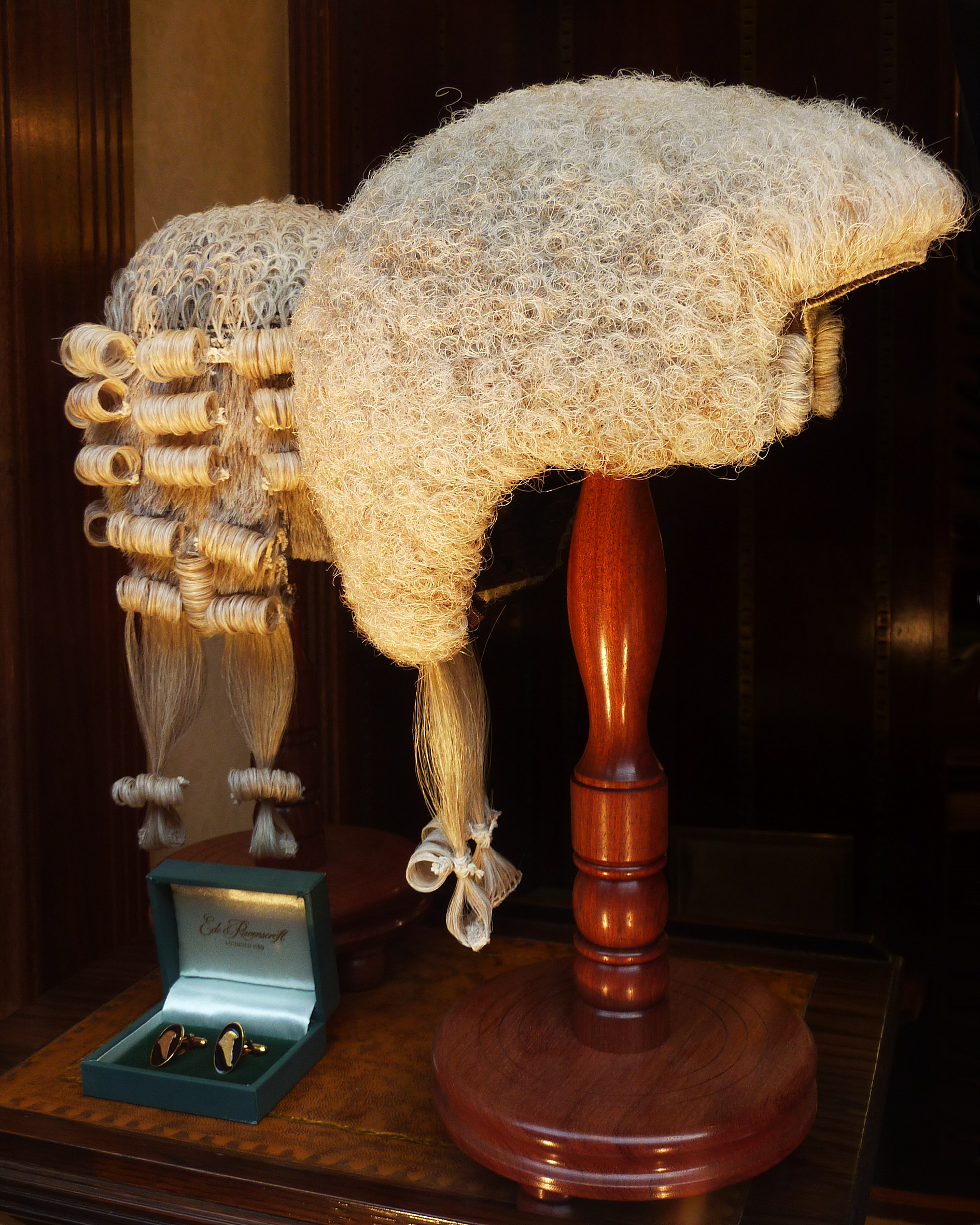
Wigs as court dress

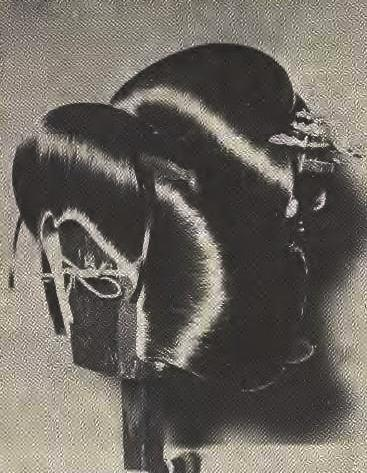
Japanese wig for traditional hairstyle

== Military wigs ==
From the late 17th to early 19th centuries, European armies wore uniforms more or less imitating the civilian fashions of the time, but with militarized additions. As part of that uniform, officers wore wigs more suited to the drawing rooms of Europe than its battlefields. The late 17th century saw officers wearing full-bottomed natural-coloured wigs, but the civilian change to shorter, powdered styles with pigtails in the early 18th century saw officers adopting similar styles. The elaborate, oversized court-styles of the late 18th century were not followed by armies in the field however, as they were impractical to withstand the rigours of military life and simpler wigs were worn.

While officers normally wore their own hair short under a powdered wig, the rank and file of the infantry was not afforded such luxury. Instead of wigs, the men grew their hair long and according to the prevailing fashion in a nation's army, hair was either allowed to grow long with simple modeling, as in the French army of the 1740s, or else was elaborately coiffured as in Prussian and British armies. In the case of British soldiers of the 1740s, contemporary artwork suggests that they cut their hair short, which was not the case. Instead, the men used tallow or other fat to grease the hair, which was then fashioned into pigtails and tied back into the scalp hair to give the impression of short hair. It was then liberally dusted with powdered chalk to give the impression of a powdered wig. Later in the century, hair was likewise tied back, greased and powdered, but false hair pigtails were adopted, kept in a tubular queue and tied back with ribbons to the soldier's own hair. The overall effect was that of a wig with a long tail and bow. The Prussian army took personal hairstyles to an extreme during the time of Frederick the Great, each soldier commonly having a long pigtail hanging down the back nearly to waist level.

By contrast, Grigory Potemkin, a Russian statesman and favourite of Catherine the Great, abhorred the tight uniforms and uncomfortable powdered wigs tied in a queue worn by soldiers of the Russian Army and instigated a complete revision of both in the 1780s. Along with comfortable, practical, well-fitting uniforms, his reforms introduced short, natural hairstyles for all, with no wigs, powder and grease, or long hair tied in a queue.

Formal military hairstyles lasted until beyond the end of the 18th century and it was the French Revolution which spelled the end of wigs and powdered, greased hairstyles in modern, Western armies. Powdered hair and pigtails made a brief return during Napoleon's reign, being worn by infantry of his Foot Grenadiers and Foot Chasseurs of the Old Guard and the Horse Grenadiers of the Guard.

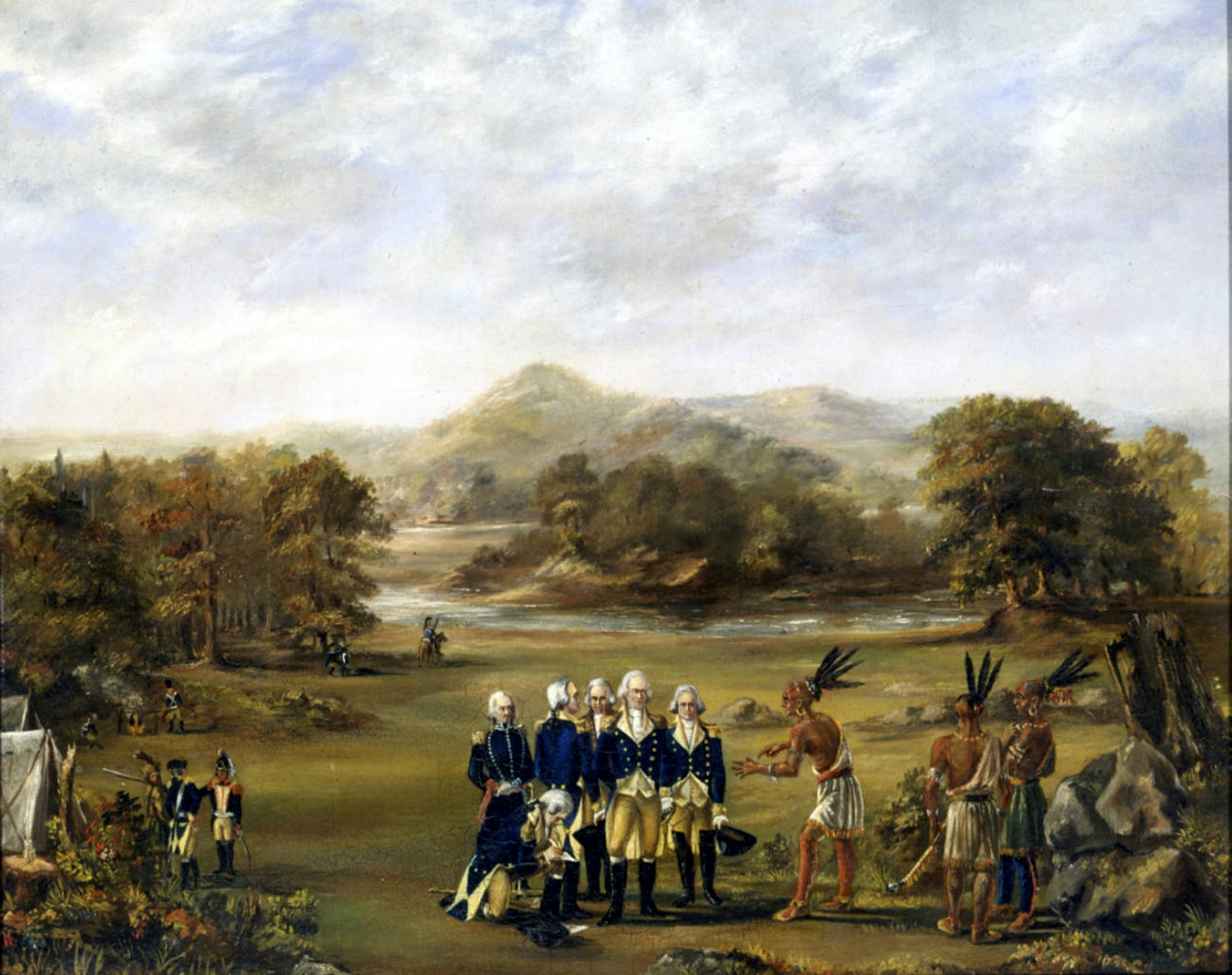
United States Army officers (future U.S.President William Henry Harrison among them) wearing powdered wigs tied in a queue during the Treaty of Greenville negotiations in 1795.

United States Army soldiers wore powdered wigs tied in a queue as a standard part of the military uniform until 1801. In 1801 James Wilkinson, a Senior Officer of the U.S. Army, issued an order to remove all queues, which had been worn in the army since the Revolutionary War (1775–1783). This order applied also to powdered wigs tied in queue and was highly unpopular with both officers and men, leading to several desertions and threats of resignation.

== Religious ==
=== Judaism ===
Jewish law requires married women to cover their hair for reasons of tzniut (Hebrew: "modesty or privacy"). Some Orthodox Jewish women wear wigs, known as sheitels, for this purpose. Wigs of those who practice Haredi Judaism and Hasidic Judaism often are made from human hair. In Modern Orthodox Judaism, women will usually wear a scarf, kerchief, snood, hat or other covering, sometimes exposing the bottom of their hair.

One rabbi has declared that long wigs are inappropriate. Another said that it is preferable for a married Jewish woman to expose her hair than to don a wig, for the wig actually increases attraction in the public domain and encourages the notion that Halakha is both irrational and intellectually dishonest. Still another rabbi, who also spoke strongly against the wearing of wigs, said specifically, "You must go with a hat or kerchief on your head", but did not permit leaving hair "exposed".

Most Orthodox women cover their hair, whether with wigs, hats or scarves. The rejection by some rabbis of wigs is not recent, but began "in the 1600s, when French women began wearing wigs to cover their hair. Rabbis rejected this practice, both because it resembled the contemporary non-Jewish style and because it was immodest, in their eyes, for a woman to sport a beautiful head of hair, even if it was a wig."

Other options include:

- wearing a covered wig, called a shpitzel
- a covering, typically cloth, called a tichel
- another non-hair (and looser) head covering, called a snood
- a short wig mostly covered by a tichel, but with (wig) "hair" showing on the forehead, sometimes also showing from the back, called a frisette

== Manufacture ==
In the 18th and 19th centuries, wigmakers were called perruquiers.

There are two methods of attaching hair to wigs. The first and oldest is to weave the root ends of the hair onto a stretch of three silk threads to form a sort of fringe called a "weft". The wefts are then sewn to a foundation made of net or other material. In modern times, the wefts can also be made (a warp is the vertical thread of a weave, the weft is the horizontal thread) with a specially adapted sewing machine, reducing the amount of hand labour involved. In the 19th century another method came into use. A small hook called a "ventilating needle" or "knotting needle", similar to the tambour hooks used for decorating fabric with chain-stitch embroidery at that period, is used to knot a few strands of hair at a time directly to a suitable foundation material. This newer method produces a lighter and more natural looking wig. High quality custom wigs, and those used for film and theatrical productions are usually done this way. It is also possible to combine the two techniques, using weft for the main part of the wig and ventilating hair at the edges and partings to give a fine finish.

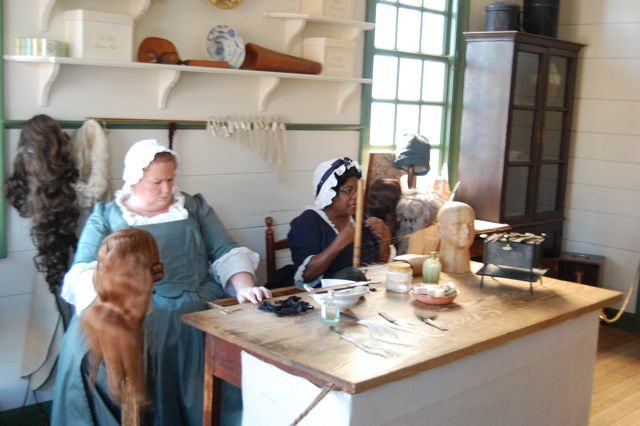
Historical reenactment of wig making in Colonial Williamsburg, Virginia

=== Measurement ===
Making custom wigs starts with measuring the subject's head. The natural hair is arranged in flat curls against the head as the various measurements are taken. It is often helpful to make a pattern from layers of transparent adhesive tape applied over a piece of plastic wrap, on which the natural hairline can be traced accurately. These measurements are then transferred to the "block", a wooden or cork-stuffed canvas form the same size and shape as the client's head.

=== Foundation ===
Depending on the style of the wig, a foundation is made of net or other material, different sizes and textures of mesh being used for different parts of the wig. The edges and other places might be trimmed and reinforced with a narrow ribbon called "galloon". Sometimes flesh colored silk or synthetic material is applied where it will show through the hair at crown and partings, and small bones or elastic are inserted to make the wig fit securely. Theatrical, and some fine custom wigs, have a fine, flesh colored net called "hair lace" at the front which is very inconspicuous in wear and allows the hair to look as if it is coming directly from the skin underneath. These are usually referred to as "lace front wigs".

=== Hair preparation ===
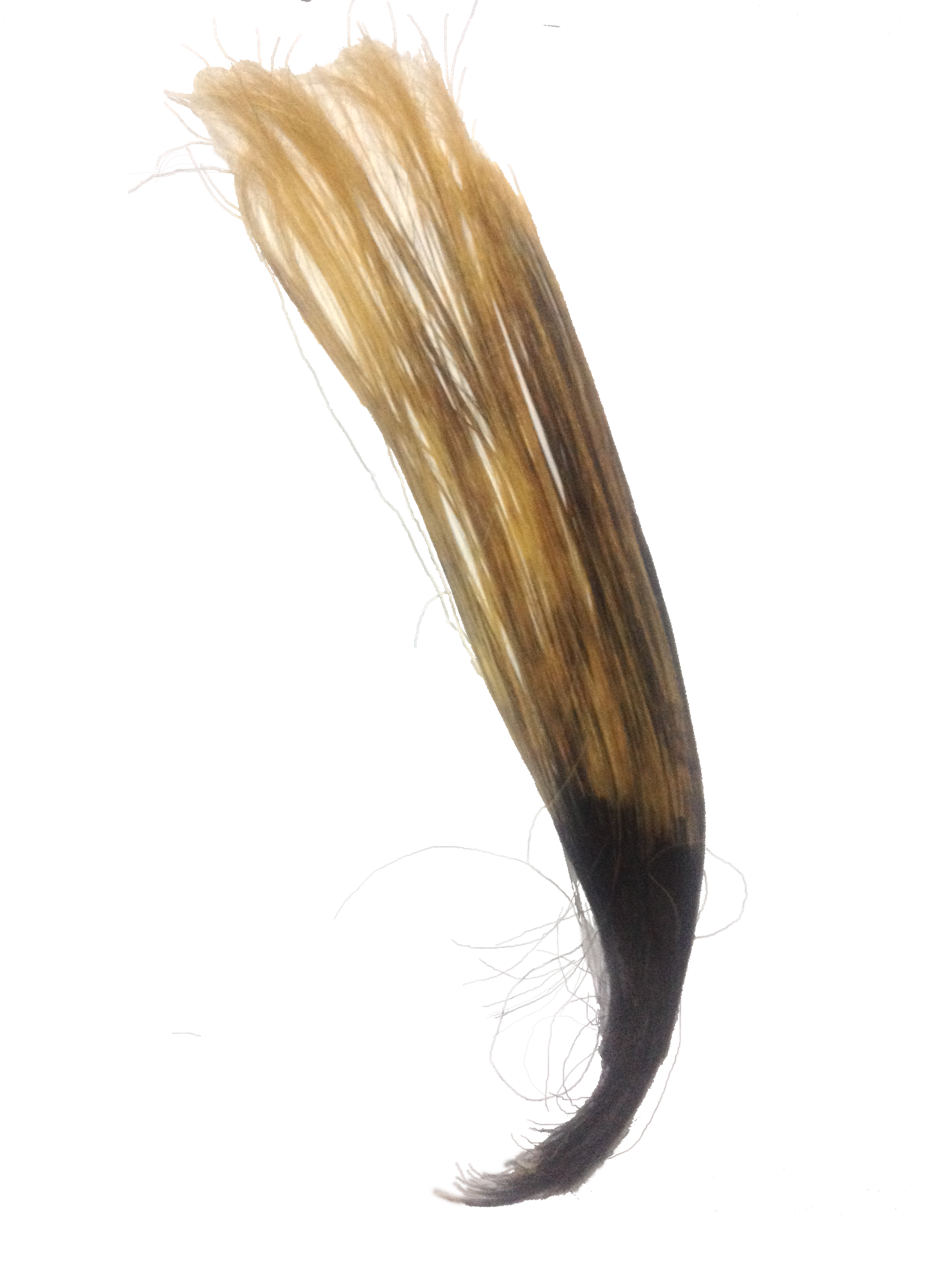
Trimmed human hair that is partly bleached

Natural hair, either human or from an animal such as a goat or yak, must be carefully sorted so that the direction of growth is maintained, root to root, and point to point. Because of the scale-like structure of the cuticle of a hair shaft, if some hairs get turned the wrong way, they will ride backwards against their neighbors and cause tangles and matting. The highest quality of hair has never been bleached or colored, and has been carefully sorted to ensure the direction is correct. This process is called "turning". For less expensive wigs, this labour-intensive sorting process is substituted by "processing" the hair. It is treated with a strong base solution which partially dissolves the cuticle leaving the strands smooth. It is then bleached and dyed to the required shade and given a synthetic resin finish which partially restores the strength and luster of the now damaged hair. Synthetic fiber, of course, is simply manufactured in the required colors, and has no direction.

The wigmaker will choose the type, length and colors of hair required by the design of the wig and blend them by pulling the hair through the upright teeth of a brush-like tool called a "hackle" which also removes tangles and any short or broken strands. The hair is placed on one of a pair of short-bristled brushes called "drawing brushes" with the root ends extending over one edge; the edge facing the wigmaker (or properly called, boardworker), and the second brush is pressed down on top of it so that a few strands can be withdrawn at a time, leaving the rest undisturbed.

=== Adding the hair ===
Weft structured wigs can have the wefts sewn to the foundation by hand, while it is on the block or, as is common with mass-produced wigs, sewn to a ready-made base by skilled sewing machine operators. Ventilated (hand knotted) wigs have the hair knotted directly to the foundation, a few strands at a time while the foundation is fastened to the block. With the hair folded over the finger, the wigmaker pulls a loop of hair under the mesh, and then moves the hook forward to catch both sides of the loop. The ends are pulled through the loop and the knot is tightened for a "single knot", or a second loop is pulled through the first before finishing for a "double knot". Typically, the bulkier but more secure double knot is used over the majority of the wig and the less obvious single knot at the edges and parting areas. A skilled wigmaker will consider the number of strands of hair used and the direction of each knot to give the most natural effect possible.

It takes generally six heads of hair to make a full human hair wig.

=== Styling ===
At this point, the hair on the wig is all the same length. The wig must be styled into the desired form in much the same manner as a regular stylist.

=== Fitting ===
The subject's natural hair is again knotted tightly against the head and the wig is applied. Any remaining superfluous wiglace is trimmed away. Hairpins can be used to secure the lace to the hair and occasionally, skin-safe adhesives are used to adhere the wig against bald skin and to better hide any exposed lace. Finishing touches are done to the hair styling to achieve the desired effect.

=== Types of human hair wigs ===
There are two basic kinds of hair wigs: The traditional machine stitched weft wig and the hand tied lace wig. The machine stitched wigs are still the most widely worn wigs today. The hair is sewn on a stretch weft material and come with back straps for adjusting to various head sizes. These wigs are typically pre-styled and lack any kind of realistic expectations.

Lace wigs are quickly becoming one of the most sought-after wigs among wig wearers. The illusion of hair growing from the scalp is the feature that makes this wig the best of the best when it comes to wearing fake hair. These wigs are made with a French or Swiss lace material base. They are made as a full lace or partial lace front with a stretch weft back. Each hair strand is individually stitched into a lace material which creates the natural look of hair at the base. This is where the term "hand tied" originates.

Hair type is the distinguishing factor in human hair wigs. Four main types of hair are used in manufacturing: Chinese or "Malaysian", Indian, Indonesian or "Brazilian", and Caucasian or "European". The majority of human hair wigs are made of Chinese or Indian hair, while European hair is considered the most expensive and rare, as most donors are from Russia or Northern Europe, where there is a smaller portion of hair donors to the market.

Remy human hair is considered to be the best quality of human hair because the cuticles are kept intact and not stripped away; "strands retain their scaled natural outer cuticle." The preserved cuticles are also aligned in a unidirectional manner, which decreases tangling and matting. Also, the hair is carefully separated after collecting from the donor to ensure all the cuticles are of the same length.

== Notable wig designers ==
- Willy Clarkson, who created wigs for London's West End theatre productions
- Peter King, Bristol, United Kingdom
- Nina Lawson, who ran the Metropolitan Opera wig department from 1956 to 1987
- Peter Owen, Bristol, United Kingdom

== See also ==
- Hair extensions
- Hair prosthesis
- Toupée
