= Head covering for Jewish women =

Wig or half-wig worn by some married Orthodox Jewish women

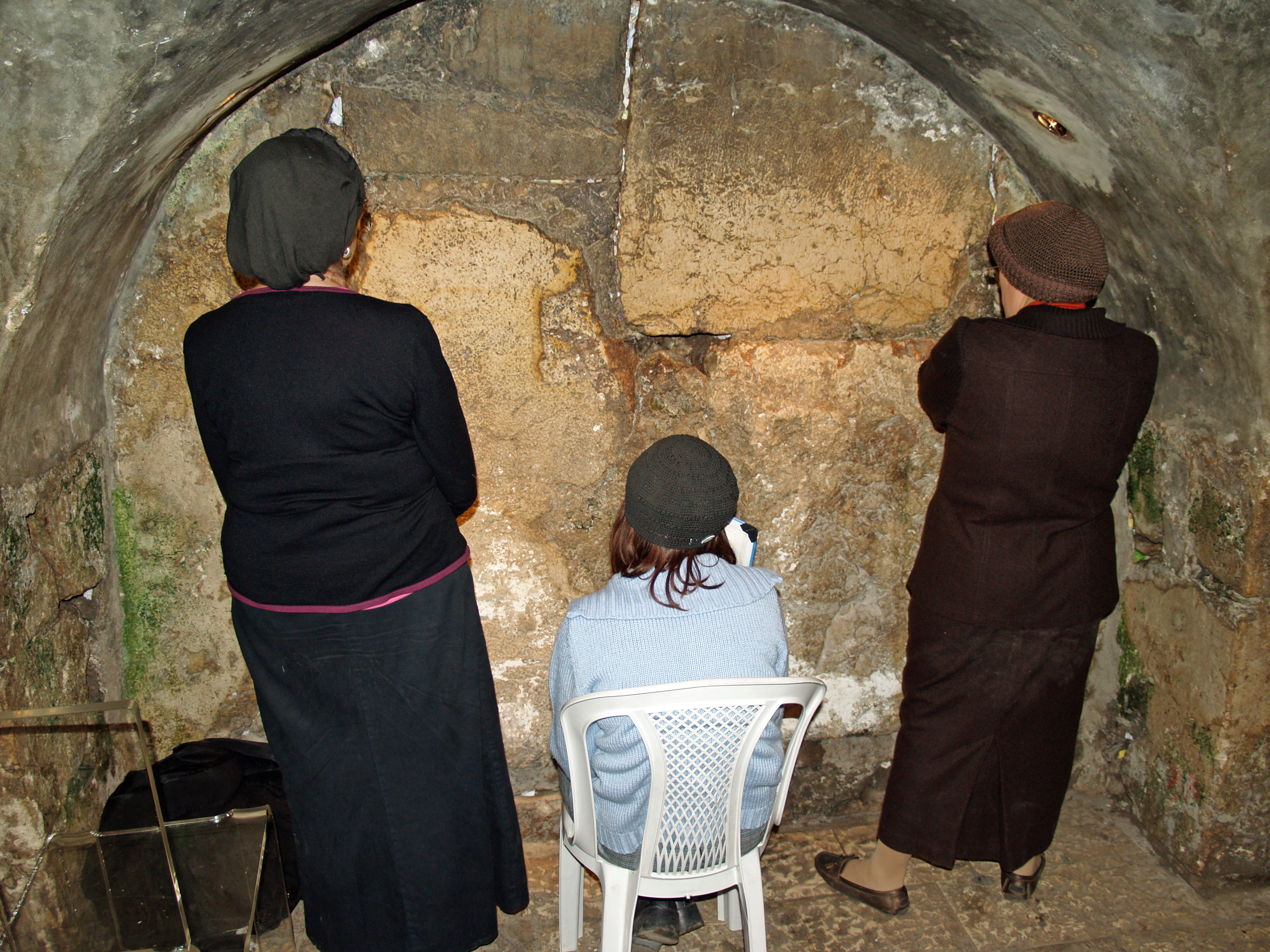
Three styles of hair covering common among married Orthodox Jewish women. From left to right: snood, fall, and hat

According to halacha (Jewish religious law), married Orthodox Jewish women are expected to cover their hair when in the presence of men other than their husband or close family members. Such covering is common practice among Orthodox Jewish women. This is called kisui rosh (Hebrew: כיסוי ראש). Most Jews are not Orthodox and do not cover their hair. The practice is often compared to the Islamic concept of hijab, also generally interpreted as requiring the covering of the hair.

Different kinds of hair coverings are used, among them the headscarf (Hebrew: מטפחת, romanized: mitpachat; Yiddish: טיכל, romanized: tichel), snood, hat, and wig (Yiddish: שייטל, romanized: sheitel), each with many variations. The headscarf and snood remain the historic and universally accepted rabbinical standard for observant Jewish women. The headscarves can be tied in a number of ways, depending on how casually the wearer is dressed.

Covering the hair is part of the modesty-related dress standard called tzniut. The hair is considered a body part that should only be seen by one's husband.

== Laws ==
According to Jewish religious law (halacha), a woman must cover her hair after marriage. The requirement applies in the presence of any men other than her husband, son, father, grandson, grandfather, or brother. The obligation to cover hair applies in public areas, though a minority opinion allows uncovering hair within one's home even in the presence of unrelated men.

The consensus is that all or most of the hair must be covered. Some sources rule that every single hair must be covered, but many others permit a small amount of hair (each source defines the amount differently) to emerge from the head-covering.

Various reasons have been suggested for this head-covering, among them:

- Historically, head-covering was considered a form of dignity for a woman, and to have one's head-covering removed was a source of humiliation.
- Married women are expected to behave with a higher level of sexual modesty than single women, due to the commitment they have made to their husbands, and covering their potentially alluring hair is one aspect of this.
- Head covering is a sign of a woman's married status, which (among other things) could indicate to men that she is unavailable to them.
- Head-covering indicates awe when standing before God, similar to the kippah for men.
- Nowadays, head-covering also serves a sign of identification with the religious Jewish community.

=== Sources ===
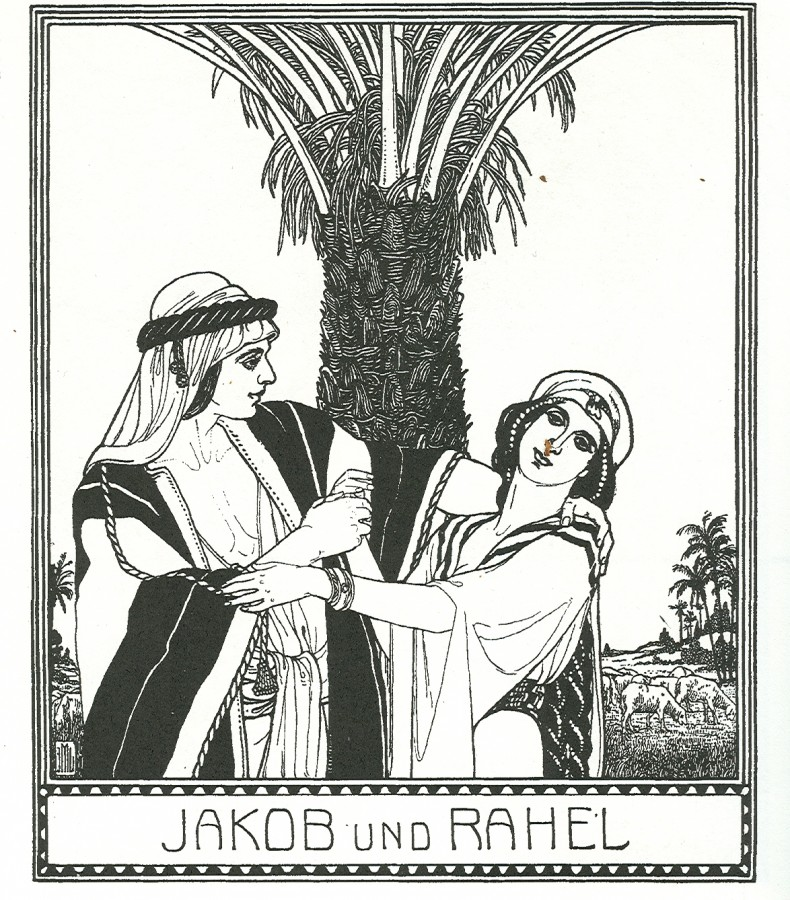
Rahel (right) with her head covered by a scarf

Numbers 5:18 requires, as part of the sotah ritual, that a married woman's head be made parua (a word which has been understood to mean 'uncovered' or 'with loose hair'), suggesting that, normally, her hair is not parua. According to the Talmud, this indicates that the Torah prohibits married women in general from appearing parua in public.

The Mishnah, however, implies that hair covering is not an obligation of biblical origin. It discusses behaviors that are grounds for divorce, such as, "appearing in public with a parua head, weaving in the marketplace, and talking to any man", and calls these violations of Dat Yehudit (Note: Mishnaic manuscripts read דת יהודים, 'Law of the Jews', but printings, following most Bavli manuscripts, read דת יהודית, 'Jewish Law'. Cf. דת ישראל in t. Ketubot 7:6.) ('Jewish law') as opposed to Dat Moshe ('Mosaic law'). The Talmud reconciles the sources by saying that if her head is completely uncovered in public, this would be a violation of Dat Moshe, whereas a woman who appears in public wearing a kalta (a minimal covering of part of the hair, perhaps a basket resting on the head) has satisfied Dat Moshe but is still violating Dat Yehudit.

Another relevant Talmudic source is Berakhot 24a, where the rabbis define hair as sexually erotic (ervah), and prohibit men from praying in sight of a married woman's hair. The rabbis base this judgement on a biblical verse: "Your hair is like a flock of goats" (Song of Songs 4:1), suggesting that this praise reflects the sensual nature of hair. However, "with a few exceptions, there is halachic consensus that the obligation of women's head-covering derives chiefly from the sota and, secondarily, from dat Yehudit", rather than from ervah, and a number of leading poskim ruled that while head-covering is required, in societies where this law is widely ignored, the uncovered hair ceases to be considered ervah for the purpose of prayer.

The Zohar, a commentary on the Hebrew Scriptures and the primary source of the beliefs of Kabbalah, also describes the mystical importance of women making sure to not expose their hair. The parashat Naso 125b–126b suggests that a woman who strictly obeys head covering traditions will reap many blessings for her husband and children.

=== Unmarried women ===
The medieval codes do not mention any exemption for unmarried women. According to the Mishna, if a woman went to her wedding with hair uncovered, this serves as proof that she was a maiden, a virgin (i. e., never before married) at the time. This seems to indicate that never-married women did not cover their hair, but divorced and widowed women did continue to cover their hair. This is also the position taken by the Jerusalem Talmud and is generally the accepted ruling today. However, R' Moshe Feinstein permitted divorced and widowed women to uncover their hair in cases of great need, for example, when a head covering might interfere with dating or obtaining a job. Exact rulings in such cases vary depending on the community and the individual's situation.

In Yemen, unmarried girls covered their hair like their Muslim peers; however, upon Yemeni Jews' emigration to Israel and other places, this custom has been abandoned. Aharon Roth praised this custom. Magen Avraham ruled that while unmarried women need not cover their hair, they must braid it so that it is not disheveled. This ruling is practiced in some Hasidic communities nowadays.

When a woman gets married, opinions differ regarding when exactly she must begin covering her head: after betrothal (rare today), after the chuppah ceremony, after yichud, or only after the couple has spent a night together. Even according to the more stringent opinions, the bridal veil (which partly covers the hair) may be considered sufficient cover for the remainder of the ceremony.

=== Non-Orthodox Judaism ===
Conservative and Reform Judaism do not generally require women to wear head coverings. Some more traditional Conservative synagogues may ask that married women cover their heads during services. However, some more liberal Conservative synagogues suggest that women, married or not, wear head-coverings similar to those worn by men (the kippah/yarmulke); and some require it (or require it only for women receiving honors or leading services from the bimah) – not for modesty, but as a feminist gesture of egalitarianism.

In the 21st century, some non-Orthodox Jewish women began covering their heads or hair with scarves, kippot, or headbands. Reasons given for doing so included as an act of spiritual devotion, as expression of ethnic identity, as an act of resistance to a culture that normalizes the exposure of the body, or as a feminist reclamation of modest dress, a practice sometimes seen as non- or anti-feminist.

== Scarves ==
=== Mitpachat ===
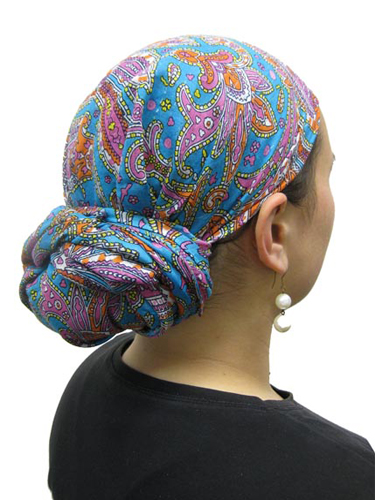
Knotted tichel

Mitpachat (Hebrew: מִטְפַּחַת, romanized: miṭpaḥat), also called a tichel (Yiddish: טיכל, romanized: tikhl), is the headscarf worn covering the hair. Mitpaḥot can range from a plain scarf of any material worn over the hair to elaborate head coverings using multiple fabrics and tying techniques.

According to Ibn Ezra, already in Biblical times, Israelite women wore a form of cloth head covering similar to that worn by Muslim women in his own time (12th century).

A padded cap called a shaper, volumizer, or bobo, is sometimes worn under a scarf to create a more desirable shape.

==== Etymology ====
The word mitpaḥat is a Hebrew word which literally means a covering or mantle, though is also used to mean many other things such as towel, apron, bandage, or wrap. Its current meaning is taken from post-biblical Hebrew, and is most likely derived from the Hebrew word טִפַּח (tipaḥ), meaning spread out or extended.

The Yiddish word tichel is the diminutive of tuch ("cloth"). Compare German Tuch ("cloth"), and the corresponding Bavarian diminutive Tiachal, Tücherl ("small piece of cloth").

=== Shal ===
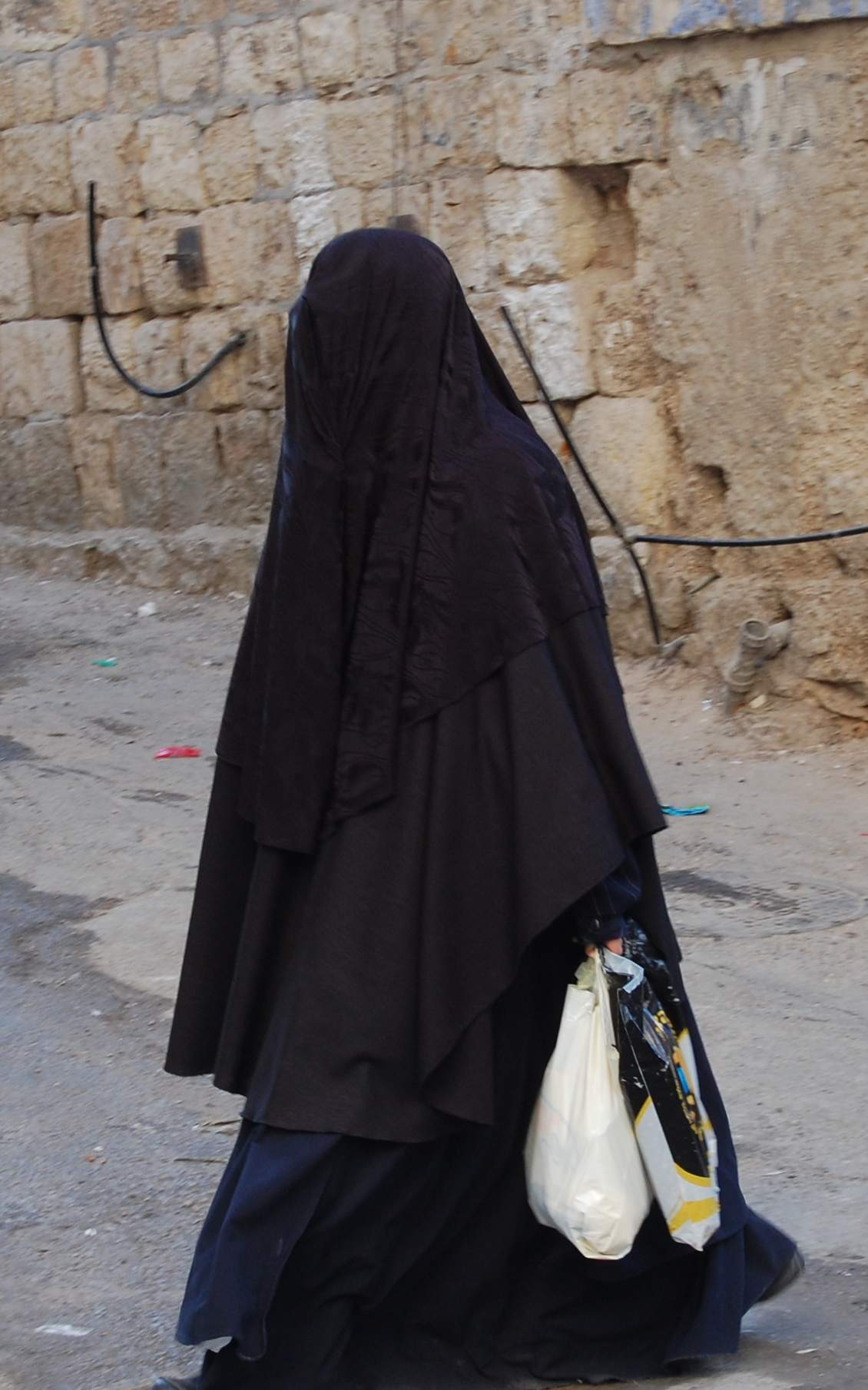
Woman of the Neshot haShalim in Mea Shearim, a Jewish neighbourhood in the Old City of Jerusalem, 2012

The shal (Hebrew: שָאל, romanized: shāl, lit. 'shawl')—also called a frumka, a portmanteau of the Yiddish-language word frum and the Arabic-language word burqa—is a garment which fully covers the body and face. It has been associated with Israeli fundamentalist groups such as the Neshot haShalim and Lev Tahor, making it highly controversial. Proponents of the shal have been pejoratively referred to as “Taliban mothers” or the “Taliban sect” whose practices are an innovation that has “no basis whatsoever in halachah.”

However, face veils have been worn historically by Jewish women. Marc B. Shapiro has written that there are some traditional sources which describe and praise the custom of modest Jewish women covering their faces, including the Babylonian Talmud, Jerusalem Talmud, Mishnah, and Mishneh Torah. Jewish women in the Islamic world maintained this type of traditional clothing “until even the mid-20th century,” since “Jews dressed in the style of the surrounding society” and therefore continued to wear garments typically regarded as “Islamic dress,” such as the chador, niqab, and burqa.

== Wigs ==
=== Sheitel ===
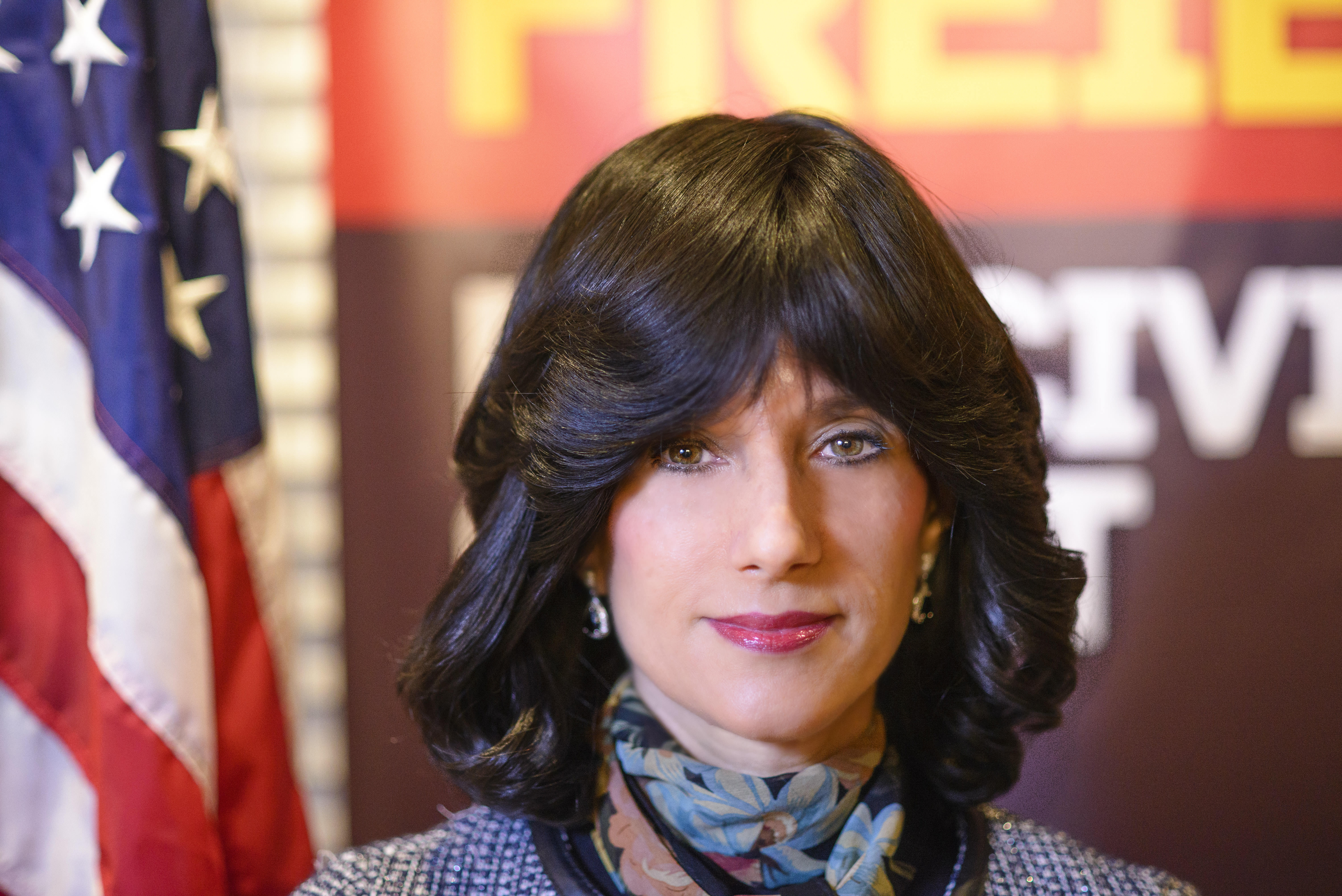
Judge Rachel Freier, a married Hasidic woman, wearing a sheitel

Sheitel (Yiddish: שייטל, romanized: sheytl SG; שייטלעך, sheytlekh or שייטלען, sheytlen PL) is a wig or half-wig. The related term in Hebrew is pei'ah (פאה) or pei'ah nochrit (פאה נוכרית). The Sheitel started to be used by some Jewish women as a headcovering in the 18th century, though its use has been opposed by traditional rabbis.

Traditional sheitels are secured by elastic caps, and are often designed with heavy bangs to obscure the hairline of their wearers. More modern lace-front wigs with realistic hairlines or real hair are growing in popularity.

Some modern Orthodox women cover their hair with wigs. A style of half wig known as a fall has become increasingly common in some segments of Modern and Haredi Orthodox communities. It is worn with either a hat or a headband.

=== Shpitzel ===
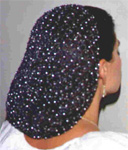
A Jewish woman wearing a sheitel with a shpitzel or snood on top of it

A shpitzel (Yiddish: שפּיצל) is a head covering worn by some married Hasidic women. It is a partial wig that only has hair in the front, the rest typically covered by a small pillbox hat or a headscarf. The hairpiece may actually be silk or lace, or else made of synthetic fibers, to avoid too closely resembling real hair. The shpitzel was popular among Hungarian Hasidim in the 19th century, and it is worn by some contemporary women who follow the customs of that community.

==== Etymology ====
The Yiddish word "Shpitzel" is related to the grammatical diminutive of the high-German word "Spitze" which can either mean "point" or "lace"; the latter translation is most likely the right one in the context of this article.

=== Acceptability ===
The practice of covering hair with wigs is debated among halakhic authorities. Many authorities, including Rabbi Moshe Feinstein, permitted it, and the Lubavitcher Rebbe actively encouraged it, while many other authorities, especially Sephardi rabbis, forbid it. Some Hasidic groups encourage sheitels, while others avoid them. In many Hasidic groups, sheitels are avoided, as they can give the impression that the wearer's head is uncovered. In other Hasidic groups, women wear some type of covering over the sheitel to avoid this misconception, for example a scarf or a hat. Married Sephardi and National Religious women do not wear wigs, because their rabbis believe that wigs are insufficiently modest, and that other head coverings, such as a scarf (tichel), a snood, a beret, or a hat, are more suitable. In stark contrast, the Chabad rebbe, Menachem Mendel Schneerson, encouraged all married Jewish women to wear sheitels, though in Torat Menachem, he writes that in fact, "if she can cover her hair with a scarf, it is definitely good if she would do so, but in reality, we know that this doesn't happen."

Some debate exists within Jewish communities regarding the permissibility of wearing a sheitel (wig) that closely resembles a woman's natural hair, particularly when the wig is perceived to be more aesthetically appealing than her uncovered hair. Critics argue that such wigs may undermine the intended modesty associated with hair covering. However, many rabbinic authorities maintain that the primary purpose of hair covering in Jewish law (halakha) is not necessarily to diminish a woman's attractiveness, but rather to fulfill the religious requirement of concealing her natural hair from public view after marriage. This view holds that modesty is achieved through the act of covering, regardless of the appearance or style of the covering itself.

In 2004, controversy arose over natural hair sheitels procured from India when Rabbi Elyashiv announced a prohibition on the use of Indian hair in Jewish wigs. It was discovered that the hair used for the production of these wigs was taken from a Hindu temple where pilgrims travelled to undergo the ritual of tonsure (head shaving). According to Jewish law, one cannot derive benefit from anything used in practices considered to be idolatry. Subsequently, women in Satmar Brooklyn burned their wigs following the prohibition. Another effort to prohibit the use of tonsured Indian hair made news in 2017. Among the alternatives wigmakers pursued was sourcing hair from Cambodia.

Today, many wigs used by Jewish women come with a hechsher (kosher certification), indicating that they are not made with hair originating from rituals deemed to be idolatrous. Kosher certification also implies that the sheitels are recognizable as wigs, no longer than the top vertebra of the spinal cord, and appear neat and modest.

== Gargush ==
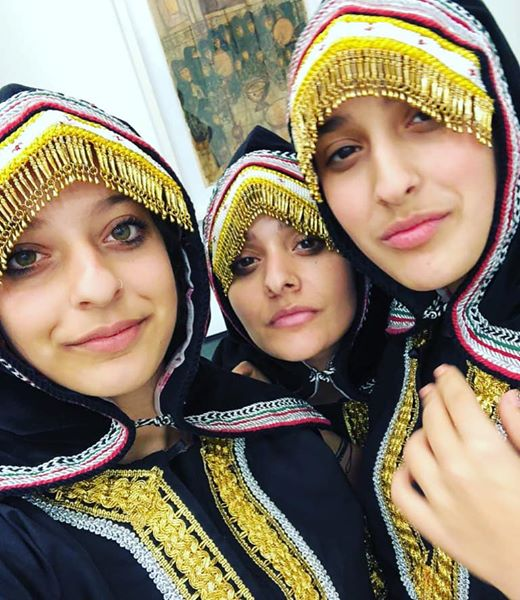
Yemenite Jewish girls wearing gargush caps

Women in the Jewish community in Yemen traditionally wore a specific type of headdress called a gargush (Hebrew: קרקוש).

== Gallery ==
Types of Jewish women's headcoverings

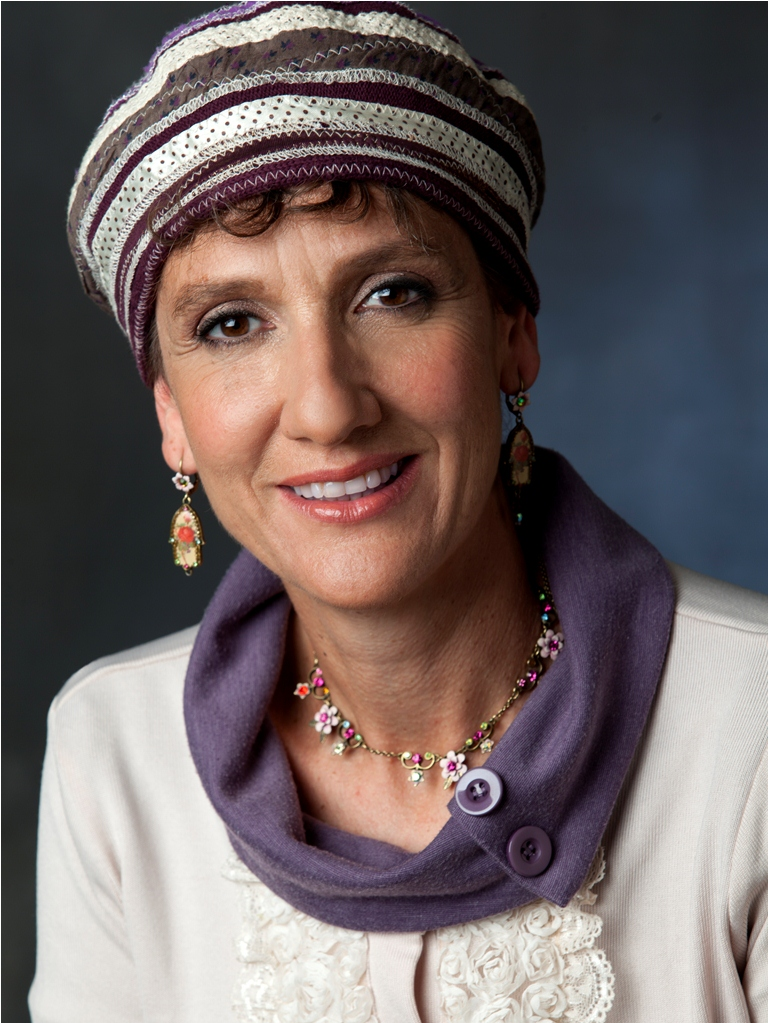
Shuli Mualem, an Israeli politician, wearing a cap

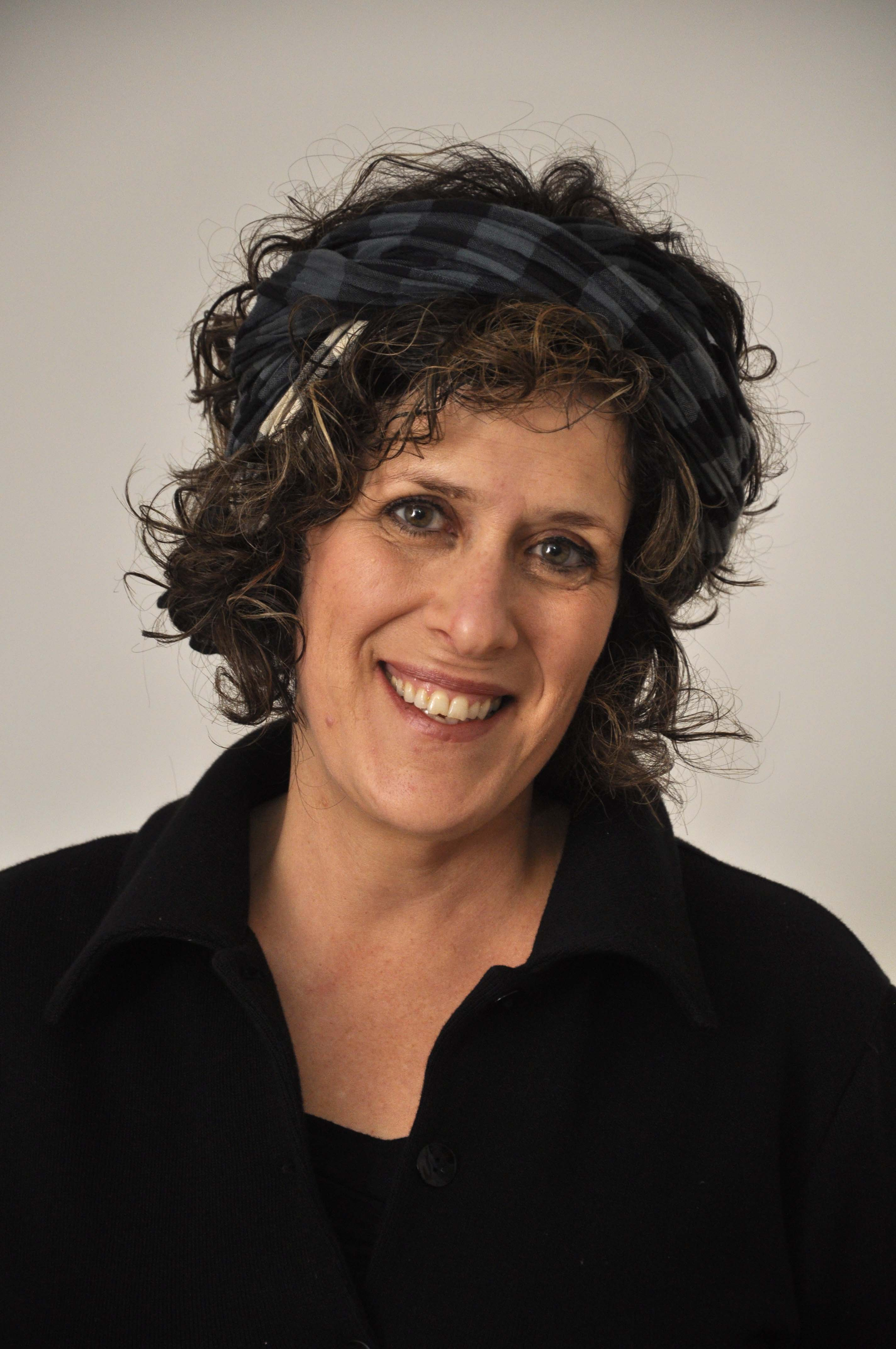
Politician Batya Kahana Dror wearing a headscarf that does not cover all of her hair

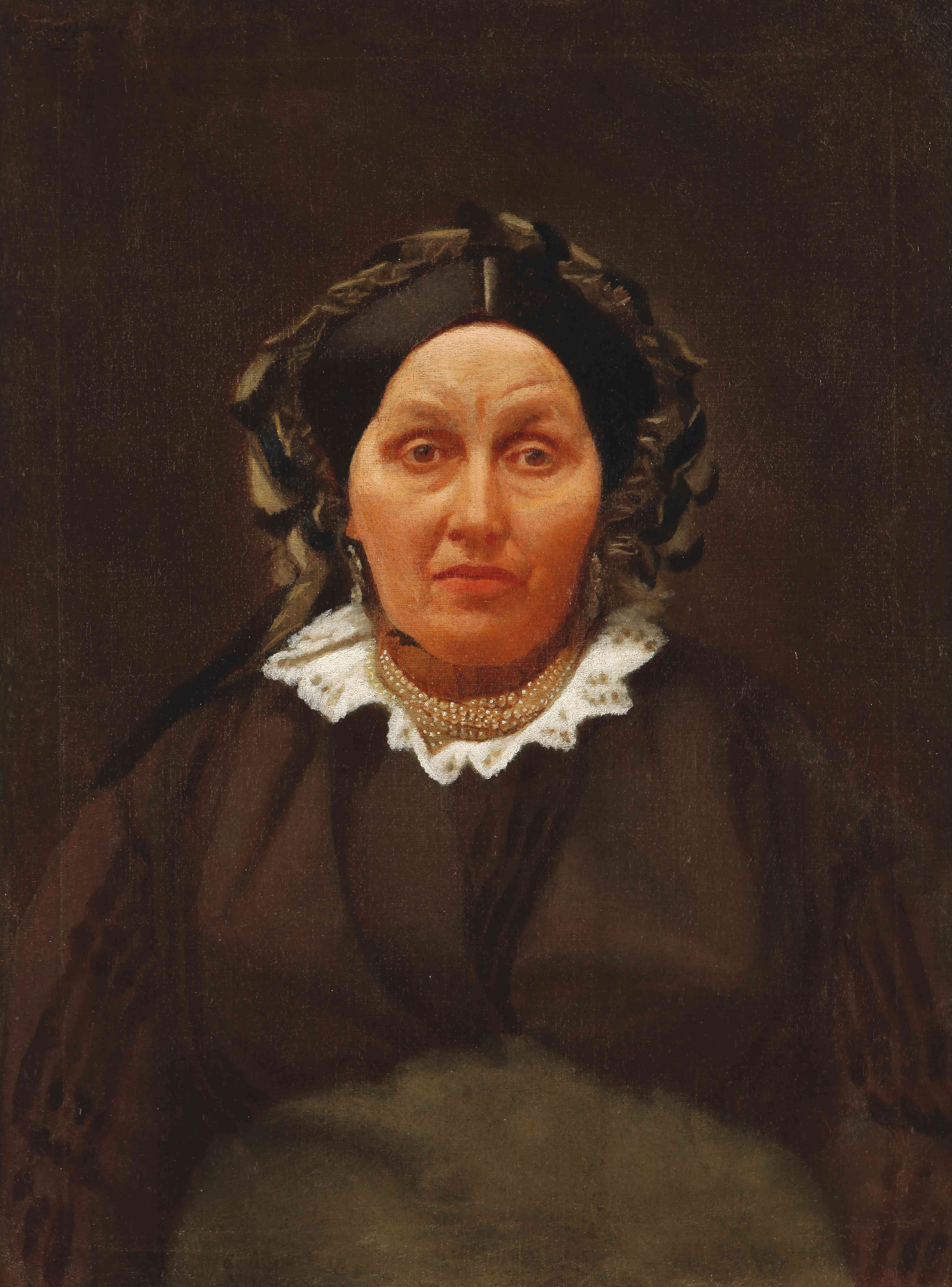
A 19th century Belarusian Jewish woman wearing a wig underneath a silk cap or bonnet

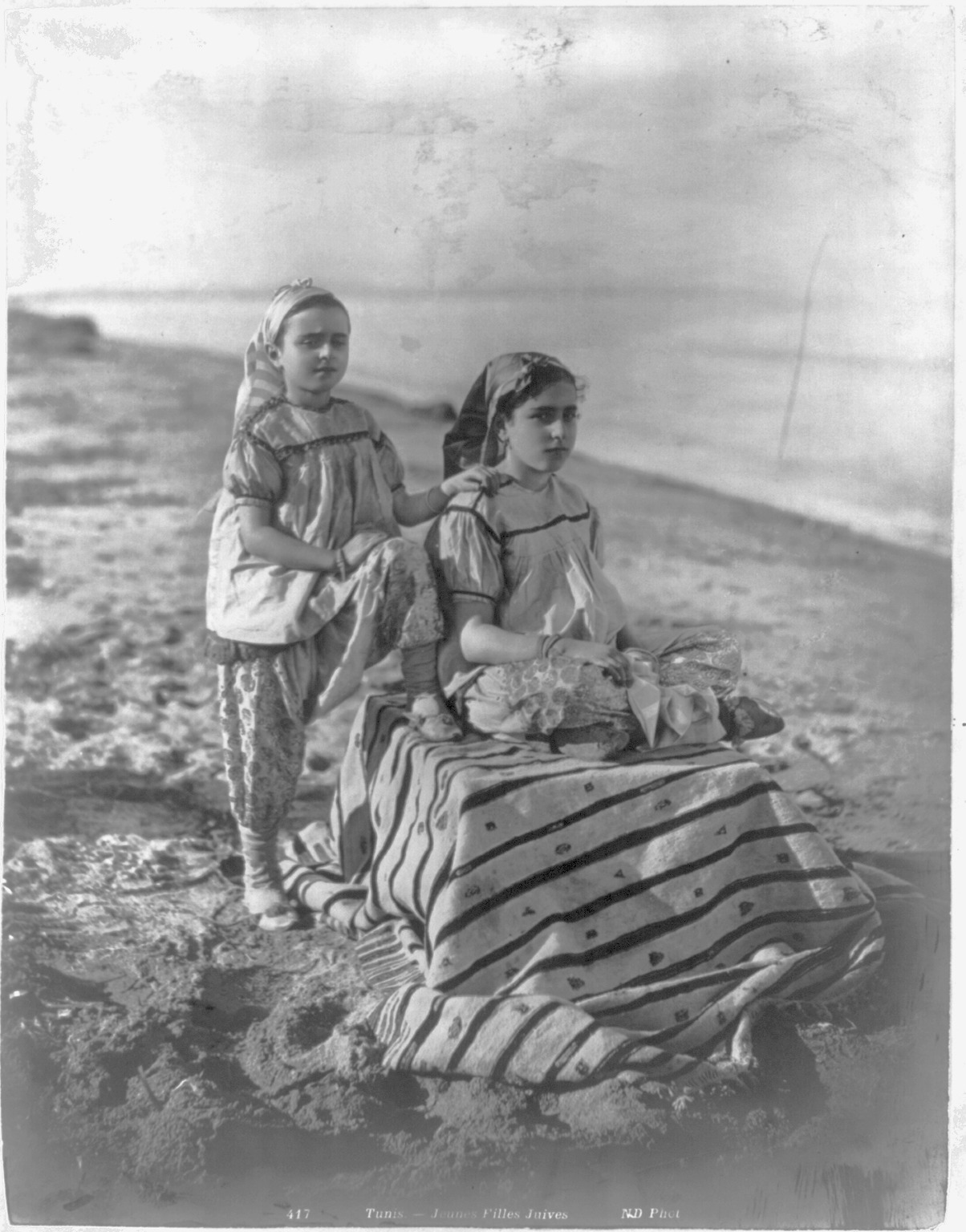
19th century Tunisian Jewish girls wearing headscarves

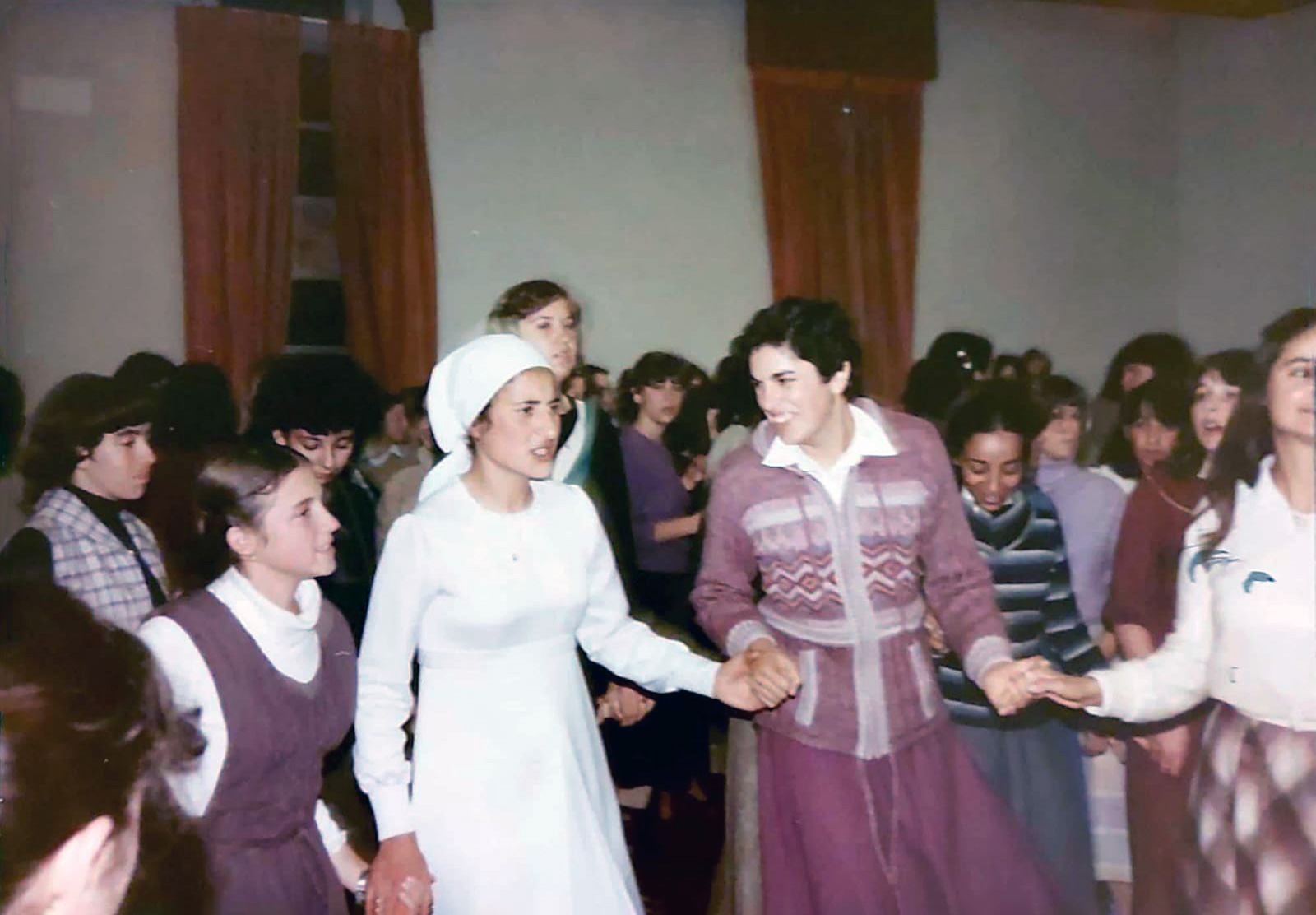
A just-married Jewish woman in a white headscarf at her wedding in the late 20th century

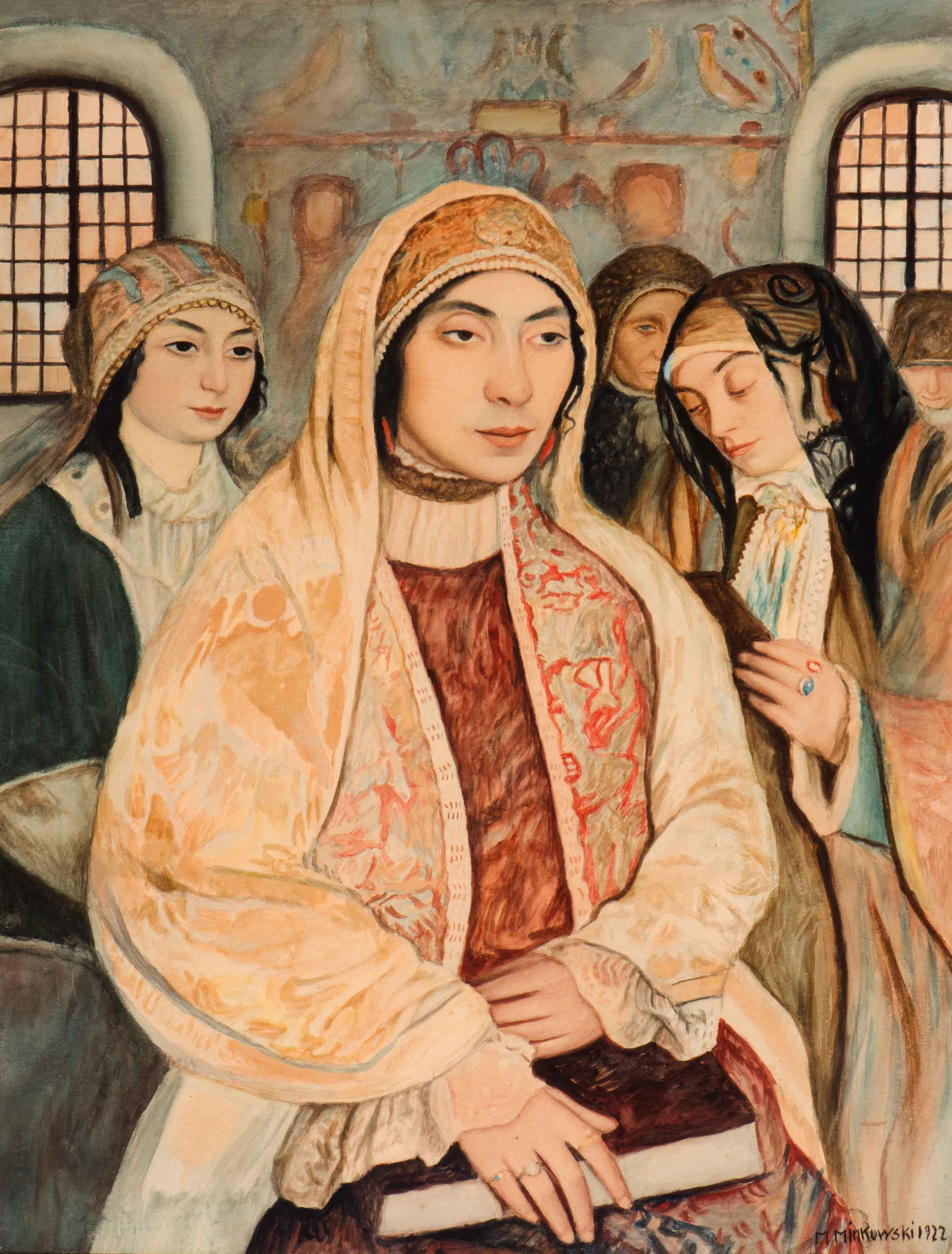
A painting of late 19th or early 20th century Polish Jewish women in synagogue, wearing decorated caps with shawls over them

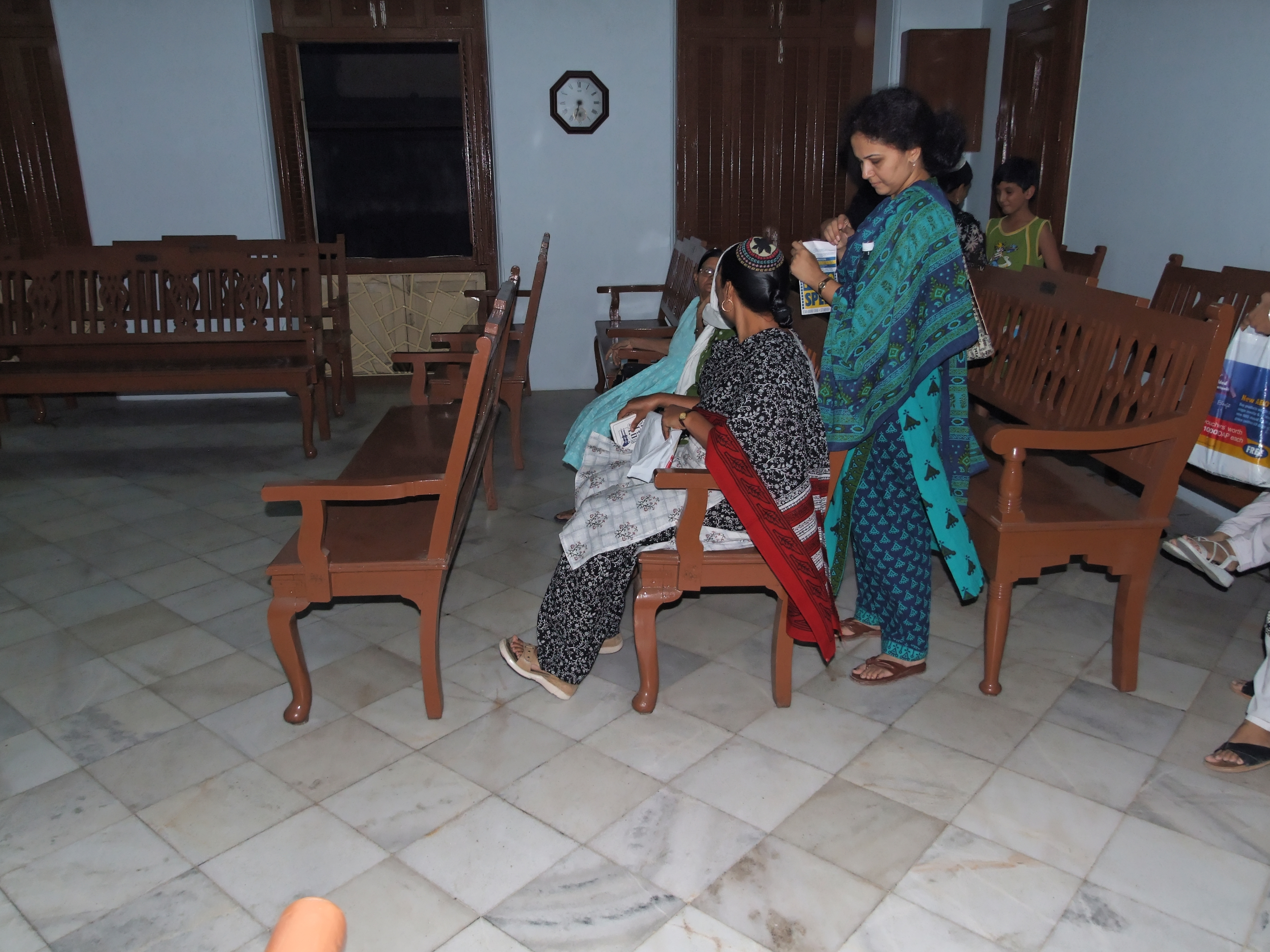
Indian Jewish women. One, seated, is wearing a kippah

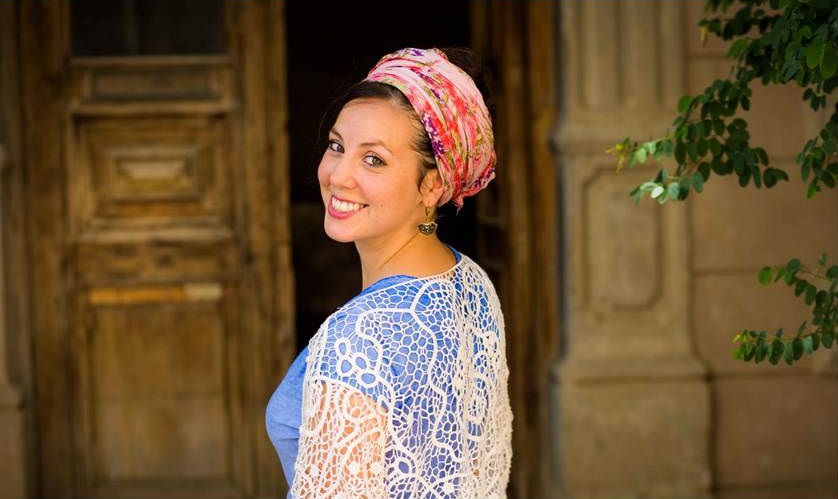
A woman wearing a headwrap that exposes a "tefach" (maximum acceptable amount) of hair

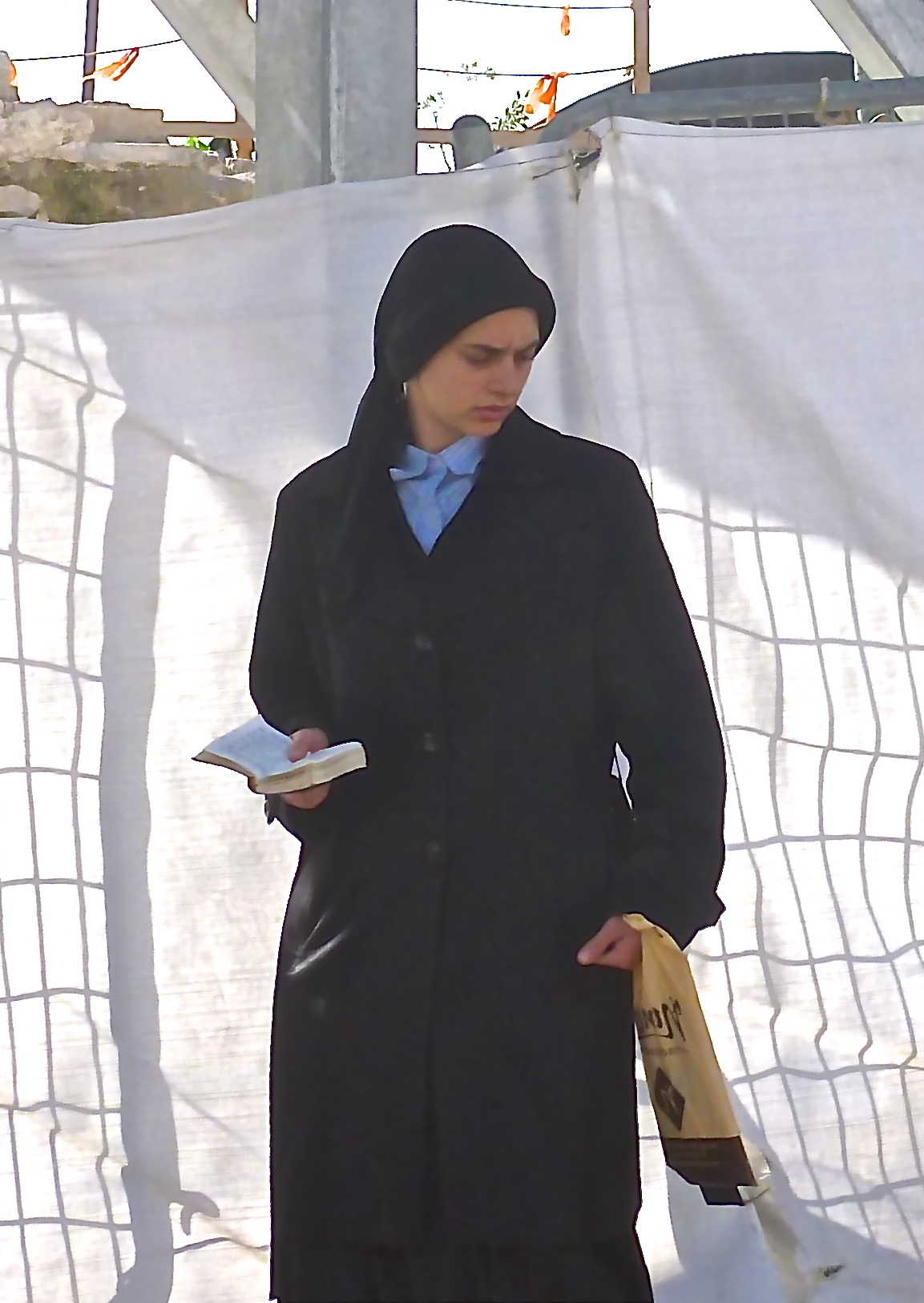
A Haredi woman wearing a black headscarf with padding at the hairline

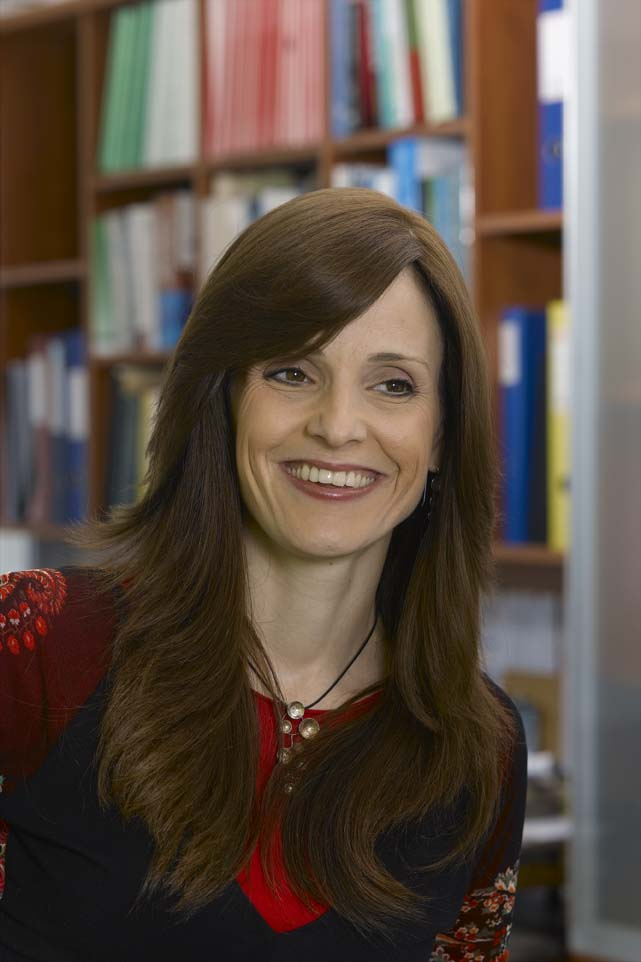
Yonina Eldar, a professor, wearing a sheitel

== See also ==
- Head coverings in Abrahamic faiths:
  - Head covering for Christian women
  - Head covering for Muslim women
- Head coverings in other faiths:
  - Sikh women and turbans
  - Ghoonghat (Hindu and Jain women)
