= Haredi burqa sect =

Subgroup of ultra-Orthodox Jewish women

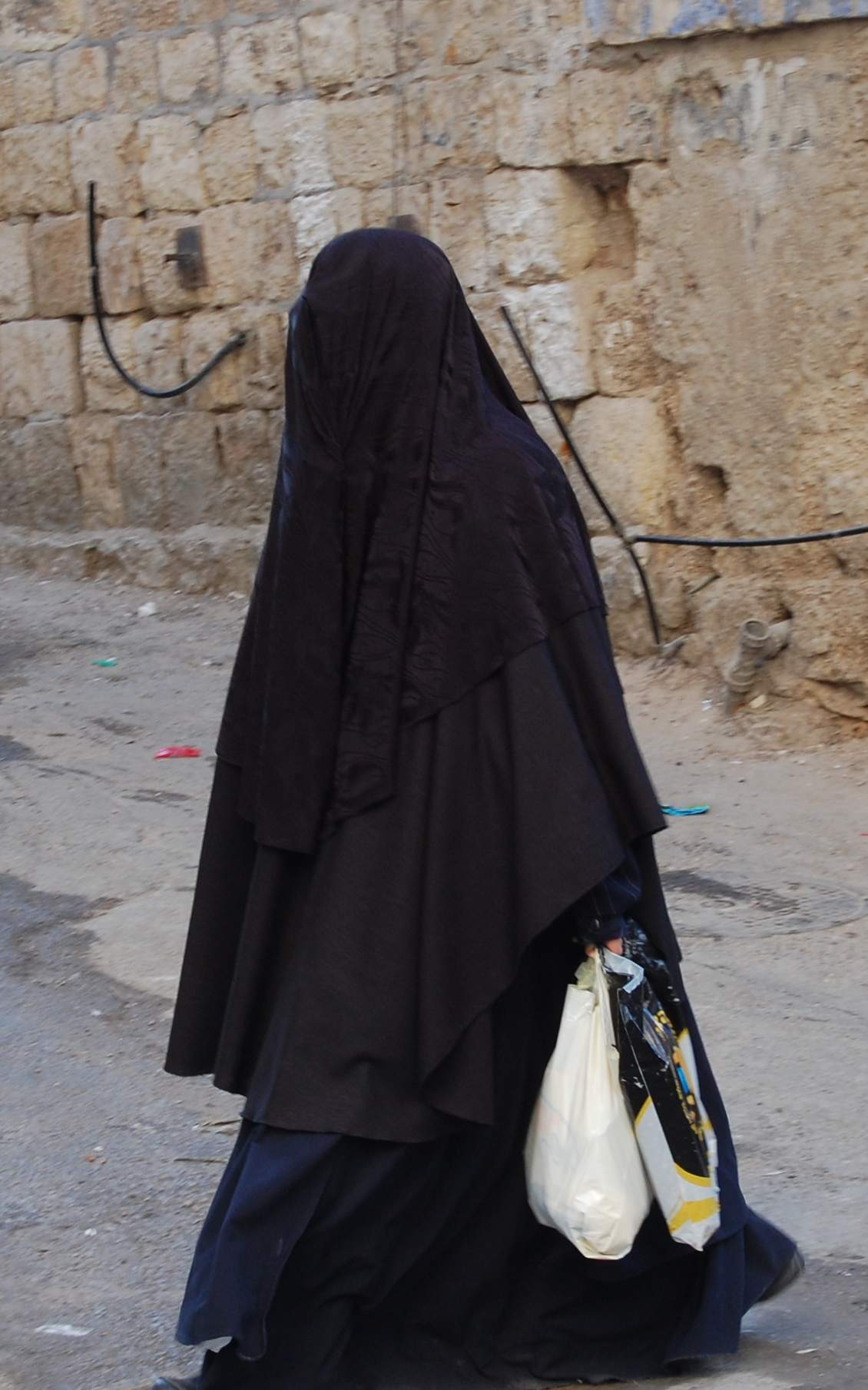
Woman of the Haredi burqa sect in Mea Shearim, a Jewish neighbourhood in Jerusalem, 2012

The "Haredi burqa sect" (Hebrew: נשות השָאלִים, romanized: Neshót haShalím, lit. 'shawl-wearing women') is a community of Haredi Jews that ordains the full covering of a woman's entire body and face, including her eyes, for the preservation of modesty (tzniut) in public. In effect, the community asserts that a Jewish woman must not expose her bare skin to anyone but her husband and immediate family. The garment in question, known as a shal (שָאל, lit. 'shawl'), is also referred to as a frumka—a portmanteau of the Yiddish-language word frum and the Arabic-language word burqa. The Haredi burqa sect, with an estimated population of several hundred people as of 2011, is primarily concentrated in Israel, and particularly in the city of Beit Shemesh. These Haredim rarely leave their homes; the married women who do come out in public are accompanied by their daughters, who also don long robes.

In both Israel and the Jewish diaspora, the Haredi burqa sect is controversial, even among the broader Haredi community itself. Several notable Haredi religious organizations, including the Jerusalem-based Edah HaChareidis, have issued strong and vocal statements condemning the burqa sect's radical tenets with regard to women's clothing.

== History ==
The frumka as a mode of dress for Haredi women was initiated by Bruria Keren, an Israeli religious leader who taught a strict (by Orthodox standards) interpretation of Jewish scripture for female adherents. Keren, who covers herself in several layers of clothing, claimed that covering women was originally a Jewish tradition, and that she had seen a 400-year-old picture of Jewish women covered from head to toe. There are also Sephardic women who claim that their mothers covered their bodies entirely, so that their figures could not be discerned. One sect member is reported to have explained that she was "following these rules of modesty to save men from themselves. A man who sees a woman's body parts is sexually aroused, and this might cause him to commit sin. Even if he does not actually sin physically, his impure thoughts are sin in themselves." The religious group, which was estimated to number around 100 in 2008 and may have grown to several hundred as of 2021, is concentrated in Beit Shemesh, but also has followers in Safed and Jerusalem. The majority of the women came from secular backgrounds.

=== Other practices ===
Keren does not speak in front of men, and has taken on various ascetic practices. During her prison term, she was hospitalized several times for malnutrition and other maladies as a result of her refusal to eat provided food. Some members of the group reportedly do not believe in vaccination or modern medicine. On February 8, 2013, one woman's baby allegedly died from untreated flu, with the parents then fleeing the law. On another occasion, a newborn baby had to be taken to a hospital by force, after the mother refused to go to a hospital to give birth to avoid contact with hospitals and physicians. Other cases of child abuse and neglect have been reported within the group.

== Perception in Israeli society ==
The Israeli press has adopted the informal epithet "Taliban mothers" (נשות הטליבאן, Nashot haTaliban) to refer to the followers of Keren's teachings on modesty. According to Miriam Shaviv, the estimated 100 "gullible and needy" Jewish women, for whom Keren was a holy woman, were not forced but convinced by Keren "that the ideal for a woman was not to be seen in public (and not even to be heard – she used to stop talking for days on end). Negating themselves, she was telling them, making themselves invisible, was the height of frumkeit, while, in fact, it has no basis whatsoever in halachah". The Israel National Council for the Child has requested that the Welfare Ministry and Social Affairs investigate the matter and ensure this behavior is not harmful to the girls.

=== Religious and legal reaction ===
The response by other Ultra Orthodox schools has been stronger than the rest of the public, and is characterized by consternation, particularly against the shal garment. An anonymous pashkevil condemning the "cult" of "epikoros" women was posted in Jerusalem in September 2011. The Edah HaChareidis issued an edict declaring the act of wearing the shawl to be a sexual fetish as deviant as scant clothing or nudity. "There is a real danger that by exaggerating, you are doing the opposite of what is intended, [resulting in] severe transgressions in sexual matters", explains Edah member Rabbi Shlomo Pappenheim. The religious court of Beit Shemesh issued a sharp condemnation of the group, and warned Jewish women and girls not to be drawn after them or follow their customs.

People in Beit Shemesh, including some of the most religiously radical ultra-Orthodox sects, themselves considered this sect to be zealous to the point of ridicule. Even Sikrikim came out against the phenomenon of wearing veils, which they consider extreme. The women were regularly ostracized and humiliated by local Haredim because of their clothing. "We pulled them off buses and yelled at them, 'Desecrators of God's name!'", one inhabitant said. The movement has caused severe distress among the women's husbands and relatives, though most husbands endure it. Some men accuse the covered women of being immodest, because they draw more attention to themselves with their unusual dress. One man pleaded with a rabbinical court for a ruling to force his wife to stop wearing the burka. The court instead ruled the woman's behaviour so "extreme" and ordered the couple to undergo immediate religious divorce.

In 2014, Israeli police shot a member of the sect after she had walked into the Western Wall area without stopping at a security checkpoint. She survived, and was taken to hospital for treatment.

=== Literature ===
Yair Nehorai, an Israeli lawyer who has represented individuals involved in the "Taliban Mother" case and other ultra-Orthodox extremists, has written a book loosely based on the real-life "Taliban Mother" case. The book, Taliban Son, has been released in Hebrew and in a German translation.

== Similar movements ==
Another Haredi group which requires female adherents to wear Islamic-style veils is the Lev Tahor cult of Israeli-Canadian rabbi Shlomo Helbrans. However it is not a "burqa" sect in the strictest sense as its women instead wear the chador and show their faces. A Messianic claimant and faith healer from Tel Aviv named Goel Ratzon reportedly lived with 32 women who neighbors said "wore modest clothing that neighbors likened to those of religious Muslims" before he was arrested.

== See also ==
- Jewish fundamentalism
- Lev Tahor
