= Yair Nehorai =

Israeli lawyer and author

Yair Nehorai (Hebrew: יאיר נהוראי) is an Israeli lawyer and author, best known for his novel Taliban Son (Hebrew: וַתְּהִי-לִי אִמִּי קִבְרִי; the Hebrew title is taken from Jeremiah 20:17) and for representing a series of high-profile cases involving the most extreme religious groups in Israel.

His novel Taliban Son (released by Steimatzky in 2011), is loosely based on the famous “Taliban Mother” case, in which Nehorai represented both the son and the husband of the female leader of a Jewish extremist group, charged with child abuse.
