= Shlomo Helbrans =

Israeli anti-Zionist Rebbe

Rebbe Shlomo Helbrans
- Title: Rebbe of Lev Tahor

Personal life
- Born: Erez Shlomo Elbarnes; 5 November 1962 Kiryat HaYovel, West Jerusalem
- Died: July 7, 2017 (aged 54) Chiapas, Mexico
- Buried: Shlomo Helbrans is buried in an undisclosed location southeast of Guatemala City, near the municipality of Oratorio, Guatemala.
- Spouse: Rebbetzin Malka Azulai-Helbrans
- Children: Nachman Helbrans; Yoel Henich Helbrans; Miriam Laver; Sarah Feige Teller; Son Unknown; Daughter Unknown
- Parent(s): Pinhas and Yocheved Elbarnes

Religious life
- Religion: Judaism
- Denomination: Haredi Judaism

Jewish leader
- Successor: Rabbi Nachman Helbrans
- Organisation: Lev Tahor

Shlomo Erez Helbrans (Hebrew: שלמה הלברנץ; 5 November 1962 – 7 July 2017) was an Israeli-born Rabbi. He was the founder and Rebbe of Lev Tahor.

Originally having established his community in Israel, which he claimed to have modelled after the Satmar Hasidic movement, Helbrans moved his community to the United States, where he was convicted in 1994 for kidnapping, for which he served two years in prison. During this time he was accused by a few former community members of child abuse, serving medicine and psychological pills, and using various punishments on his followers. He was deported back to Israel, but in 2001 he fled to Canada, where he reestablished his community in Sainte-Agathe-des-Monts, Quebec, applying for and attaining refugee status for himself two years later. In November 2013, amid clashes with the education authorities, most members of the group left for Ontario, again claiming religious persecution.

On 7 July 2017, Helbrans drowned while performing a ritual immersion in a river in Mexico at the age of 54.

== Life ==
A native of Jerusalem′s Kiryat HaYovel neighborhood, Helbrans was born as Erez Shlomo Elbarnes to Pinhas and Yocheved Elbarnes, Kurdish Jews from Israel. He became Bar Mitzvah and then studied at a yeshiva in Jerusalem.

In 1988 he was part of the 'Arachim' movement, who preach and advocate Jewish religious studies for secular Jews. After several years, he established an independent yeshiva named Lev Tahor.

In 1990, Helbrans moved his community to the United States, which he claimed was due to his anti-Zionist views, and opened a small Lev Tahor yeshiva in Brooklyn where he gave Jewish study lessons to young students.

In 1994, Helbrans was accused of assisting a 13-year-old boy named Shay Fima (or Shay Reuven) to go into hiding from his mother, a secular woman who had brought him to study at the yeshiva for his bar mitzvah. The subsequent religious conflict that ensued led to Fima's becoming emotionally attached to Helbrans, who denied any involvement in the boy's disappearance. He was arrested but released, allegedly due to political reasons, with the district attorney wishing not to clash with the ultra-Orthodox community of New York before the elections. Two years later he was arrested again, after being implicated during a wired interview with the father, in cooperation with the Federal Bureau of Investigation. During the trial, Shay Fima Reuven took the stand as a witness, described his running and hiding, and completely denied the involvement of Helbrans, but rather claimed that he had run from his mother who beat him. Helbrans was found guilty, convicted, and imprisoned for two years. He was originally sentenced to four to 12 years in prison, but in June 1996 an appeals court, while not accepting his innocence, reduced the sentence to two to six years due to good faith. Three days later, he was placed in a work release program. After protests, since Rabbi Helbrans lost his permanent resident status and was not allowed to work in the US, he was moved back to prison until the end of his two-year term.

Accusations of child abuse and other atrocities committed inside his community with "cult-like" features, were prevalent in the media dealing with the story. The high-profile case drew much attention in Israel and in the U.S., and gained further attention when Helbrans successfully convinced New York prison authorities to waive their requirement that all prisoners be shaved for a photograph upon entering prison, a violation of strict Jewish law in his opinion, and to accept a computer-generated image of what he would have looked like clean-shaven instead.

In November 1996, following the State Parole Board decision to release Helbrans after two years in prison, the case rose to near scandal with suspicions that the Pataki administration was providing him special treatment.

After his release from prison, Helbrans ran a yeshiva in Monsey, New York. Helbrans was deported to Israel, where he was to be sentenced for various accusations by people whose family members had joined the community Lev Tahor.

Helbrans subsequently fled to Canada, where in 2003 he was granted refugee status, on the basis that he would be persecuted in Israel due to his religious beliefs. Some members of his community fled to Guatemala.

== Marriage and children ==
Much about Shlomo's married life and children is shrouded in mystery. Helbrans married his wife Malka Azulai, also a baalas teshuva from Kiryat Ata, in an arranged match when he was 17 years old. Years later Malka left the cult and escaped to Israel after she was severely beaten by community members after speaking out against rampant child abuse within the community. Their daughter, Sarah Feige Teller, also escaped the community with her two daughters after she had been excommunicated for two years. Sarah Feige is married to Aron Aryeh Teller, a radical and head of the yeshiva in Lev Tahor. Miriam Helbrans, Shlomo's second daughter, died at 24 years old after suffering from a severe allergic reaction to sesame. Her brother and the current leader of Lev Tahor, Nachman, allegedly forced her to consume bread containing sesame.

== Lev Tahor ==
Helbrans' 200-person community, Lev Tahor, is considered extreme and radical by other Jewish groups. In Israel, it is nicknamed "Jewish Taliban" and "the Taliban sect." The group has followers in Israel, particularly in the city of Bet Shemesh, in addition to Europe, the U.S., Canada, and Guatemala.

Another convicted rabbi, Eliur Chen, had found refuge in the Lev Tahor community while fleeing the authorities.

During November 2013, Quebec authorities summoned Lev Tahor members to court on allegations that their homeschooling was not compliant with Quebec's education standards. The court case also called for the community to release the 14 children of one of Helbrans' sons due to his previously having left the community. A few days later, community members fled to Ontario, settling in the municipality of Chatham-Kent. On 27 November 2013, a youth court judge in Quebec ordered that 14 children from the community be placed temporarily in foster care, undergo medical exams, and receive psychological support. The hearing in the St. Jérôme courthouse, took place in the absence of the Lev Tahor parents, who sent a lawyer instead. The order was not immediately enforced because the parents, one of whom was Helbrans' son who had previously left the community, were residents of Ontario, triggering a long legal battle. However, on 3 February 2014, an Ontario Judge decided to send back the 14 children to Quebec. While pending an appeal, the parents and children left Canada to Guatemala and other locations. Some were returned, triggering another legal battle, still pending.

== Death ==
On Friday 7 July 2017, Helbrans was found drowned in a river in the Mexican state of Chiapas. His body was pulled from the river by rescue forces on Friday afternoon after he was swept away by strong currents while performing the Mikvah before Shabbat. He was 54 years old.

== Successor ==
Rabbi Nachman Helbrans succeeded his father as the leader of Lev Tahor. Nachman instituted a ban on the consumption of fish, meat, and eggs, based on his own understanding of the guidance of the Rambam in the Mishneh Torah, due to concerns of genetic engineering. Something that most other Jewish groups consider extreme and radical.

== See also ==
- Haredi burqa sect
