= Chador =

Traditional Iranian female garment

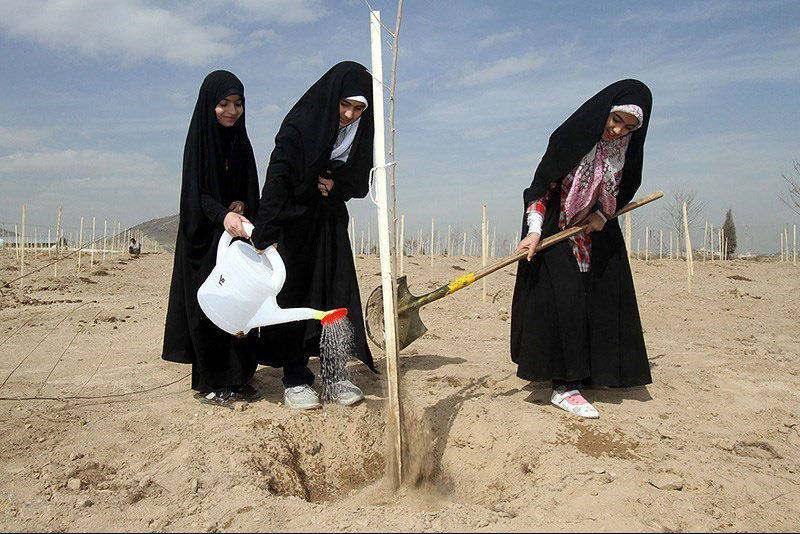
Girls planting trees in Mashhad on Arbor Day wearing chador

A chador (Note: Alternate spellings in English include chadar, chuddar, and chudder, among others.) (Note: English: /ˈtʃʌdər/ CHUD-ər, also US: /ˈtʃɑː-/ CHAHD-; Persian: چادر, romanized: châdor, pronounced [tʃɒːdoɾ]) is an outer garment or open cloak worn by many women in the Persian-influenced countries of Iran, Afghanistan, Azerbaijan, Pakistan, and to a lesser extent Tajikistan, as well as in Shia communities in Iraq, Bahrain, Lebanon, India and Qatif in Saudi Arabia in public spaces or outdoors.

A chador is a full-body-length semicircle of fabric that is open down the front. The garment is pulled over the head, and is held closed at the front by the wearer; the chador has no hand openings, buttons, or clasps. It may also be held closed by being tucked under the wearer's arms. The word in Classical Persian could be used in reference to almost any cloth, headscarf, or even tents. This definition is mostly retained in the Eastern Persian varieties Tajiki and Dari, which commonly use reflexes of chādar in reference to almost any cloth or scarf, including loosely worn scarves that would be inappropriate to call a chador in Iranian Persian.

Before the 1978–1979 Iranian Revolution, black chadors were reserved for funerals and periods of mourning; colorful, patterned fabrics were the norm for everyday wear. Currently, the majority of Iranian women who wear the chador use the black version outside, and reserve light-colored chadors for indoor use.

== Historical background ==
=== Ancient and early Islamic times ===
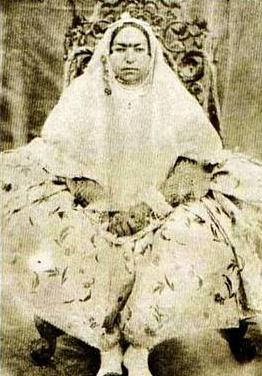
Malek Jahan Khanom, regent of Qajar Iran in 1848

Fadwa El Guindi locates the origin of the veil in ancient Mesopotamia, where "wives and daughters of high-ranking men of the nobility had to veil". The veil marked class status, and this dress code was regulated by sumptuary laws.

One of the first representation of a chador is found on Ergili sculptures and the "Satrap sarcophagus" from Persian Anatolia.

Bruhn/Tilke, in their 1941 A Pictorial History of Costume, do show a drawing, said to be copied from an Achaemenid relief of the 5th century BC, of an individual with their lower face hidden by a long cloth wrapped around the head. Some have mistakenly claimed this to be a woman, but it is actually a Mede soldier. Achaemenid women in art were almost always uncovered. One of the earliest written records of chador can be found in Pahlavi scripts from the sixth century as a female head dress worn by Zoroastrian women.

It is likely that the custom of veiling continued through the Seleucid, Parthian, and Sasanian eras. Veiling was not limited to noble women but was practiced also by Persian kings.

During the Islamic era, the chador retained the meaning of adornment to some extent in Iran, but over time, it took on the meaning of Islam and the Islamic hijab which was one of the concepts of Quran and Islam which was considered a limitation of women.

=== Before Islam ===
In some artifacts remaining from the Achaemenid era, such as a relief in Ergili (in northwestern Anatolia), a fabric design in Pazyryk, and certain Greco-Iranian seals, coverings resembling modern-day chadors can be observed. Some statues from the Parthian era depict women wearing coverings similar to chadors, placed over a headscarf.

=== After Islam ===
During the Islamic period, the chador merely represented one type of clothing adapted to comply with Islamic dress codes and has never had a uniform function, shape, stitching, size, or even color. Based on literary evidence, in both pre- and post-Islamic Iran, the chador was used both as a covering for the face or head and as a full-body garment.

In its latter meaning, the chador has found various synonyms in Arabic, one of which is "Hibrā." This term referred to the women’s covering during the Umayyad Caliphate (41–132 AH) and was considered a type of mulāyah. Mulāyah was the common covering for women outside the home in the early Abbasid Caliphate (132–656 AH), which covered the entire body. In an illustration from a copy of "Al-Maqamat" by Al-Hariri, women are seen wearing coverings similar to today’s chador at gatherings of sermon and justice, dating back to no later than the mid-6th century.

Our understanding of the exact description of this covering, regardless of its name, is largely related to more recent periods, particularly from the Safavid and Ottoman eras onwards. Accordingly, women did not view the chador solely as a veil or covering; aesthetic considerations, especially in the choice of fabric and decorations, played a significant role. The influence of women’s financial status and social class was evident in determining the fabric and embellishments of the chador.

Elite women in Fes, unlike ordinary women in Morocco, adorned the edges of their chadors with white silk or other colors during the Ottoman era, fastening them with large gold or silver rings at the chest. During the Qajar era, the chadors of elite women were often made of silk, while less affluent women used "Dabit" fabric for their chadors. Elite women embroidered their black chadors with gold thread and attached silver or silver-plated borders, which gradually gave way to red borders in colors like blue, brown, and white, measuring two fingers wide. During this period, "Abaya" chadors, which were highly valuable and imported from Baghdad, were in high demand among these women.

=== Pahlavi era (1925–1979) ===
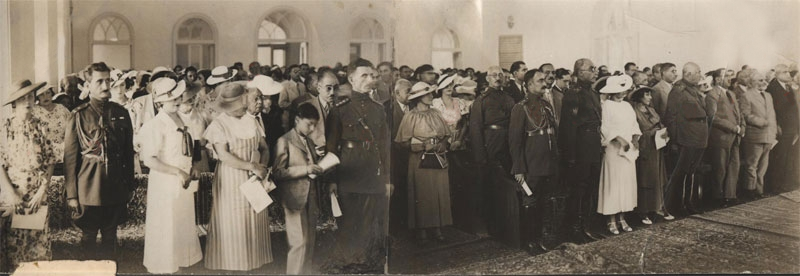
Military commanders of the Iranian armed forces, government officials, and their wives commemorating the abolition of the veil in 1936

The 20th century Pahlavi ruler Reza Shah banned the chador and all hijab during the Kashf-e hijab in 1936, as incompatible with his modernizing ambitions. According to Mir-Hosseini, as cited by El Guindi, "the police were arresting women who wore the veil and forcibly removing it". This policy outraged the Twelver Shia clerics, and ordinary men and women, to whom "appearing in public without their cover was tantamount to nakedness". However, she continues, "this move was welcomed by Westernized and upperclass men and women, who saw it in liberal terms as a first step in granting women their rights".

Eventually, rules of dress code were relaxed, and after Reza Shah's abdication in 1941, the compulsory element in the policy of unveiling was abandoned, though the policy remained intact throughout the Pahlavi era. According to Mir-Hosseini, 'between 1941 and 1979, wearing hejab [hijab] was no longer an offence, but it was a real hindrance to climbing the social ladder, a badge of backwardness, and a marker of class. A headscarf, let alone the chador, prejudiced the chances of advancement in work and society not only of working women, but also of men, who were increasingly expected to appear with their wives at social functions. Fashionable hotels and restaurants sometimes even refused to admit women with chador, schools and universities actively discouraged the chador, although the headscarf was tolerated. It was common to see girls from traditional families, who had to leave home with the chador, arriving at school without it and then putting it on again on the way home'.

=== Iranian Revolution ===
After the 1979 Iranian Revolution, compulsory hijab were introduced, which was met with opposition from women during the 1979 International Women's Day protests in Tehran.

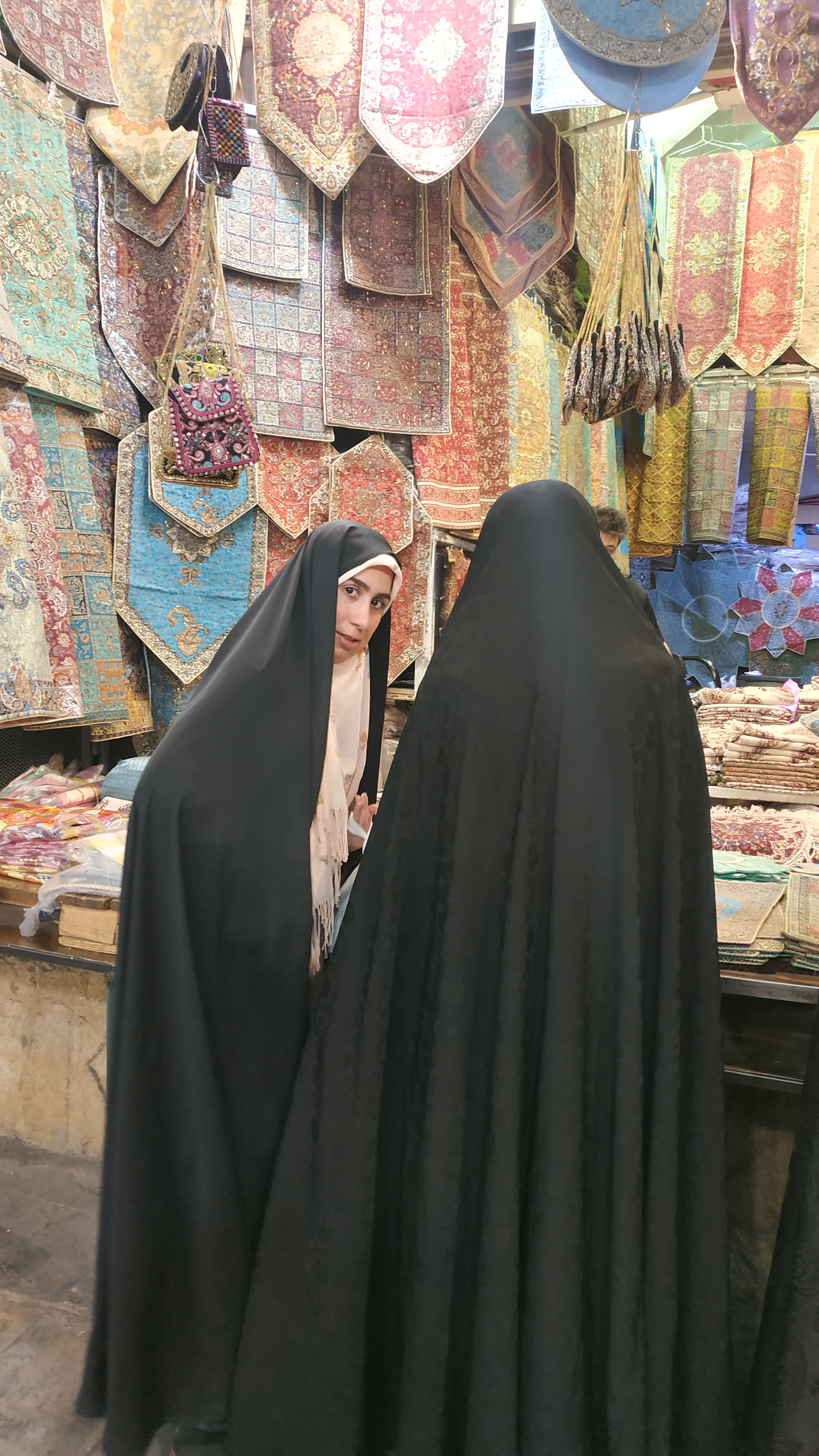
Women wearing chadors in Shiraz, Iran, 2019

In April 1980, during the Iranian Cultural Revolution, it was decided that it would be mandatory for women in government offices and educational institutions to observe the veil. In 1983, a dispute regarding the veiling broke out, and public conflict was motivated by the definition of veiling and its scale (so-called "bad hijab" issue), sometimes followed even by clashes against those who were perceived to wear improper clothing. Government felt obligated to deal with this situation; so, on 26 July 1984, Tehran's public prosecutor issued a statement and announced that stricter dress-code is supposed to be observed in public places such as institutions, theaters, clubs, hotels, motels, and restaurants, while in the other places, it should follow the pattern of the overwhelming majority of people. Stricter veiling implies both chador and more loosely khimar-type headscarf, along with overcoat.

== Usage ==
Before the 1978–1979 Iranian Revolution, black chadors were worn by many women and girls for different purposes. Light, printed fabrics were the norm for everyday wear. Currently, the majority of women who wear the chador reserve the usage of light-colored chadors for around the house or for prayers. Most women who still go outside in urban areas in a light-colored chador are elderly women of rural backgrounds. During the Pahlavi era, such traditional clothing was largely discarded by the wealthier urban upper-class women in favor of modernity and western clothing, although women in small towns and villages continued to wear the chador. Traditionally a light coloured or printed chador was worn with a headscarf (rousari), a blouse (pirahan), and a long skirt (daaman); or else a blouse and skirt or dress over pants (shalvar), and these styles continue to be worn by many rural Iranian women, in particular by older women.

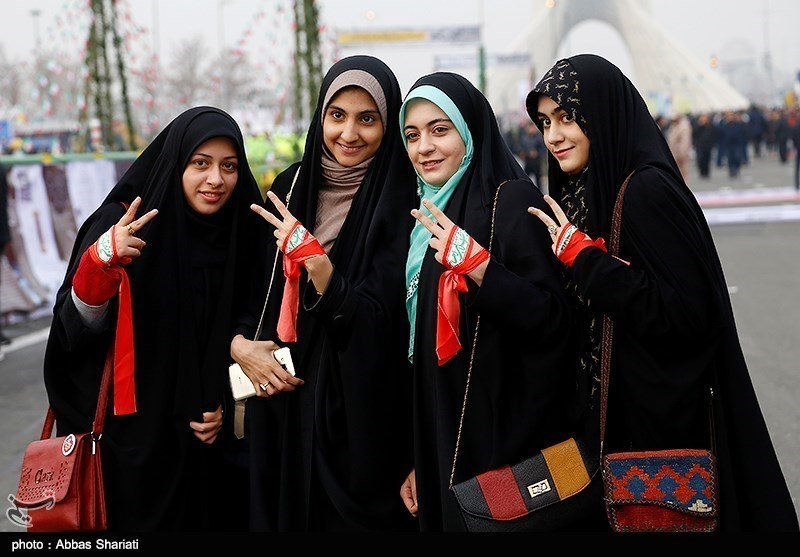
Iranian girls at a 2017 rally wearing chadors

On the other hand, in Iran, the chador does not require the wearing of a veil. Inside the home, particularly for urban women, both the chador and the veil have been discarded, and there, women and teenagers wore cooler and lighter garments; while in modern times, rural women continue to wear a light-weight printed chador inside the home over their clothing during their daily activities. The chador is worn by some Iranian women, regardless of whether they are Sunni or Shia, but is considered traditional to Persian Iranians, with Iranians of other backgrounds wearing the chador or other traditional forms of attire. For example, Arab Iranian women in Western and Southern Iran retain their overhead abaya which is similar to the overhead abaya worn in other Arab majority countries which historically fell under the Iranian cultural sphere like Iraq, Kuwait, and Bahrain.

== Color of chador ==
The choice of chador color was influenced by women’s tastes, which were also affected by their age and social standing. For example, Egyptian women in the years 1249–1251 AH (1833–1835 AD) wore black silk chadors, while their daughters wore white ones. In Turkey, after the reforms, despite the prevalence of chadors in various colors, younger women preferred turquoise, jade, and purple shades.

In Qajar Iran, elite women often favored black or dark purple and blue chadors. Today, while in cities—especially larger ones—the color of women’s chadors worn outside the home is predominantly black, in rural areas and cities with traditional cultural symbols, colorful chadors are still observed. Women’s prayer chadors, both in urban and rural areas, are generally lighter in color and often white.

== Beyond Iran ==
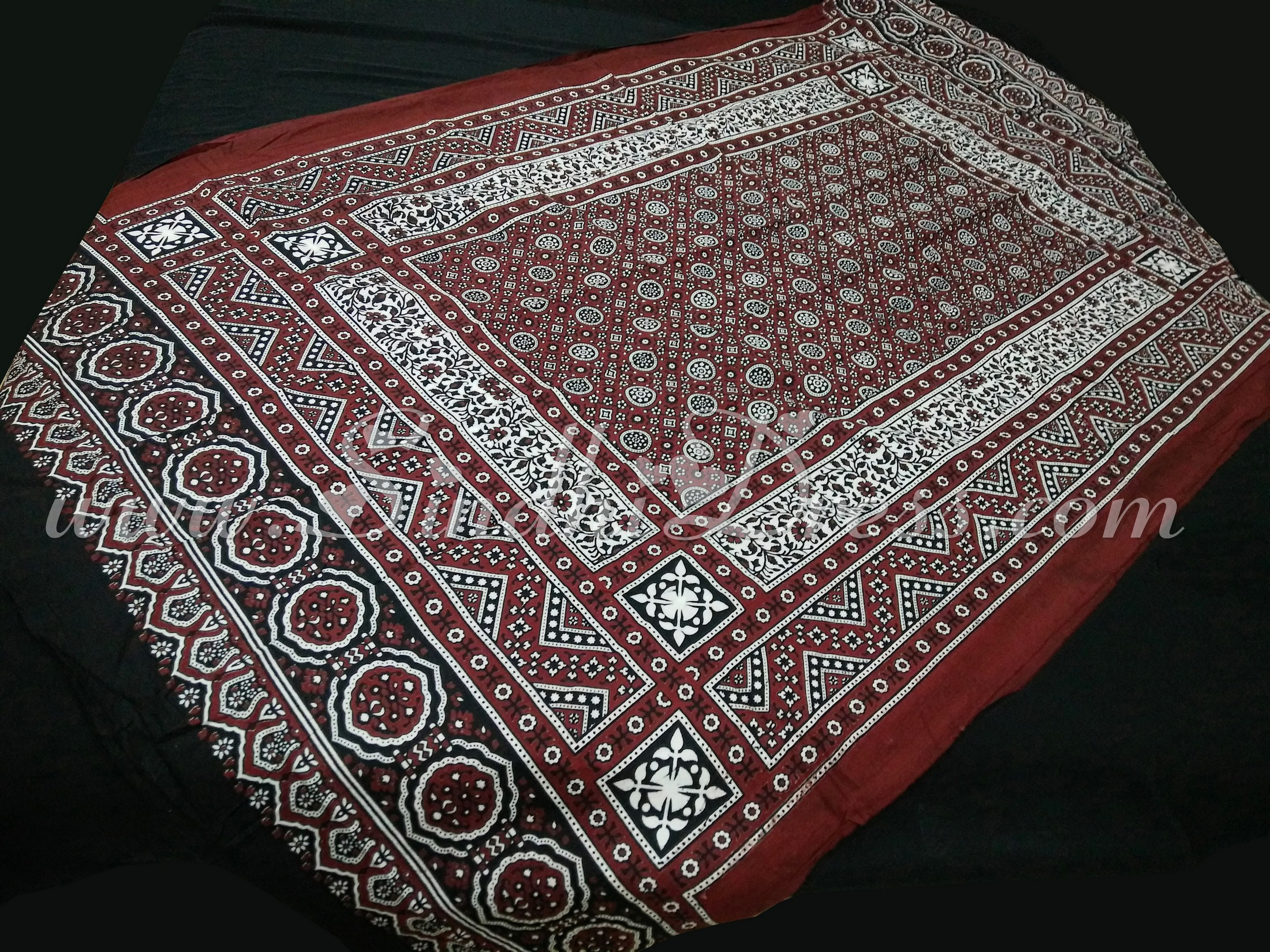
A sample chadar from Sindh

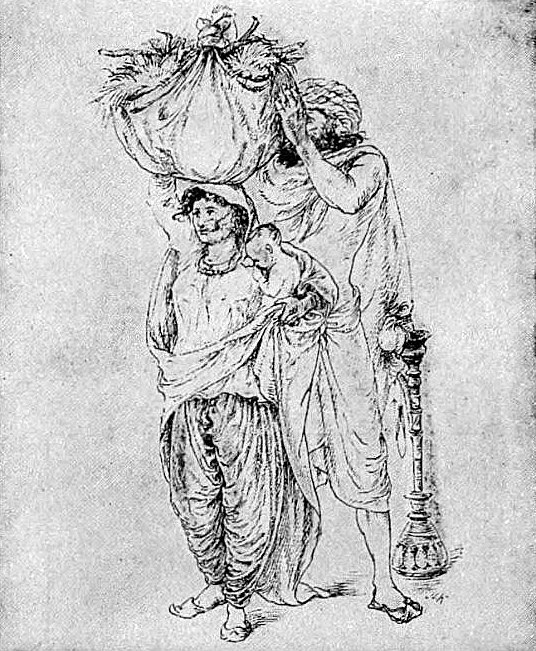
Drawing of a Jat Muslim couple published in the 1911 edition of Encyclopædia Britannica, showing both man and woman wearing chadar as upper garments.

Chadar as an item for personal use

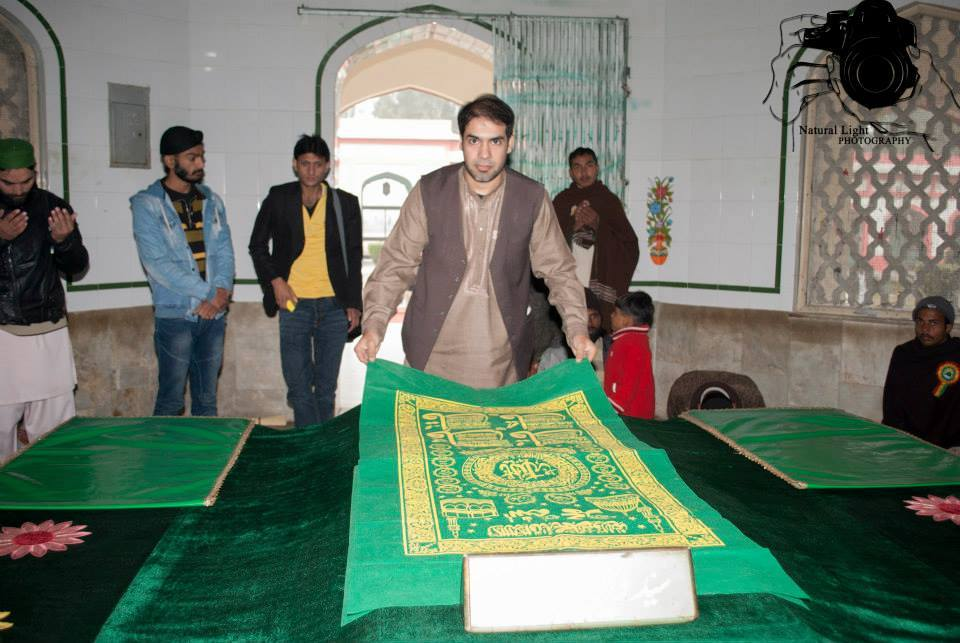
A Pakistani Muslim offering chadar over the grave of Waris Shah

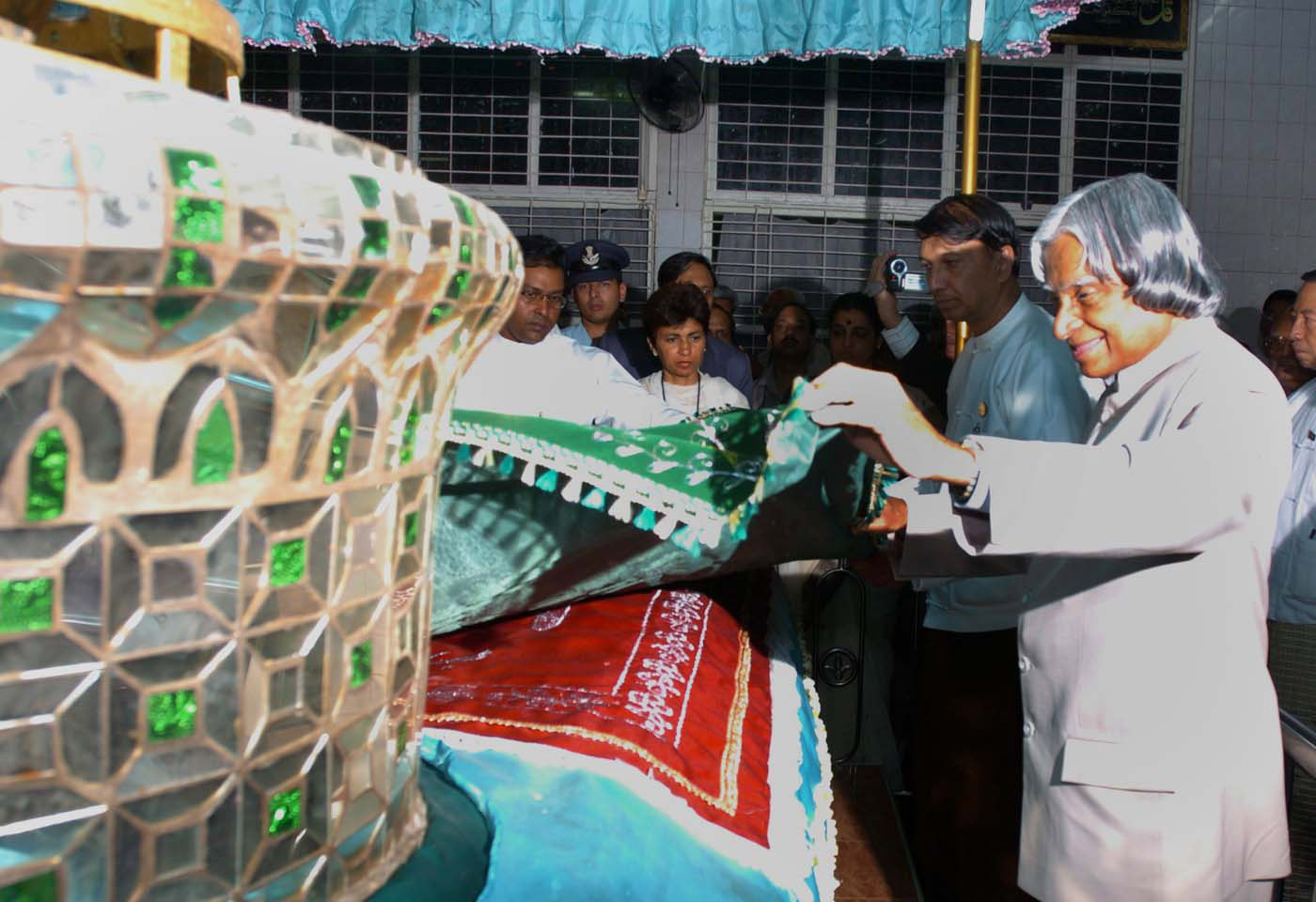
A. P. J. Abdul Kalam offering chadar at the grave of Bahadur Shah Zafar

Chadar as a devotional object. These are not meant for personal use

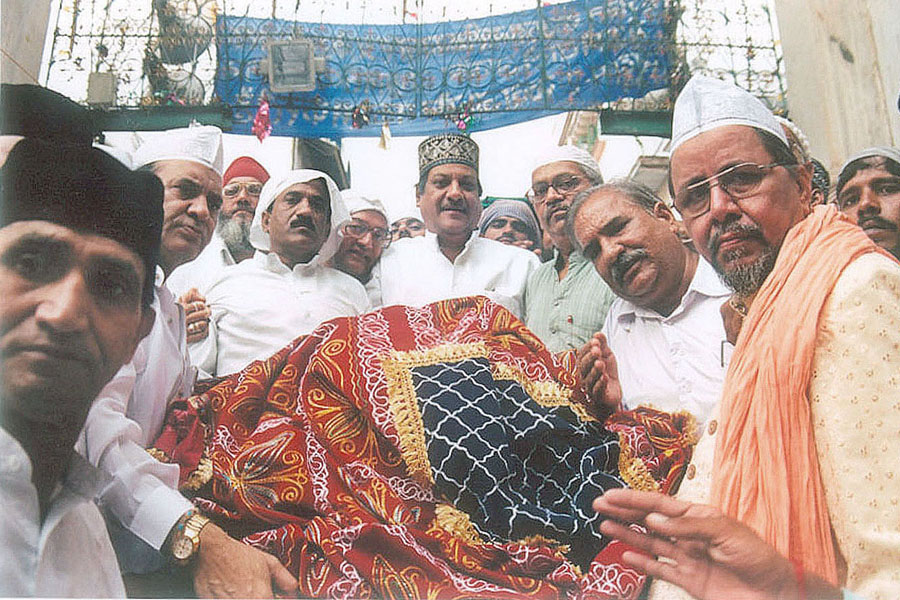
Prithviraj Chavan offering chadar over the grave of Mu'in al-Din Chishti in Ajmer Sharif

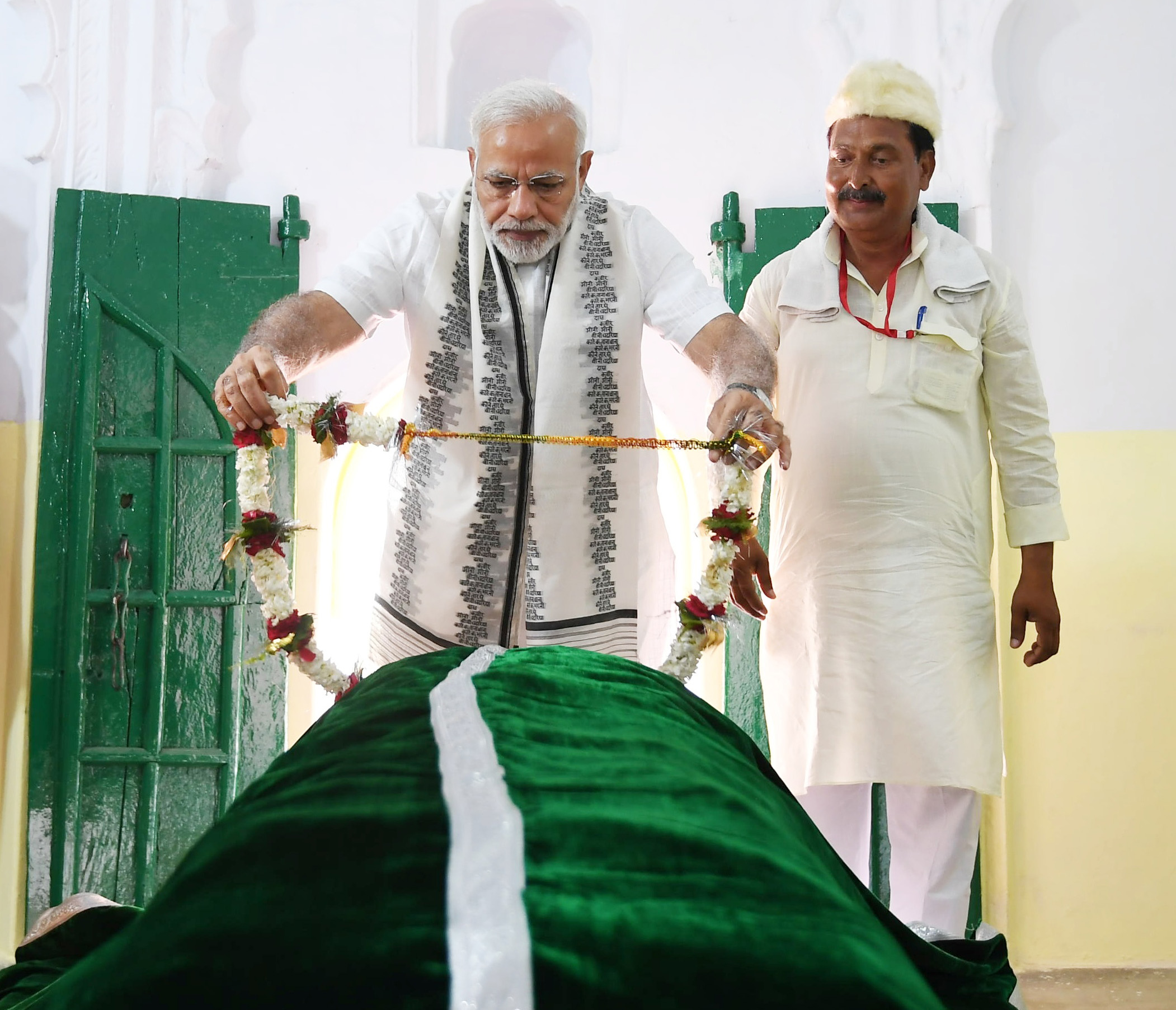
Narendra Modi offering chadar over the grave of Kabir at Varanasi

Usage of chadar as a political tool

The Persian word entered South Asia, and appeared in the Hindustani language as cādar (चादर, anglicized as chaddar, chuddar and chudder). However, an Indian and Pakistani cādar may more closely resemble a dupatta. In many Indo-Aryan languages like Hindi and Bengali, cādar is the vernacular term used to refer to the uttariya. The Hindustani word can also refer to other type of sheets, such as bed sheets. Draping the graves of Sufi saints with chadar is a devotional practice common among Muslims in the region. Many non-Muslim politicians in India engage in this act as a way of reaching out to Muslims. There are also a small Haredi Jewish groups in which the women wear black head-to-toe cloaks similar to the chador, such as the extremist Lev Tahor.

== See also ==
- Abaya
- Çarşaf
- Jilbāb
- Headscarf
- Women in Iran
- Islamic veiling practices by country
