= Miriam Shaviv =

Israeli writer

Miriam Shaviv (born 24 August 1976) is a columnist for the Jewish Chronicle in London. She was previously The Jewish Chronicle's Foreign Editor, and before that was their Comment and Letters Editor. Born in the United Kingdom but raised in Israel, Canada, and Australia, she has worked as both a journalist and businesswoman.

She is the former literary editor of The Jerusalem Post.
