= Lev Tahor =

Jewish cult

Total population
- 200–300

Founder
- Shlomo Helbrans

Regions with significant populations
- Israel: 1988–1990, 2000–2003
- United States: 1990–2000
- Canada: 2003–2013
- Bosnia and Herzegovina: 2022
- Guatemala: 2013, 2024
- Mexico: c. 2017
- Colombia: 2025

Languages
- Yiddish, Hebrew, English

Lev Tahor (Hebrew: לֵב טָהוֹר, romanized: Leḇ Ṭahōr, lit. 'pure heart') is an ultra-Orthodox Jewish sect often characterized as a cult founded in Israel by Shlomo Helbrans in 1988. It consists of about 200–300 members. The group engages in child sexual abuse, pedophilia and rape. The group follows a fundamentalist form of Jewish practice and adheres to atypical interpretations of Jewish law, including practices such as lengthy prayer sessions, arranged marriages between teenagers, and head-to-toe black coverings for girls and women beginning at the age of three. The group has faced accusations of kidnapping, sexual abuse, and child abuse, and some of its members have been charged and convicted of related offenses. Lev Tahor is considered a fringe, extreme and condemned cult by many Orthodox Jewish groups.

The group has moved frequently, being located in Israel from 1988 to 1990, the United States from 1990 to 2000, Israel again from 2000 to 2003, Canada from 2003 to 2013, Guatemala in 2013 (after fleeing Canada), Mexico since around 2017, and in late 2021 - early 2022 they moved between several Eastern European and Balkan countries: in February 2022 they were present in North Macedonia after a short stay in Sarajevo in Bosnia. In early 2022, members of the sect were deported from Bosnia and Herzegovina following local scrutiny over the group's history of alleged child abuse. The group was earlier deported from Romania, Turkey, Albania and Moldova. In late 2025, Colombian authorities rescued a number of minors from Lev Tahor members who had arrived in the country a month prior. They often move in an attempt to flee government child welfare agencies.

== History ==
The group was formed in the 1980s by Israeli leader Shlomo Helbrans. Helbrans moved to the U.S. in the early 1990s, and settled in the Williamsburg neighborhood of Brooklyn, New York. While there, he served time in prison for kidnapping a 13-year-old Israeli boy who was sent to study with him in preparation for the boy's bar mitzvah. Helbrans was released after serving two years, allegedly after receiving preferential treatment by New York governor George Pataki. He then ran a yeshiva in Monsey, New York, and was eventually deported back to Israel. In January 2003, Helbrans moved to Canada. Helbrans may have used false evidence to obtain refugee status, paying the kidnapped boy to testify on his behalf.

Helbrans and his followers settled in Sainte-Agathe-des-Monts, but the members of the group with children left Quebec in November 2013 for Chatham-Kent amid allegations of child neglect. Child protection authorities sought to place the children in the care of Jewish foster families, and had been taking steps to prevent the 127 children from leaving Canada. While in Canada, they acted as a charity, amassing $6 million in assets.

On 5 March 2014, after the Ontario Superior Court of Justice effectuated a ruling of the Superior Court of Quebec as to the disposition of their children under Quebec child-protection law, nine members of the group, including six children, left for Trinidad and Tobago in an attempt to flee to Guatemala. They were returned to Canada days later. The six children were taken into foster care, four of them were later returned to the group, while the hearing for the other two children was scheduled for 27 May 2014. A majority of the group's members subsequently settled in the tourist town San Juan La Laguna. The group refused to send their children to local schools or participate in the community, according to a local resident. In August 2014, a group of elders of the indigenous Tz'utujil people issued an edict stating that the group was not welcome to stay, citing a need to protect the local culture, which is protected under the Constitution of Guatemala. A spokesman for the indigenous council said, "We act in self-defence and to respect our rights as indigenous people."

In 2017, Helbrans drowned in a river while participating in a ritual immersion. An Israeli consular official confirmed the death and identified Helbrans's body. Control of Lev Tahor was left in the hands of Helbrans' son Nachman, said to be "more extreme" than his father. Nachman Helbrans and four other leaders of Lev Tahor were arrested in Mexico in December 2018 in a joint operation between Interpol and the Federal Bureau of Investigation.

In 2018, members of Lev Tahor applied for political asylum in Iran, claiming they were victims of religious persecution by Israel, due to their rejection of Zionism. They even swore allegiance to Iran's supreme leader Ali Khamenei. In November 2021 a group of about 70 members reached the Kurdistan Region of Iraq in an attempt to make their way to Iran, but were detained by Iraqi officials and deported to Turkey. From there they left for Bucharest, Romania.

On January 29, 2025, Interpol arrested member Yoel Alter, for the trafficking of minors, in Guatemala. The 35 year old Israeli citizen was alleged to be a senior member of the cult. Alter was the second cult member to be arrested in Central America in January 2025. Jonathan Emmanuel Cardona Castillo, another member who was on the run after being charged with child abuse, was also arrested at the beginning of the month.

== Practices ==
The community claims to live within the boundaries of Halakha and Jewish tradition, and asserts that their lifestyle is not new or unusual. In the Lev Tahor community, prayers are twice as long as is the norm among other Haredim, and adherents pronounce each word loudly, slowly, and with great emphasis. They have a strict diet that is based on the familiar laws of kashrut. However, their interpretation of these laws is much stricter, limiting certain foods. Most of their food, including their bread, is therefore homemade. The religious beliefs of the Lev Tahor include a rejection of Zionism. According to Ontario Superior Court Judge Lynda Templeton, the traditional way of life of members of the Lev Tahor community is not:

"merely a matter of personal preference, but one of deep religious conviction, shared by an organized group, and intimately related to daily living ... Religion is not simply a matter of theocratic belief, but pervades and determines their entire way of life, regulating it with detail through strictly enforced rules of the community ... The adoption and practice of the Torah to the extent perceived by members of Lev Tahor as desirable or necessary in their daily lives include the type of clothing to be worn at all times; their food preparation and consumption; their language; their moral and social conduct; and their education. All members of Lev Tahor, regardless of age or gender, adhere to the practices and tenets of their faith-based beliefs."

== Controversies ==
Lev Tahor has been accused by its critics (including former followers, estranged families of followers, religious scholars, and law enforcement officials) of child abuse, brainwashing, drug use and forced marriages of teenage girls to men as much as 20 years their senior. The group has been referred to as "Jewish Taliban" by the Israeli, Jewish, and international press.

In an interview with Blackburn Radio on 31 March 2014, Dave Van Kesteren, MP for Chatham-Kent—Essex, Ontario, described the Lev Tahor saga as a "political issue". He added that the issue had been brought up within the Southwest Ontario Caucus, but noted those talks were confidential.

=== Child protection investigation ===
In 2011, while in Canada, the Lev Tahor group came into conflict with the local school board, which took issue with the fact that the children of the group had not been registered in the local schools, and the children were not educated in accordance with the curriculum required by Quebec law. In April 2013, the leaders of the Lev Tahor community developed a contingency plan in the event that the authorities would initiate action and seek to apprehend the children. That August, 21 child services workers began knocking on doors. According to Denis Baraby, director of youth protection services in the area, they discovered some houses that were dirty, had 4–5 children sleeping in one bedroom, some mattresses soaked in urine, and children with fungus on their feet. They began weekly visits.

Quebec police issued search warrants in relation to allegations that members of Lev Tahor sect inflicted psychological and physical abuse on teenage girls. The abuses allegedly involved girls as young as 13 who were imprisoned in basements, and girls aged 14–15 who were married to older men in the group. One woman said she was struck with a belt and a coat hanger, and a pregnant 17-year-old girl said she was beaten by her brother, sexually abused by her father and married by force to a 30-year-old man when she was 15. On 27 November 2013, a Quebec court ruled that 14 children of the group must be placed in foster care, and arrangements were made for the children to be placed in Yiddish-speaking foster homes. On 21 February, a Quebec court ruled the group did not have the right to appeal the previous ruling of a Quebec court, because they failed to file the appeal within a 30-day period, and soon, Canadian authorities began to seek custody of children of Lev Tahor members.

On 3 March 2014, about 15 members of the group took a flight to Guatemala. A group of nine people was intercepted at Trinidad and Tobago. The following day, at least two adults and six children from the group arrived in Guatemala. On 6 March, an Ontarian judge ordered that the 14 children of the two families that fled be placed in foster homes in Ontario, while they waited for the appeal to be heard in court. Two days later, six children of Lev Tahor from two families, their parents, and another adult, were repatriated in Canada after fleeing to Trinidad and Tobago. The following day, a mother less than 18 years old tried to flee to Guatemala with part of her family. She was arrested in Calgary and brought back to Ontario with her baby. On 14 March, three adults and six children who fled to Guatemala appeared before a judge in Panajachel. The judge decided to leave the children with their family. On 17 March, a judge in Guatemala ruled that six children who had fled would be allowed to remain in Guatemala, provided that they check in with the Canadian Embassy within three days. This requirement was later overturned on appeal on 26 March, allowing the group to stay without conditions for up to three months.

On 2 April 2014, seven Lev Tahor members were arrested in a raid performed by Canadian border security. Three of those members were ordered to be deported to their native Israel, but were given the option to appeal and apply for a stay during the appeal process. On 27 April, the young mother was re-united with her baby in foster care. Ten days later, four other children were re-united with their parents.

=== Kidnapping case ===
In December 2018, U.S. authorities charged Nachman Helbrans (age 39), and Mayer Rosner (age 45) with kidnapping two grandchildren of Shlomo Helbrans, whose mother had fled the community after she was ostracized for objecting to her 13-year-old daughter being married to an older man. An FBI agent stated in a court document that two children, a 14-year-old girl and a 12-year-old boy, were kidnapped from their mother's home in Woodridge, New York and transported to Scranton, Pennsylvania. They were then flown to Mexico City, in the charge of Lev Tahor members. Helbrans and Rosner were convicted on 10 November 2021 on the charges of conspiring to transport a minor with intent to engage in criminal sexual activity, conspiring to travel with intent to engage in illicit sexual conduct and international parental kidnapping. On 31 March 2022, Helbrans and Rosner were sentenced to 12 years in prison for child sexual exploitation and kidnapping. On 29 March 2024, brothers Yoil Weingarten, Yakov Weingarten and Shmiel Weingarten were convicted of all charges, including international parental kidnapping, child exploitation and conspiracy to defraud the United States for their role in the 2018 kidnapping.

=== 2024 raid ===
In December 2024, Guatemalan authorities conducted a raid on one of their facilities, removing 160 minors after claims of child abuse and trafficking. The compound was on a farm run by the organization in Oratorio, Santa Rosa.

=== Expulsion from Colombia ===
On 23 November 2025, Colombia Migration with assistance of the Colombian Army conducted a raid in a hotel in the town of Yarumal after receiving a tip from a citizen about the presence of the Lev Tahor members. The raid resulted in the rescue of 17 minors, including five with Interpol notice.

The group had arrived in Colombia from the United States in October 2025 with plans of establishing a colony in the country.

On 1 December 2025, Colombia Migration announced the deportation of the nine adults who had been arrested in the earlier raid. The Colombian Institute of Family Welfare handed over the guardianship of the 17 minors to the New York State Office of Children and Family Services.

== Documentaries ==
Lev Tahor has been investigated in a number of documentaries:

- Israeli programme True Face ran a two-episode series on Lev Tahor in November 2012.
- Global News ran a documentary on Lev Tahor in February 2014 as part of 16×9.
- The Fifth Estate covered Lev Tahor in an hour-long program.
- Mishpacha magazine ran a 15-page cover story on Lev Tahor.
- Ami magazine ran a 32-page cover story on Lev Tahor in its Passover 2014 edition.
- Foreign Policy ran an eight-page story about Lev Tahor in its January/February 2016 issue.
- Channel 2 in Israel ran a documentary on Lev Tahor in October 2016.

== See also ==
- Haredi burqa sect
- Jewish fundamentalism
