= History of the British West Indies =

The term British West Indies refers to the former English and British colonies and the present-day overseas territories of the United Kingdom in the Caribbean.

There have been several attempts at political unions in the history of the British West Indies. These attempts have occurred for more than 300 years, from 1627 to 1958, and were carried out, or sometimes imposed, first by the English and then the British government. During this time, some of the attempted unions were true federations of colonies and others involved attaching various colonies to a major nearby colony for the purposes of cheaper, efficient government or because the attached colonies were too small to justify a governor and administration of their own.

The initial federal attempts never went so far as to try to encompass all of the British West Indies (BWI), but were more regional in scope. The historical regional groupings were the British Leeward Islands, the British Windward Islands, and Jamaica with other nearby English/British colonies such as the Cayman Islands, British Honduras and the Turks and Caicos Islands.

== Reasons for failure of regional groupings ==
Many of the national government efforts to unify the region were met with opposition from influential groups within the various colonies, and by opposition from the wealthier colonies, Jamaica and Trinidad. In addition, the poor development of communication links and travel links among the separated island colonies contributed to the insularity and development of separate identities of each colony, even after emancipation of the slaves and more widespread participation in political life.

The British had believed that a unified federation of all states would constitute better insurance for a positive result for all after decolonisation. They worked on the strategy for over ten years, and the West Indies Federation was finally established in 1958. Unfortunately, the Jamaicans had discovered substantial deposits of bauxite in the central mountains of the island, which would have made them very prosperous. They were not willing to share this wealth with the whole Federation, and so they withdrew from it in 1962. This prompted the next wealthiest state, Trinidad, to fear that it would be left to support the others, and so it also terminated membership.

== Slavery ==
In 1823, abolitionists formed the Society for the Migration and Gradual Abolition of Slavery throughout the British Dominions to call for the emancipation of all those enslaved in the colonies. Among the Society's members were Wilberforce and the MP Thomas Fowell Buxton.

The Society worked to ensure that abolitionist candidates were elected in the general election of 1832, and the Slavery Abolition Act was passed by Parliament the following year.

This created a fund of £20 million raised by the Rothschilds to compensate the planters and established an apprenticeship system, whereby those formerly enslaved would still be bound to work for their former masters for several years.

On 1 August 1834, 750,000 slaves in the British West Indies formally became free. The apprenticeship system was unpopular among former slaves and their masters, and it was not implemented in Trinidad: Antigua and Bermuda freed their slaves immediately.

Under pressure from Westminster, the legislative assemblies in the colonies abolished the apprenticeship system, and full freedom was granted to all former slaves on 1 August 1838.

== Bahamas ==
The Bahamas' first British arrivals came from Bermuda in the 1640s and settled on the Island of Eleuthera, they are known as the Eleutheran Adventurers. By 1670 the Bahama Islands were granted to the Lord Proprietors of the province of Carolina. By the early 1700s The Bahamas was largely known as a haven for pirates, especially on the island of New Providence. Piracy became a serious concern for the British and they had acquired the Bahama Islands back from the Lord Proprietors making the Bahamas a British Crown Colony for the first time in 1717. By 1718 Woodes Rogers became the first royal governor of the Bahama Islands and by 1729 he established the House of Assembly. The Privateer business brought prosperity to the island of New Providence for the first time. Around the time of the American Revolutionary War many British Loyalist fled from main land colonies and settled in the Bahama islands bringing with them many slaves turning the black population in the Bahamas into the majority for the first time. On 10 July 1973, the Bahamas gained independence from Britain, becoming a sovereign state.

== Leeward Islands ==
=== Colonial period 1627–1816 ===
Under the Carlisle proprietorship of 1627, Barbados and the Leewards were grouped together. In practice, this arrangement was difficult to administer, and Thomas Warner governed the Leeward Islands only. In 1660 Lord Willoughby, as Governor of Barbados, also governed all of the Eastern Caribbean, then under English rule. This scheme was approved by the Leewards as they needed the military aid of Barbados at the time during the Second Anglo-Dutch War.

Otherwise, the planters on the Leewards competed with those in Barbados as rivals for the greatest share of the sugar trade with England. After the war, England gave in to the demands of the Leewards for a separate government. In 1671, the Crown assigned a governor-in-chief to manage St. Kitts, Nevis, Anguilla, Montserrat, Antigua and Barbuda.

Sir William Stapleton established the first federation in the BWI in 1674. Stapleton set up a General Assembly of the Leewards in St. Kitts. Antigua, Montserrat, Nevis and St. Kitts sent two representatives each. One governor had responsibility for the Leewards and a lieutenant governor was appointed for each island. Stapleton's Federation was active from 1674 to 1685, during his term as governor; the General Assembly met regularly until 1711. Afterwards, it only met once more in 1798. The federation was unpopular, and in 1683 the islands rejected a government proposal for one government and set of laws. By the 18th century, each island had kept its assembly and made its laws, but continued to share one governor and one attorney-general. Although unpopular, Stapleton's Federation was never really dissolved but was simply replaced by other arrangements.

=== Colonial period 1816–1869 ===
Between 1816 and 1833 the Leewards were divided into two groups, each with its governor: St. Christopher-Nevis-Anguilla and Antigua-Barbuda-Montserrat (including Redonda). In 1833, all the Leewards were brought together again under the pre-1816 and Dominica was added to the grouping until 1940.

In 1869, Governor Benjamin Pine was assigned to organize a federation of Antigua-Barbuda, Dominica, Montserrat, Nevis, St. Kitts, Anguilla, and the British Virgin Islands. St. Kitts and Nevis, however, opposed sharing their government funds with Antigua and Montserrat, which were bankrupt. Governor Pine told the Colonial Office that the scheme had failed due to "local prejudice and self-interest". Thus the only achievement was giving the Leewards a single governor. All laws and ordinances, however, had to be approved by each island council.

=== Federal colony 1871–1956 ===
In 1871, the British government passed the Leeward Islands Act through which all the islands were under one governor and one set of laws. Each island was called "Presidency" under its administrator or commissioner. Like earlier groupings, this federation was unpopular but was not dissolved until 1956 to make way for the Federation of the West Indies. The Federal Colony was composed of all islands organized under Governor Pine's previous attempt.

== Windward Islands ==
=== Colonial period 1763–1833 ===
In 1763, Barbados, as the most well established of Britain's Caribbean colonies was placed in charge of new colonies acquired in the Seven Years' War. The Governor of Barbados became Governor of Grenada and the Grenadines, St. Vincent and Tobago, with each island having its own lieutenant-governor. This arrangement was plagued with the difficulty of west to east communication among the islands in the days of sail.

=== Colonial period 1833–1958 ===
In 1833, the Windward Islands became a formal union called the Windward Islands Colony. In 1838, Trinidad (acquired in 1802) and St. Lucia (acquired in 1814) were brought into the Windward Islands Colony, but were not given their assemblies (having previously been British Crown Colonies). In 1840, Trinidad left the Colony. The Windward Islands Colony was unpopular as Barbados wished to retain its separate identity and ancient institutions, while the other colonies did not enjoy the association with Barbados (but needed such an association for defence against French invasions until 1815). Thus the individual islands resisted British attempts at closer union. Barbados in particular fought to retain its own Assembly.

This opposition to closer federation was found mainly in the upper class of society. When Governor John Pope Hennessy was sent in 1875 to Barbados to organize a closer, formal federation, there was bitter opposition from the press, the assembly of the upper-plantocracy, and a few influential coloured men. Hennessy was supported by the cane workers, who believed federation would allow them the opportunity to leave Barbados and work for higher wages or buy their plots of land elsewhere in the Windwards.

The planters and coloured merchants set up the Barbados Defence League to fight federation, which they claimed would end their representative system. In March 1876, estate labourers in southern Barbados rioted in support of the governor when he tried to force the assembly to reform prisons and hospitals. The Colonial Office then quickly transferred Hennessy to Hong Kong in 1876 and the federation plans were dropped. The Governor of Barbados remained the Governor-General of the Windwards until 1885 when Barbados left the Windward Islands Colony.

From 1885 to 1958, the Windward Islands Colony consisted of Grenada and the Grenadines, St. Vincent, and St. Lucia for the entire period. Tobago left in 1889 when she formed a union with Trinidad. Dominica joined the Windward Islands Colony in 1940 after having been transferred from the Leewards and remained in the Colony until 1958. After 1885, the Windward Islands Colony was under one governor-general in Grenada and each island had its lieutenant-governor and its assembly (as before). Attempts at a federal colony like in the Leewards were always resisted. The Windward Islands Colony broke up in 1958 when each island chose to join the new Federation of the West Indies as separate provinces.

== Jamaica and its dependencies ==
The remaining British colonies (as outlined in this section) in the Caribbean except for British Guiana and the Bahamas were grouped under Jamaica at various points in time out of convenience and sometimes for historical and/or geographical reasons. British Honduras was surrounded by hostile Spanish colonies and needed the protection afforded by the Army and Navy based in Jamaica. In addition, British Honduras had been founded by loggers and had expanded in population partly by the settlement of Englishmen arriving from Jamaica in the late 17th and early 18th centuries (with settlers also arriving from England directly or being born in the colony).

From 1742, British Honduras was a dependency directly under the Governor of Jamaica. In 1749, the Governors of Jamaica appointed superintendents for British Honduras. In 1862, British Honduras became a Crown Colony and was placed under the Governor of Jamaica with its lieutenant-governor. In 1884, it finally broke all administrative ties with Jamaica although legal appeals from British Honduras went to the Supreme Court in Jamaica even after 1884.

The Miskito Coast protectorate was overseen by the Superintendents of British Honduras and thus by extension loosely attached to Jamaica from 1749 to 1787. In 1787, Britain withdrew from the Miskito Coast (then ending administrative links with British Honduras and Jamaica) as a result of the peace agreement ending the American Revolutionary War; however, it continued to intervene in the Coast up until 1861 to protect its interests as well as the Miskito nation from Spanish encroachment.

The Bay Islands off the coast of Honduras had begun to have permanent English settlements from 1827 and after having been formally claimed by Britain in 1841 were subordinated to Jamaica in 1852 with The Governor of the Bay Islands being the Governor of Jamaica and the Superintendent of British Honduras acting as Lieutenant-Governor of the Bay Islands. This relationship existed until 1860 when the Bay Islands were ceded to Honduras.

The Cayman Islands were too small to justify a separate administration and having been settled mainly by English from Jamaica, had always been regarded as under the control of the Governor of Jamaica. In addition, the Caymans had been ceded as part of Jamaica to England from Spain in 1670 Treaty of Madrid. They were formally attached to Jamaica in 1863 and were rather like a parish of Jamaica with nominated justices of the peace and elected vestrymen in their legislature (named the Justices and Vestry). The Justices and Vestry assisted a Commissioner appointed by the Governor of Jamaica to administer the islands.

All laws passed in the Caymans had to be approved by the Governor of Jamaica. This relationship lasted until 1959. From 1959 to 1962 the Governor of Jamaica remained Governor of the Cayman Islands and had reserve powers over the islands. Also, all laws passed by the Jamaica legislature specifically for the Cayman Islands had to be enforced. Otherwise, the Cayman Islands had their own Administrator and Legislative Assembly. The final administrative link to Jamaica ceased upon Jamaica's independence in 1962 (although the Cayman Islands continued to use Jamaican currency for a further 10 years).

The Turks and Caicos Islands had in 1848 broken their association with the Bahamas due to the insufficient means of communication between the islands and the government in Nassau (this was due to the lack of major shipping routes running in that direction). Being too small to have a separate administration, the islands requested to be placed under Jamaica due to the regular communication from Kingston to the islands along the Kingston to London shipping route.

The British government agreed to this and from 1848 to 1873 the Turks and Caicos Islands were governed by superintendents/council presidents appointed from Jamaica. In 1873, the islands were then made into a dependency of Jamaica with a commissioner and a legislative board. In 1959, the islands were made more autonomous along the lines of the Cayman Islands with the Governor of Jamaica having reserve powers over the Turks and Caicos Islands. This relationship ceased when Jamaica obtained independence in 1962.

After Jamaican independence in 1962, the Cayman Islands and the Turks and Caicos Islands were made separate British dependencies, which they remain today.

== West Indies Federation ==
The West Indies Federation was a short-lived federation that existed from 3 January 1958 to 31 May 1962. It consisted of several Caribbean colonies of the United Kingdom. The expressed intention of the Federation was to create a political unit that would become independent from Britain as a single state—possibly similar to the Australian Federation, or Canadian Confederation; however, before that could happen, the Federation collapsed due to internal political conflicts.

The Federation was an internally self-governing, federal state made up of ten provinces, all British colonial possessions. The federation was created by the United Kingdom in 1958 from most of the British West Indies. Britain intended that the Federation would shortly become a fully independent state, thus simultaneously satisfying the demands for independence from all the colonies in the region. However, the project was doomed by political squabbling among the provinces, and the Federation never achieved full sovereignty, either as a Commonwealth realm or as a republic within the Commonwealth.

== See also ==
- British colonization of the Americas
- English overseas possessions in the Wars of the Three Kingdoms
- Commonwealth Caribbean
- Caricom
- Latin America–United Kingdom relations
