= English overseas possessions in the Wars of the Three Kingdoms =

Overview of certain parts of the English Civil Wars

Between 1639 and 1651 English overseas possessions were involved in the Wars of the Three Kingdoms, a series of civil wars and wars that were fought in and between England, Scotland and in Ireland.

== Americas ==
At the beginning of the war, fifty thousand Englishmen inhabited some twenty colonies in the Americas. Most of the colonies were founded in the decade prior to the start of the English Civil War (1642–1651) with the oldest existing being the Colony of Virginia (1607) and its offshoot, Bermuda (1609). The vast majority of the adult population were first generation settlers and thousands returned to the British Isles to fight or involve themselves in the politics of the Commonwealth of England (1649–1660).

Although the newer, Puritan settlements in North America, most notably Massachusetts, were dominated by Parliamentarians, the older colonies sided with the Crown. Starting with Bermuda, six colonies recognized Charles II after the regicide in 1649, including: Antigua, Barbados, Virginia, Maryland, and Newfoundland. The Parliamentarians were busy subduing Royalists in Scotland, Ireland, the Isles of Scilly, the Isle of Man, and the Channel Islands, and could not immediately force their rule on the colonies. The Virginia Company's settlements, Bermuda and Virginia (Bermuda's Independent Puritans were expelled, settling the Bahamas under William Sayle), as well as Antigua and Barbados were conspicuous in their loyalty to the Crown, and were singled out by the Rump Parliament in An Act for prohibiting Trade with the Barbadoes, Virginia, Bermuda and Antego, which was passed on 30 October 1650. This stated that the English Parliament, in order for "due punishment [to be] inflicted upon the said Delinquents",

do Declare all and every the said persons in Barbada's, Antego, Bermuda's and Virginia, that have contrived, abetted, aided or assisted those horrid Rebellions, or have since willingly joyned with them, to be notorious Robbers and Traitors, and such as by the Law of Nations are not to be permitted any maner of Commerce or Traffique with any people whatsoever; and do forbid to all maner of persons, Foreiners, and others, all maner of Commerce, Traffique and Correspondency whatsoever, to be used or held with the said Rebels in the Barbada's, Bermuda's, Virginia and Antego, or either of them.

The Act also authorised Parliamentary privateers to act against English vessels trading with the rebellious colonies: "All Ships that Trade with the Rebels may be surprized. Goods and tackle of such ships not to be embezeled, till judgement in the Admiralty.; Two or three of the Officers of every ship to be examined upon oath." A fleet was also assembled to take control of these colonies. By 1652, all were brought into line by the Commonwealth.

The new government introduced mercantilism with the first of the Navigation Acts in 1651. Soon the colonies became embroiled in the First Anglo-Dutch War (1652–1654) and the Anglo-Spanish War (1654–1660). By the Stuart Restoration, new colonies were added and the colonial population quadrupled to over two hundred thousand due to exiles, refugees, prisoners, and the Atlantic slave trade. In all the colonies that later became part of the United States, population growth throughout this period was vigorous, growing from a population of about 25,000 in 1640 to around 75,000 in 1660. The colonies also became more ethnically and religiously diverse. Another effect was the establishment of colonial assemblies in most of the colonies.

=== The Caribbean ===
Barbados, the second most populous colony, experienced a division between Royalists and Parliamentarians during the civil war. The words "Roundhead" and "Cavalier" were banned to maintain peace. After the regicide, the Royalists gained control of the colonial assembly. Lord Willoughby was appointed Governor of Barbados, by Charles II in May 1650 and he banished the Roundheads. During this time he also sent a small colonizing party to Suriname, which established Fort Willoughby (now Paramaribo) in honour of the governor. The colony, now cut off from England, relied on trading with the Dutch Republic. This became the motivation for the Navigation Act 1651.

On 25 October 1651, a seven-ship force under Commodore George Ayscue arrived off Barbados, demanding that the island submit "for the use of the Parliament of England". Willoughby's reply (tellingly addressed to "His Majesty's ship Rainbow") was unyielding, declaring that he knew "no supreme authority over Englishmen but the King". With some 400 horsemen and 6,000 militia, he was prepared to resist any attempt at coercion.

Over the next month Barbados was blockaded. Dutch ships were seized, an act which would be one of the causes of the First Anglo-Dutch War. In early December, with the Royalist cause defeated in England, Ayscue began a series of raids against fortifications on the island and was reinforced by a group of thirteen ships bound for Virginia. On 17 December a force of more than 1,000 Barbadian militia was defeated by one of Ayscue's detachments. Governor Willoughby attempted to stem the spread of Parliamentary sympathies by hanging two of the returning militia soldiers and prohibiting the reading of documents from the blockading fleet. The Royalists held out for several more weeks until one of Willoughby's own commanders, Sir Thomas Modyford the assembly speaker, declared himself for Parliament. A battle was averted by a week of rain, after which Willoughby, perhaps having seen the hopelessness of his cause, sought negotiations. He was replaced as governor, but Barbados, and the Royalists there, were not punished.

News of the fall of Barbados shocked the other Royalist colonies. Each of the other five soon capitulated without resistance when Ayscue's fleet arrived to replace their governments. Following the conquest of Scotland and Ireland by the Commonwealth, Irish prisoners, and a smaller number of Scottish and English Royalists, were sent to the islands as indentured servants, and became known as Redlegs.

In 1655, Cromwell sealed an alliance with the French against the Spanish. He sent a fleet to the West Indies under Admiral William Penn, with some 3,000 soldiers under the command of General Robert Venables, which was further reinforced in Barbados, Montserrat, St. Kitts and Nevis. Penn and Venables decided to lay siege to Santo Domingo but failed, because the Spanish had improved their defences in the face of Dutch attacks earlier in the century.

Weakened by fever, the English force then sailed west for Jamaica, the only place where the Spanish did not have new defensive works. In May 1655 they invaded at a place called Santiago de la Vega, now Spanish Town. They came, and they stayed, in the face of prolonged local resistance, reinforced by troops sent from New Spain in the Battle of Ocho Rios (1657) and the Battle of Rio Nuevo (1658). For England, Jamaica was to be the 'dagger pointed at the heart of the Spanish Empire' as it became a base for buccaneers. Cromwell, despite all difficulties, was determined that the presence should remain, sending reinforcements and supplies. Jamaica remained an English colony despite the exiled king's promise to return it to Spain in the event of his Restoration.

=== The Chesapeake Colonies and Bermuda ===
==== Background ====
The colonies of Virginia, Bermuda, and Maryland had strong Royalist sympathies, owing to their origins and demographics. Virginia, the oldest and third most populous colony, was turned into a crown colony in 1624 when the Royal charter of the Virginia Company was revoked. It was mostly high church Anglican in religion. Bermuda was originally an extension of Virginia and at the time was still administered by the Virginia Company's spin-off (or "under company"), the Somers Isles Company. Many Bermudians were Puritans, but the colony's Government and society were dominated by Royalists. After the independence of the colonies that were to form the United States, Bermuda would remain part of British North America. The much smaller Maryland was a proprietary colony founded by Roman Catholic gentry, supported by a Protestant underclass.

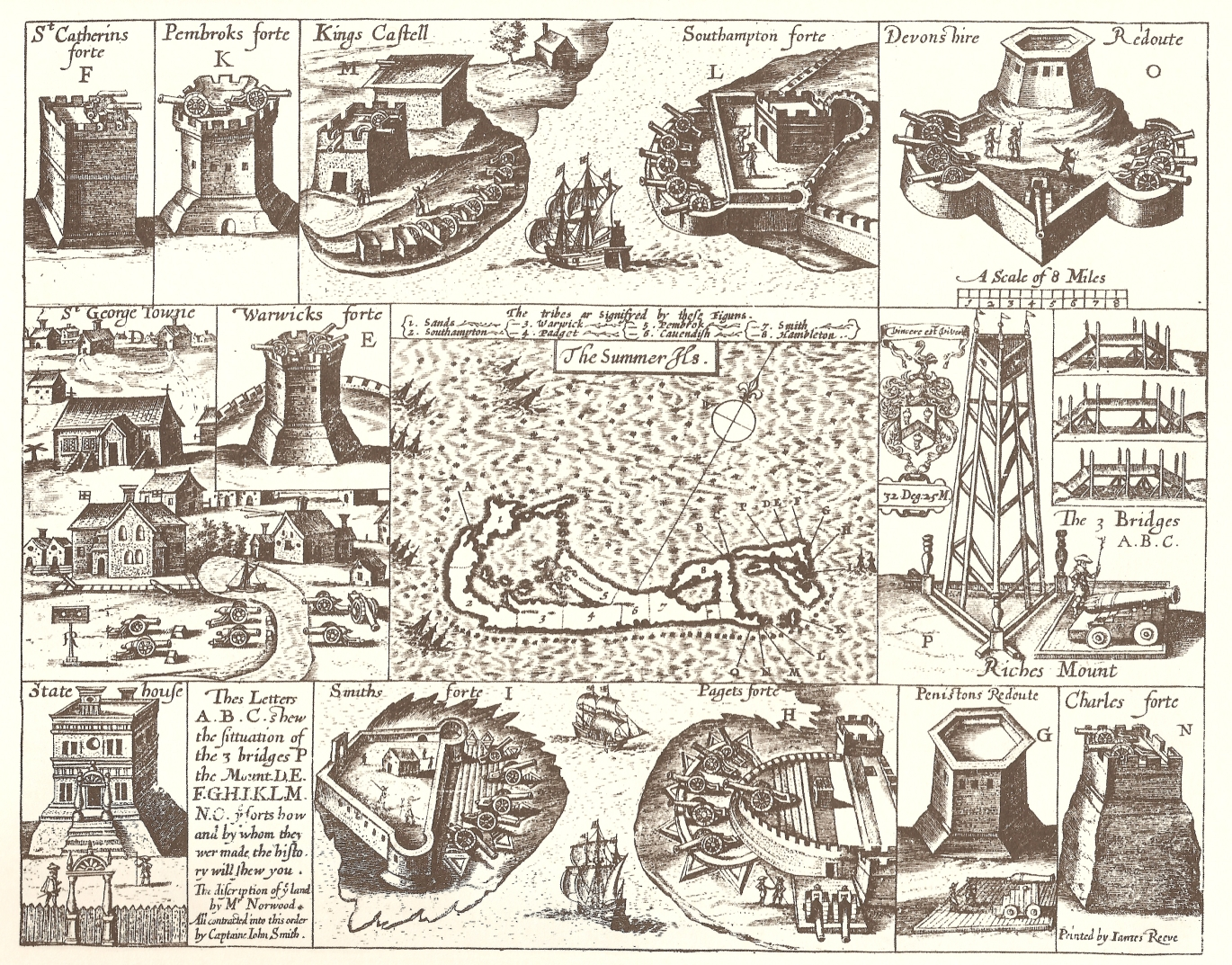
Captain John Smith's 1624 map of Bermuda, showing contemporary fortifications.

Bermuda, or the Somers Isles (originally named "Virginiola"), 640 miles from Cape Hatteras in North Carolina, had been settled in 1609 by the wreck of the Sea Venture and officially colonised as an extension of Virginia in 1612. Its administration had been transferred in 1615 to the Somers Isles Company, a spin-off of the Virginia Company, but it would retain close ties to Virginia until the American War of Independence. The Parliament of Bermuda (originally composed of a single house, the House of Assembly) was created in 1620. As virtually all of the land in Bermuda was owned by absentee landlords in England (the "Adventurers" of the Virginia and Somers Isles Companies), with most islanders being tenants or indentured servants, there was originally no property qualification to vote for the local assembly. This resulted in an Assembly that strongly reflected the interests of Bermudians, which became increasingly at odds with those of the Adventurers in England. Under the Virginia and Somers Isles Companies, the office of "Governor" was held by an absentee in London, with a "Lieutenant-Governor" (sometimes referred to as a "Deputy Governor") actually in Bermuda. When the first Lieutenant-Governor of Bermuda had been appointed by the Virginia Company in 1612 (in contrast to the company's earlier practice of dispatching governors to the colony, from the 1630s this office had been filled by a succession of prominent Bermudians), several other prominent settlers had been appointed to form an advisory privy council. With the establishment of an elected assembly, this became a legislative council, acting as both an upper house of the legislature and as a Cabinet (it is today the Senate of Bermuda). As all members of the council were ex-officio or appointed (with the Secretary of Bermuda as President), it was presumed to be more closely aligned with the interests of the Adventurers, but with those members having been appointed from the same emerging local elite class that provided candidates for election to the Assembly, it tended also to favour local interests.

Bermuda pioneered the cultivation of tobacco, but by the 1620s Virginia's tobacco industry was outproducing it and newer colonies were also adopting tobacco cultivation, driving down the profits the company earned from Bermudian tobacco. This resulted in many Adventurers selling their Bermudian land to the occupying tenants, creating a landed class in Bermuda who were technically Adventurers in the company, but who could not vote on its policies without attending its meetings in England in person. As the Bermudians attempted to redirect their colony to animal husbandry and food crops for local subsistence with the surplus increasingly exported to other colonies, they began building their own ships to deliver produce as they were otherwise reliant on the company's magazine ships (which served only to transport Bermuda's tobacco to the company in England and to return equipment and other goods for sale to Bermudians, in an attempt to give the company complete control of the economy and a profit on all imports as well as exports). The Adventurers in England, many of whom were Parliamentarians, exerted their authority to strangle Bermuda's emerging maritime industry, and the Bermudians' animosity towards the Adventurers in England consequently further acted to place them on the side of the Crown (the Somers Isles Company had tended towards the Royalist side in 1647, but was in the Parliamentary camp by 1649, and Robert Rich, 2nd Earl of Warwick, one of the major shareholders of the Somers Isles Company, was appointed Lord High Admiral of the Parliamentary navy from 1642 to 1649, and was related to Oliver Cromwell by the marriage of his grandson and heir to Cromwell's daughter). While Bermudians therefore tended towards the Royalist side, Bermuda largely escaped the effects of warfare.

From 1644 to 1646 (interrupted by a brief governorship by Captain Josias Forster, who had been loathed by the Independents), Bermuda was governed by The Triumvirate of Captain William Sayle (a prominent Bermudian who had previously been Governor from 1641 to 1642 and 1643 to 1644), Stephen Paynter, and William Wilkinson, all of whom were Independents whose rule was resented by the larger part of the population. They established a minority rule that both the Episcopalians and the Presbyterians found tyrannical, resulting in their alliance against the Independents (whereas in England the Presbyterians had allied with the Independents under Parliament against the Royalist Episcopalians).

On 14 May 1645, moderate Richard Norwood wrote to the Governor and Company in London:

I suppose it is not altogether unknowne to you that this whole country almost consisteth of two partyes, the one of those that embrace or well approve the independent way here begunne, and these doe all adhere to Mr. White as their principall (wth his peace be it spoken, as I thinke he will take no offence at it, beeing so notorious and well knowne as it is) and amongst these also seemes to be a great part of those that are truely religious; not but that there are also diverse as truely religious and as sound christians that stand out and are against it. The other party (wch is farre the greater number) is of those that hold to the former discipline here used, untill the Parliament shall order otherwise; And these for the most part adhere to an old gentleman here, who (as an understanding gentleman of this Comp. once wrote) knowes how to use them to his owne ends; And there are few in the country but seeme to adhere either to the one of these or to the other. It is my hard lott (and some others also) to have the favor of neither of them, because I cannot fully conforme to either of them; whence chiefly it hath come to passe, that I who in England scarce ever had sute against any man, or any man against me; have here scarce ever bene free from suites and troubles, though I have wronged no man".

Also in 1645, Robert Huson, Thomas Jennings and Richard Sothworth composed a "Humble Petition & Declaration of general inhabitants of the Plantation and Colony in the Somer Islands" to the Governor and Company in London accusing the Independent Governors and clergymen of "arrogating to themselves unlimited power, in seeking to draw the inhabitants of this Plantation to worship their imaginations contrary (as we conceive) to the laws of god & man", and "for our Divines declare that they are not subject to any human power; & in particular Master Copeland affirms, 'That if the King Parliament & Synod shall command any uniformity in the church, other than this, which is here set on foot by them, they will obey none". They wrote that "it is a grievance under which we groun, that the Triumvirate Government cast upon us at first & now continued procures a scorn & contempt upon us from all other Plantations, with other just exceptions which we omit, but especially that you have by the continuance of Government put upon us a yoke insupportable", and "you have continued such Governors, two of which have submitted to the Independent Covenant and have set up a Supreme Governor in their Church, that will neither wait upon King or Keyser (in their own words)".

To end the strife in the colony, the Somers Isles Company, in 1645, appointed Captain Thomas Turner, reputed a moderate, as Lieutenant-Governor (the office of "Governor" was held at the time by Lord High Admiral Robert Rich, the Earl of Warwick). Turner arrived at Bermuda in April, 1646. Royalist John Vaughan was appointed Secretary, replacing Henry Smith, on 25 April 1646, and Independents were removed from Government. The Independents found Turner as objectionable as the Royalists had the Triumvirate.

In June, 1646, Captain William Sayle and William Golding, who had been an Independent preacher to the congregation in Bermuda, went to London to present a petition by Bermuda's Independents to the High Court of Parliament, "that your Petitioners may not languish under an usurped power; nor the power and honour of Parliament be trampled on, by the vilest of our English Nation". The Petitioners' complaints were not only against local Royalists, but also against the predatory commercial practices of, and interference by, the Somers Isles Company.

Turner was accused, in Golding's 1648 pamphlet "Servants on horse-back" (containing the 1646 petition to Parliament), of maintaining the military against local Independents even while having little concern of a foreign threat:

Fourthly, no considerable quantity of Ammunition and Armes, to secure so considerable a Garrison. And all the use the Ammunition serveth to (for present) is to keep in awe the Independents; for when Captaine Sayle was in the Harbour, with a small ship, with some twenty men Captaine Turner kept a guard, pretending feares, but when a Spanish ship was wrackt, and a hundred of Souldiers, & Sea-men came a shoar; and most of the Inhabitants of ability gone aboard, no appearance of a guard.* Captaine Turner had another game in chase, the nine Hogs-heads of corne paid him by the Country for the former guard, is a trifle to what he rakes now from the Spaniards, with-out regard of justice or civility. *But dismist the guard before the pretence of Fear was removed.

The event Golding described took place in October, 1647, when Sayle arrived with "diuers passengers, And vppon information had of store of armes and ammunicon wch they had on board". Sayle delivered letters from Parliament and the Somers Isles Company, and addressed the Governor and Council at John Trimingham's house, advising that in London he had found religious toleration, and that the "Episcopall ministers did preach, the presbitterians did preach, and the Independents did teach, And where the presbitterians taught he could neuer find above a half score people, but all the rest constantly full and then he proceeded howe he had obtained free trade for the Inhabitants here, and being required to showe his warrant for it he said that some of the company opposed it, but he left his lawer to try it with them, and that my Lord of warwicke had bin for it this 18 yeares". With no official document to support his assertion regarding free trade, Governor Turner told him "it is contrary to our commission and our oath, the wch I will maintain inviolable by Gods assistance soe longe as I haue to do with the gournment".

A Somers Isles Company magazine ship, which had left England before the King's 30 January 1649 execution, arrived at Bermuda in March, 1649, bearing news of the King's impending trial. It also bore instructions from the Company stripping Captain Thomas Turner of the office of Governor and ordering that the colony be governed by a triumvirate composed of Richard Norwood, Captain Leacraft (also spelt "Leicroft"), and William Wilkinson. However, Leacraft had died before the instructions arrived, Wilkinson was a "strong Independent", "obnoxious to the dominant Church faction" in the Council and the House of Assembly, and "was not permitted by them to exercise his commission", and Norwood would not accept his own commission without Wilkinson. Captain Turner, Captain Josias Forster, and Roger Wood (all three having formerly held the office of Governor) were put forward as candidates for the Governorship, which was voted upon by the other members of the council. Although Captain Richard Jennings and the Sheriff both voted for Wood, the others all voted for Turner, who reluctantly resumed the office. Turner was too moderate for most of the Royalist party, however.

==== Reaction to the death of King Charles I ====
News of the execution of King Charles I reached Bermuda by July, and a proposition was made to the Governor and Council by "the Country" (analogous to the Royalist party in the House of Assembly) at a meeting on 5 July 1649:

Wee uppon sufficient grounds reports and circumstances are convinced that our Royall Souraigne Charles the first is slaine wch horrid act wee defie and detest and unwillinge to have our conscience stained with the breach of the oath (to) our god and to avoide fallinge into a premunire, acknowledge the high-borne Charles prince of Wales to be the undobted heire apparent to the kingdomes of great Brittan ffrance and Ireland wee desire the said prince accordinge to his birthright may speedily be proclaymed

2ndly. Wee desire that the oath of alledgeance and supremacy may be forthwith administerd to all people in these Islands who are capable thereof without exception and if any shall deny the taking of the said oathes or by any manner of practice whatsoever transgress against either the ptie or p.ties beinge Lawfully convict thereof, to be speedily punished accordinge as the Lawes of our nation hath provided in such cases

3rdly. Wee desire that all manner of psons whatsoever Inhabiting these Islands may accordinge to the Lawes of our nation be comanded vniformitie In matters of Church Govmt And uppon refusall of conformity to be proceeded against as our Lawes in that case hath provided

Wee desire these our Just demands and Requests may be putt into speedy execution

The answer of the Governor and Council to the Country's proposition was to make Bermuda the first colony to recognize Charles II as King, and included:

give our heartie thanks for your loyaltie to the kinge and Crown of Englande wee doe acknowledge the high-born Charles Prince of Wales to be heir to the crowne and kingdome of England Scotland ffrance and Ireland after the decease of his royal father and we doe hereby declare and utter, we detest and dissent that horrid Act of Slayinge his Majtie and by the oath wch wee have taken, wee shall beare faith and alleadgiance to the Lawfulle Kinge of England his heirss and successors.

On 20 August 1649, Governor Turner ordered a proclamation to be drawn up and published (dated 21 August) requiring that, as various persons in the colony had "taken the oath of supremacy and alleadgiance vunto his matie the Lawfull kinge of England and yet neuertheles they contrarye to theire oathes doe deny conformity to the lawes and Government here established", all such persons who refused conformity to the Government in both the church and state could expect no protection by virtue of any former power or order, and would face prosecution.

Turner's governorship would end after Mr. Whetenhall, in the name of the Country, impeached the Reverend Nathaniel White of the Puritan party for being an enemy of the King, Company, and country. A warrant was issued for White's arrest. On 25 September 1649, the Council and Country met at the home of John Trimingham after "the party in arms called 'The Country'" had arrested White under the aforementioned warrant, along with most of the Independents (who had been imprisoned in the house of a Mrs. Taylor). The Country exhibited articles against Governor Turner. Although the Council deemed the articles not to be grounds for his displacement, the Country was insistent against Turner, who therefore resigned the office of Governor. The Country then put forward John Trimingham and Thomas Burrows to the Council as candidates for Turner's replacement. The Council members elected Trimingham. On Thursday, 27 September 1649, "the Army brought downe the new Gour and he tooke his oathe in the Church according to the usuall forme and vppon ffryday they marched awaye out of the towne (of St Georges) into the mayne".

Many of the island's defeated Puritans were forced to emigrate, settling in the Bahamas as the Eleutheran Adventurers under the leadership of William Sayle.

The Royalists in Bermuda, with control of the army (nine companies of militia and the complements of the coastal forts), were confident in Bermuda's natural and man-made defences, including a barrier reef and numerous fortified coastal artillery batteries. The Parliamentary government, however, believed the defences weak and formed plans to capture the colony.

On 18 December 1649, the Earl of Pembroke, Colonel Purefoy, Sir William Constable, the Earl of Denbigh, Lord Whitelocke, Colonel Wanton, and Mr. Holland were appointed by the Council of State, with any three or more of them to be a committee with authority to examine the business of Bermuda. The Council of State Orders for 1 January 1650, lists:

(17) That the following Reports brought in from the Comttee Appointed for the business of the Summers Island bee approved of vizt:

(18) That the Government of the Summers Island bee setled on Capt Foster, and his Councell, as already is appointed by ye Company

(19) That all Captaines and Commanders of the Forts and Castles within ye said Island, bee nominated and appointed, by ye said Governour wth the Consent of this Councell.

(20) That the said Governour and Councell, doe choose another Secretary in ye place of Vaughan if they see cause;

That the Gouernour and all other officers of Trust doe take the Engagmt according to ye order of Parliament.

That Imediatly after the Settlement of the said Governer and ye Councell, ye persons of Capt Turner, late Governour and Mr Viner the Minister bee secured, and upon Examinations and proofes taken concerning the Crimes and misdemeanours wch are informed against them, they bee forthwith sent over to England togeather wh ye said Examination & proofe.

These instructions and Forster's commission arrived in Bermuda on 29 May 1650. Although the Country made charges against Forster and Captain Jennings on learning of this, demanding their charges be answered before the commission read, and many members of the Council "denied to take notice of it because the l'tre was not directed to them with the Gour as here to fore", but eventually it was agreed to read it, and Forster was accepted as Governor.

The following day, Trimingham, Mr. Miller, Captain Jennings, and Mr. Morgan accepted the oaths of Councillors. Richard Norwood, Mr. Berkeley, and Mr. Wainwright refused. Mr. Deuitt "would not accept because the company deserted him".

Despite accepting the instructions from London on the matter of the new appointments, the Government of Bermuda remained Royalist.

The Reverend Mr. Hooper informed the Council that a ship under the command of Captain Powell, with Commissioners Colonel Rich, Mr. Hollond, Captain Norwood, Captain Bond, and a hundred men aboard, was prepared to seize Bermuda.

The Act prohibiting trade with Bermuda and the other colonies considered in rebellion was passed on 3 Oct 1650.

In Bermuda, tailors Thomas Walker of Paget and George Washington of Hamilton were tried at the Assizes held from the 11 to 22 November 1650, on charges of being traitors against "our Soveraigne Lord the Kinge".

When it was rumoured in Bermuda in 1650 that a new governor was to be sent to the colony, militia officer Lieutenant Michael Burrows told Independent John Somersall that he might not be permitted to land. Somersall said he would venture his life to bring him in, and that the Independents were not altogether fools, for though they were disarmed, there were yet "other armes besides guns and bullets".

==== Capture of Barbados ====
Admiral Sir George Ayscue, in command of the task force sent in 1651 by Parliament to capture the Royalist colonies, received additional instructions from Whitehall (dated 13 February 1651) addressed to him and the other Commissioners, instructing "as well to take Care for the reducemt of Bermuda's Virginia & Antego, as of the Island of Barbada's"; "In the case that (through the blessing of God upon yor endeavors) you shall be able to recover the Island of Barbada's unto its due subjection to this Comonwealth or after you have used your utmost dilligence to effect the same. If that you finde yorselves in a Capacity to send one or more of yo ships for the reduceing of any or all of the other plantacons to the like obedience. You are hereby Authorized and required soe to doe. And you are to make yor attempt upon the Island of Bermuda's, wch it is informed may without much strength or difficulty be gained or upon any the other plantacons now in defection as your Intelligence and opportunity shall serve". The instructions also specified that the officer in command of the force that captured a colony should then become its Governor, "But if either Care of the Fleet wth you or any othar important publiq service, will not admit of his Continuance there, to exercise the office & Comand of Governor thereof then it shall be lawfull for him the said Comr or commandrs in chiefe to depute & Constitute William Wilkinson of the Island of Bermudas or some other able and faithfull person to be Governor there, and to appoint such & soe many well affected & discreet persons to be a Councell for his Assistance as he thinks fit".

Barbados would surrender on 13 January 1652, but no attempt would be made to test Bermuda's defences. At a meeting of the Governor and Council on 25 February 1652 (at which were present Governor Forster, Council members Captain Roger Wood, Captain Richard Jennings, Captain Thomas Turner, Captain William Seymour, Mr. Stephen Painter, Mr. William Wilkinson, Mr. John Miller, Mr. William Berkeley, Mr. Richard Norwood, and Secretary Anthony Jenour), a Generall Letter received from the company was read, which instructed them to engage to the Commonwealth of England "as yt is now established without a kinge or House of Lordes", which engagement was given and a proclamation ordered by the Governor explaining and commanding all inhabitants of Bermuda to take the same engagement when it should be tendered unto them.

==== Virginia ====
Meanwhile, the Virginia colonists were battling for their survival in a war against the Powhatans (1644–1646) which saw a tenth of the colonial population killed in the initial massacre. Royalist propaganda accused the Roundheads of stirring up the natives, and Governor William Berkeley expelled all the Puritans from the colony in 1647. After Virginian victory, Maryland Governor Leonard Calvert returned to Maryland in 1646 and recaptured St. Mary's City.

Following the death of Leonard Calvert in 1647, in 1649 Cecil Calvert named William Stone, a Protestant, as governor. By choosing Stone, Calvert could avoid the criticism that Maryland was a seat of Popery where Protestants were allegedly oppressed. Stone and his council, however, were required to agree not to interfere with freedom of worship, and in 1649, the colonial assembly passed the Maryland Toleration Act ensuring freedom of religion within Maryland.

After the regicide, Virginia remained faithful to the House of Stuart, although Parliament had decreed that support for Charles II was treason. Berkeley also invited the king to Virginia. The issue of which side Maryland stood on was finally settled, at least in appearance, when Thomas Greene, deputy to Stone and a Roman Catholic, declared on 15 November 1649, that Charles II was the "undoubted rightfull heire to all his father's dominions". All acts taken by the Maryland Assembly would further require an oath of fidelity to Baltimore as "Lord Proprietor".

In March 1652 the Rump Parliament removed Stone and Berkeley as governors of Maryland and Virginia; Richard Bennett replaced Berkeley, but Stone was reinstated in June. On 2 March 1654, Stone decreed that although he was faithful to the Commonwealth, all writs should "run in the Proprietary's name as heretofore". On 3 January 1654, the exiled Virginian Puritans who had settled at Stone's invitation in Providence objected to the oath as Baltimore was a Catholic. On 20 July 1654, Stone resigned as governor under duress and fled to Virginia. Parliamentary commissioners became de facto governors of the colony, and the first General Assembly under their authority was held on 20 October 1654. Roman Catholics and any other individuals who had borne arms against the Parliament could not be members (effectively limiting the membership to Puritans), and among the 44 Acts passed by this group was a repeal of the Toleration Act, and another that forbade Roman Catholics from practising their faith.

After the death of Governor Samuel Matthews, Virginia's House of Burgesses reelected the royalist William Berkeley in 1659. Thus, in the view of historian Robert Beverley, Jr. writing in 1705, the Virginia colony "was the last of all the King's Dominions that submitted to the Usurpation, and afterwards the first that cast it off". Many of the First Families of Virginia trace their founding to this time period and not the actual first days of the colony. As a reward for its loyalty, Charles II gave Virginia the epithet "Old Dominion". He awarded a group of his faithful supporters the rights to found a new colony just south of Virginia, to be called Carolina after his father (its capital would be called Charleston). This was established by a nucleus of Bermudian families and new emigrants from England, who sailed from Bermuda under the same Independent William Sayle who had led the Parliamentarian and Puritan exiles from Bermuda to the Bahamas during the war.

==== Maryland ====
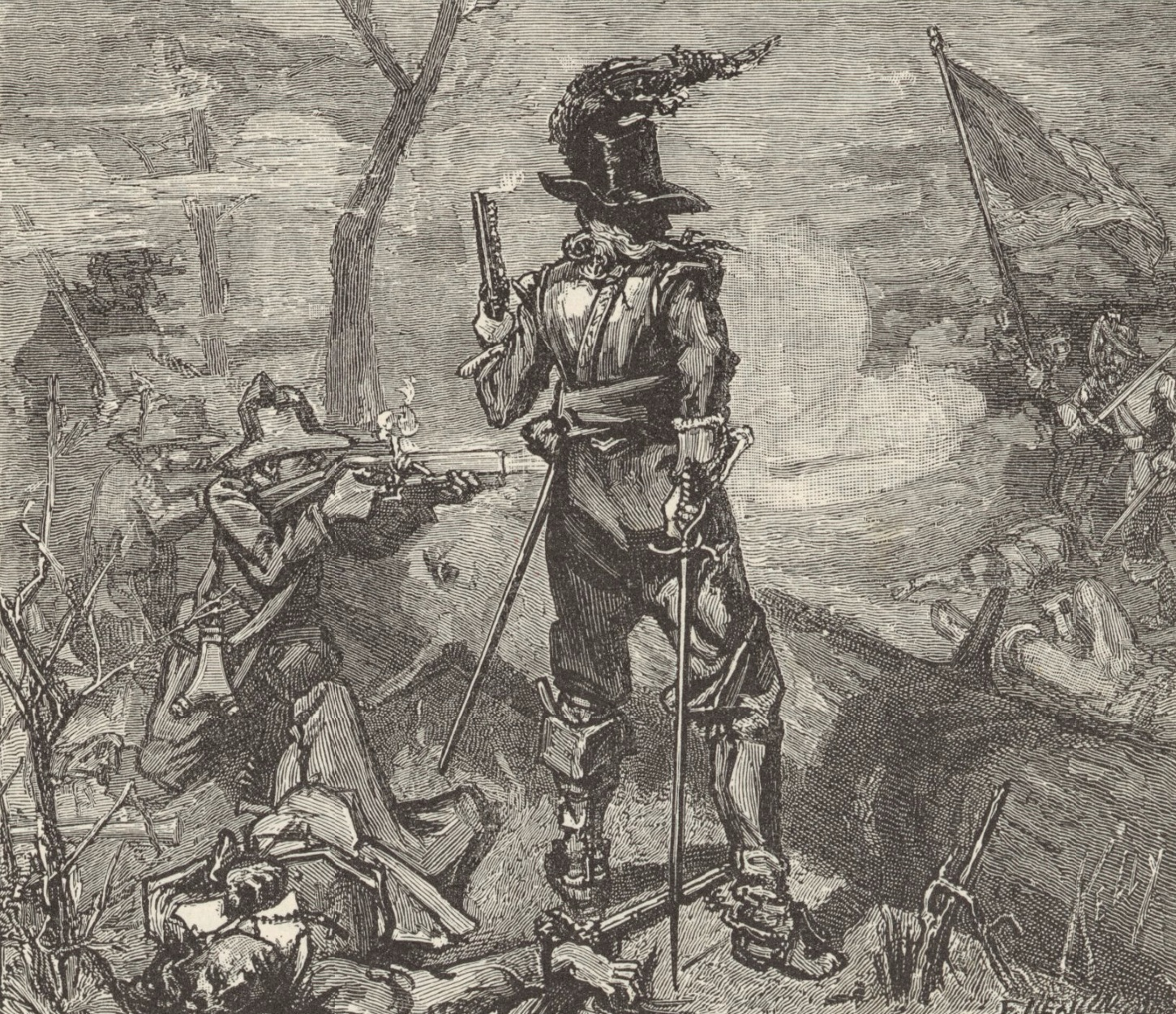
The Battle of the Severn, the last engagement of the Wars of the Three Kingdoms

In April 1643, aware of the problems besetting the home country, Governor Leonard Calvert departed Maryland to consult with his brother, Proprietor Cecil Calvert, 2nd Baron Baltimore. During this time, St. Mary's City was visited by Captain Richard Ingle, a Roundhead, who led a rebellion upon Leonard Calvert's return. In September 1644, Ingle captured St. Mary's City, and William Claiborne captured Kent Island, forcing Calvert to seek refuge in Virginia. What followed became known as the Plundering Time, a nearly two-year period when Ingle and his companions roamed the colony, robbing at will and taking Jesuits back to England as prisoners.

=== Northern Colonies ===
From 1630 through 1640, approximately 20,000 Puritans emigrated to New England in a Great Migration. In 1642, after the English Civil War began, a sixth of the male colonists returned to England to fight for Parliament, and many stayed, since Oliver Cromwell was himself a Puritan. In 1643, most of the colonies formed the New England Confederation, a defensive alliance. In the early years of the Commonwealth, there was a pamphlet war on whether England should model itself after its Puritan colonies. The non-Puritan factions successfully convinced Cromwell to go for religious toleration lest there be mutiny in the New Model Army.

In 1637, Puritan controversialist Anne Hutchinson purchased land on Aquidneck Island from the Native Americans, settling in Pocasset, now known as Portsmouth, Rhode Island. With her came William Coddington and John Clarke, among others. Other neighboring settlements of refugees followed, which all formed a loose alliance. They sought recognition together as an English colony in 1643, in response to threats to their independence. The revolutionary Long Parliament in London granted a charter in March 1644. The colonists refused to have a governor, but set up an elected "president" and council.

Royalist Newfoundland fishermen, with the support of Prince Rupert, fought sea skirmishes with New Englanders until Newfoundland Governor David Kirke was arrested by his replacement John Treworgie in 1651. The sparsely populated high church Anglican Province of Maine was annexed by the more populous Massachusetts Bay Colony in 1652 as the County of Yorkshire.

In 1654, the New England Confederation voted to invade New Netherland to support the Commonwealth during the First Anglo-Dutch War. Massachusetts refused to join, which severely undermined the Confederation. Cromwell sent naval reinforcements but the war ended while they were organizing their forces. This expedition was retooled to target Nova Scotia, the former Scottish colony that had been ceded to the French as part of Acadia years earlier by Charles I. Cromwell claimed the Treaty of Suza and Treaty of Saint-Germain were invalid and that the French did not pay the purchase money. Nova Scotia was taken without significant resistance by Robert Sedgwick. This became an international incident since England and France were at peace but the French were busy fighting the Spanish and ceded the territory to England to secure the Commonwealth as an ally. England returned it to France in 1670 in compliance with the 1667 Treaty of Breda.

After the Restoration, there was a Fifth Monarchist uprising in London led by New Englander Thomas Venner. This was used in Royalist propaganda to unfairly blame all the upheaval of the last two decades on New England. It was not helped by the fact that the New Haven colony sheltered several regicides. New Haven was merged with the Connecticut Colony as punishment. New England as a whole remained the hotbed of Puritanism where sentiments for the 'Good Old Cause' against the 'Norman yoke' simmered until the Glorious Revolution.

== India ==
During this period, the East India Company operated factories in Bantam, Surat, and Fort St George (Chennai). The Commonwealth was not sympathetic to the company, seeing it as a relic of the Stuart era. The First Anglo-Dutch War severely damaged the fortunes of the company as it had a weaker military presence in the Indian Ocean compared to its rival, the Dutch East India Company. In 1654, the Company lost its monopoly charter. Cromwell renewed the charter in 1657 and granted the EIC the right to govern the South Atlantic island of Saint Helena.

== See also ==
- Restoration in the English colonies
- English overseas possessions
- British colonization of the Americas
