= Somers Isles Company =

English chartered company that controlled Bermuda

The Somers Isles Company (fully, the Company of the City of London for the Plantacion of The Somers Isles or the Company of The Somers Isles) was formed in 1615 to operate the English colony of the Somers Isles, also known as Bermuda, as a commercial venture. It held a royal charter for Bermuda until 1684, when it was dissolved, and the Crown assumed responsibility for the administration of Bermuda as a royal colony.

== Bermuda under the Virginia Company ==
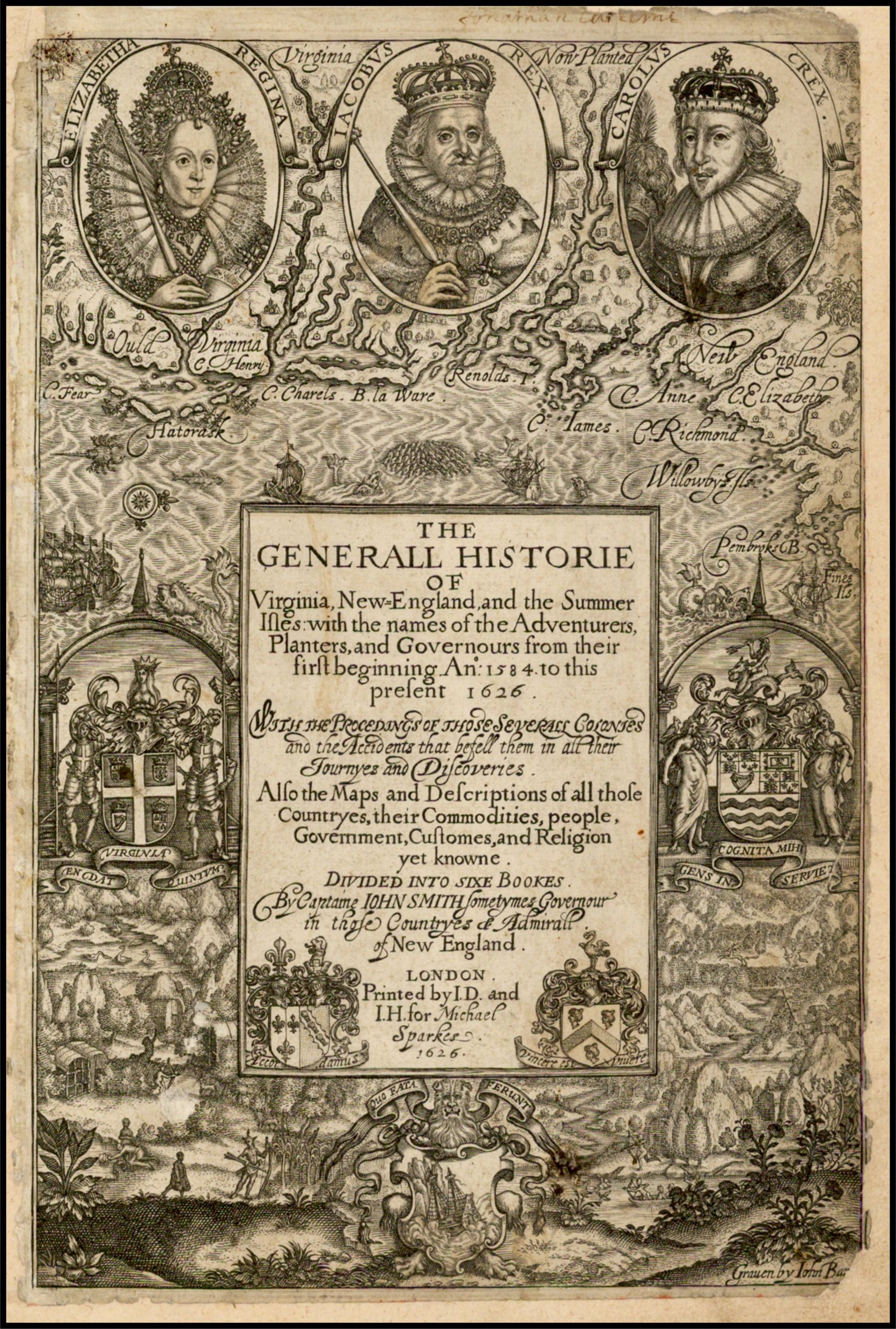
"The Generall Historie of Virginia, New-England, and the Summer Isles", by Captain John Smith

Bermuda had been settled, inadvertently, in 1609 by the Virginia Company when its flagship, Sea Venture, was wrecked on the reefs to its east. The Admiral of the company, Sir George Somers, was at the helm as the ship fought a storm that had broken apart a relief fleet destined for Jamestown, the Virginian settlement established by the Company two years earlier. Somers had deliberately driven the ship onto the reefs to prevent its foundering, thereby saving all aboard.

The settlers and seamen spent ten months in Bermuda while they built two new ships to continue the voyage to Jamestown. During the building, Sea Venture's longboat was fitted with a mast and sent to find Jamestown. Neither it, nor its crew, was ever seen again. When Deliverance and Patience set sail for Jamestown, they left several of the original party behind to maintain Somers' claim to the islands for England, as well as some dead. Those aboard the two ships included Sir Thomas Gates, the military commander and future governor of Jamestown, William Strachey, whose account of the wrecking may later have inspired Shakespeare's The Tempest, and John Rolfe, who would found Virginia's tobacco industry, and who left a wife and child buried in Bermuda. Rolfe would find a new bride in the Powhatan princess Pocahontas.

Jamestown, and the sixty survivors of its original five hundred settlers, were found in such a poor state that it was decided to abandon the Jamestown settlement and return everyone to England. The timely arrival of another relief fleet under Thomas West from England granted the colony a reprieve. However, the food shortage was made more critical by the new arrivals. Somers returned to Bermuda on Patience, captained by his nephew, Matthew, to gather provisions for the Jamestown colony, but died on Bermuda in 1610. Matthew Somers was keen to receive his inheritance (Sir George and his wife were childless, but had raised his two nephews), and took Patience to Somers' hometown, Lyme Regis, and not to Virginia.

When news reached England of the adventures of Sea Venture's survivors, the royal charter of the Virginia Company was extended to include Bermuda on the 12th of March, 1612, at Westminster, with the archipelago granted by the Crown unto the Treasurer and Company of Aduenturers and Planters of the Cittie of London for the first colony in Virginia. The new colony was officially named Virgineola, although this was soon changed to The Somers Isles or The Somers Islands in honour of Sir George Somers.

A Governor, Richard Moore, arrived in 1612 with settlers, aboard Plough, to join those left behind by Sea Venture, Patience, and Deliverance. The new settlers were primarily tenant farmers, who gave seven years of indentured servitude to the Company in exchange for the cost of transport. Although the primary industry was envisioned to be agriculture, the early Governors enthusiastically, if mostly unsuccessfully, attempted to develop other industries also. These included pearl diving (there are no pearls in Bermuda) and ambergris. The first two slaves to arrive in Bermuda, one black, one Native American, were brought in for their skills as pearl divers.

Free of the endemic warfare and other hardships which plagued the continental settlement, Bermuda thrived from the beginning, though it was never to be particularly profitable for its investors. Its population quickly surpassed that of Jamestown, and consideration was given to abandoning the North American continent and evacuating its settlers to Bermuda.

== Formation of the Somers Isles Company ==
The Virginia Company ran Bermuda until 1613, when the colony was transferred to Sir William Wade et al in exchange for £2,000, who then resigned it to the Crown in 1614. The Crown briefly administered the Colony directly before the adventurers (shareholders) of the Virginia Company formed a second company, the Somers Isles Company, to which Bermuda was transferred in 1615. The Virginia Company was dissolved in 1622, with the administration of its continental colony passing to the Crown. The Somers Isles Company, with its separate charter, continued to administer Bermuda for another six decades.

The original Adventurers of the Somers Isles Company listed in the letters patent were essentially the same as those of the Virginia Company. Major-General Sir John Henry Lefroy, Governor of Bermuda from 1871 to 1877, transcribed the list which was ordered by social rank, but commented that the original list began with Henry, Earl of Southampton:

- Bedford, Lucie, Countess of
- Cavendish, William, Lord
- William, Lord Paget
- Pembroke, William, Earl of
- Southampton, Henrie, Earl of
- Auger (Aucher) Sir Anthoine
- Cranfield, Sir Lionel
- Diggs, Sir Dudlie
- Grobham, Sir Richard
- Hide, Sir Lawrence
- Hogan, Sir Thomas
- Howard, Sir John
- Mansell, Sir Richard (Robert)
- Mericke, Sir John
- Rich, Sir Robert
- Sandys, Sir Edwin
- Sandys, Sir Samuel
- Smith, Sir Richard
- Smith, Sir Thomas
- Watts, Sir John
- Winwood, Sir Ralphe
- Caraway, William Esq.
- Chamberlaine, Richard Esq.
- Heydon, Jeremie Esq.
- Hide, Nicholas Esq.
- Martin, Richard Esq.
- Thorpe, George Esq.
- Walter, John Esq.
- Westenholm, John Esq.
- Wrath, John Esq.
- Abbott, Maurice, merchant
- Abby, Anthony
- Adderlie, William
- Anthonie, Charles, goldsmith
- Banks, John, mercer
- Barnard, John
- Barkeley, George, merchant
- Baron, Christopher
- Benson, Nicholas
- Bretton, John
- Bishop, Edward
- Brainfield, Arthur
- Campage, William, merchant
- Cartwright, Abraham
- Casewell, Richard
- Chamberlaine, Abraham
- Chamberlaine, George, merchant
- Church, Thomas
- Clitherow, Christopher
- Cotton, Allen
- Conell, Thomas
- Dawes, Abraham
- De Laurie, Gideon
- Delbridge, John
- Dike, John
- Ditchfield, Edward, salter
- Edwards, Richard
- Etheridge, George
- Exton, Nicholas
- Farrer, Nicholas, merchant
- Ffellgate, William
- Fletcher, John
- Fletcher, Edward
- Gearing, John
- Giles, Ffrancis
- Gore, Robert, merchant tailor
- Greenwell, William, merchant tailor
- Haleman, George
- Hamer, Ralphe, merchant taylor
- Harwood, Leonard
- Herne, John
- Heyward, John, clarke
- Hinton, Anthonie, doctor of physicke
- Hodges, John
- Jacobson, Philip
- Jadwin, Thomas
- John, Thomas
- Johnson, Robert, grocer
- Kerell, John
- Kinge, Ralphe
- Leuis, Thomas
- Lukin, Edward
- Maplesdon, Richard
- Martin, Edward
- Mercer, Richard
- Nicholls, William
- Norcott, Thomas
- Offley, Robert, merchant
- Osborn, John
- Palmer, William
- Payne, William Esquire
- Phipps, Robert
- Poulson, Richard
- Prason, Hildebrand
- Quick, William
- Rich, George
- Roberts, Elias, merchant tailor
- Rogers, Richard
- Scott, Edmon
- Scott, George
- Shepheard, Matthew
- Smith, Cleophas
- Smith, George, grocer
- Smith, Robert
- Smith, Waren
- Speckhardie, Abraham
- Swinow, George
- Tomlins, Richard
- Tymberdale, Henry
- Wale, Thomas
- Webb, Rice, haberdasher
- Webb, Thomas
- Webster, William
- Weld, John
- Welby, William, stationer
- West, John, grocer
- Wheatley, Thomas
- Woddall, John

== Bermuda as a company colony ==
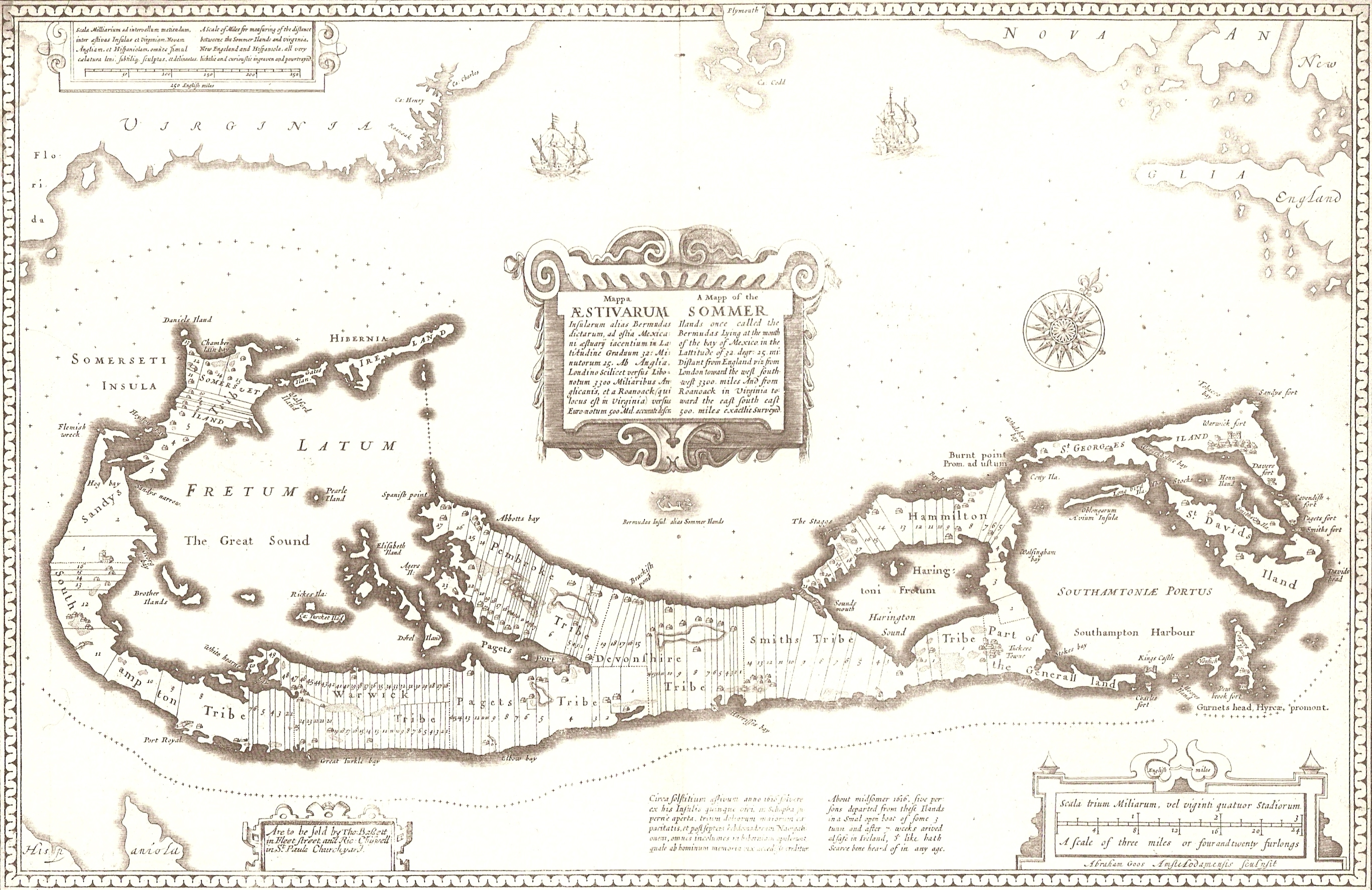
Map by John Speed, 1676.

Most of Bermuda was subdivided into eight equally sized tribes, later called parishes. These were named for shareholders in the Company, and were further divided (by tribe roads) into lots which equated to shares in the Company. The Company's return on investment came specifically from cash crops raised on that land. A ninth subdivision, now the easternmost parish, was Saint George's, comprising Saint George's Island, Saint David's Island, part of the Main Island, and various smaller islands and islets around Castle Harbour (then known as Southampton Harbour) and Saint George's Harbour. This area was held as common, or King's land, and was not subdivided for exploitation by the Company. This was where the capital, Saint George's Town was located. The choice of this location followed the original settlement created by Sea Venture survivors, and was also determined by the two eastern harbours being the only ones then readily accessible to shipping.

A surveyor, Richard Norwood, was hired to produce a survey of the colony, which also served as a census. This was completed in 1616, although he made later updates. In the process, he discovered that the total landmass of the eight commercial parishes was greater than originally estimated. His superior, Daniel Tucker, the Governor of Bermuda, appropriated a choice piece of land, equivalent to the excess, for himself.

== Local government ==
The Company continued to appoint governors until its dissolution in 1684. In 1620, however, a colonial parliament was created, the House of Assembly. Suffrage was restricted to male land owners, and there was no upper house. An appointed council, composed primarily from the leading merchant families of the Colony, came to fill a role similar to both an upper house, and a cabinet, and often proved the true repository of power in Bermuda.

The immediate concern of the first governors was for the colony's protection from a feared Spanish or Dutch attack, and the building of fortifications, and the raising of militias, was sustained throughout the company's administration, and beyond. A review of the colony's defences was carried out by Captain John Smith.

== Demographics and immigration ==
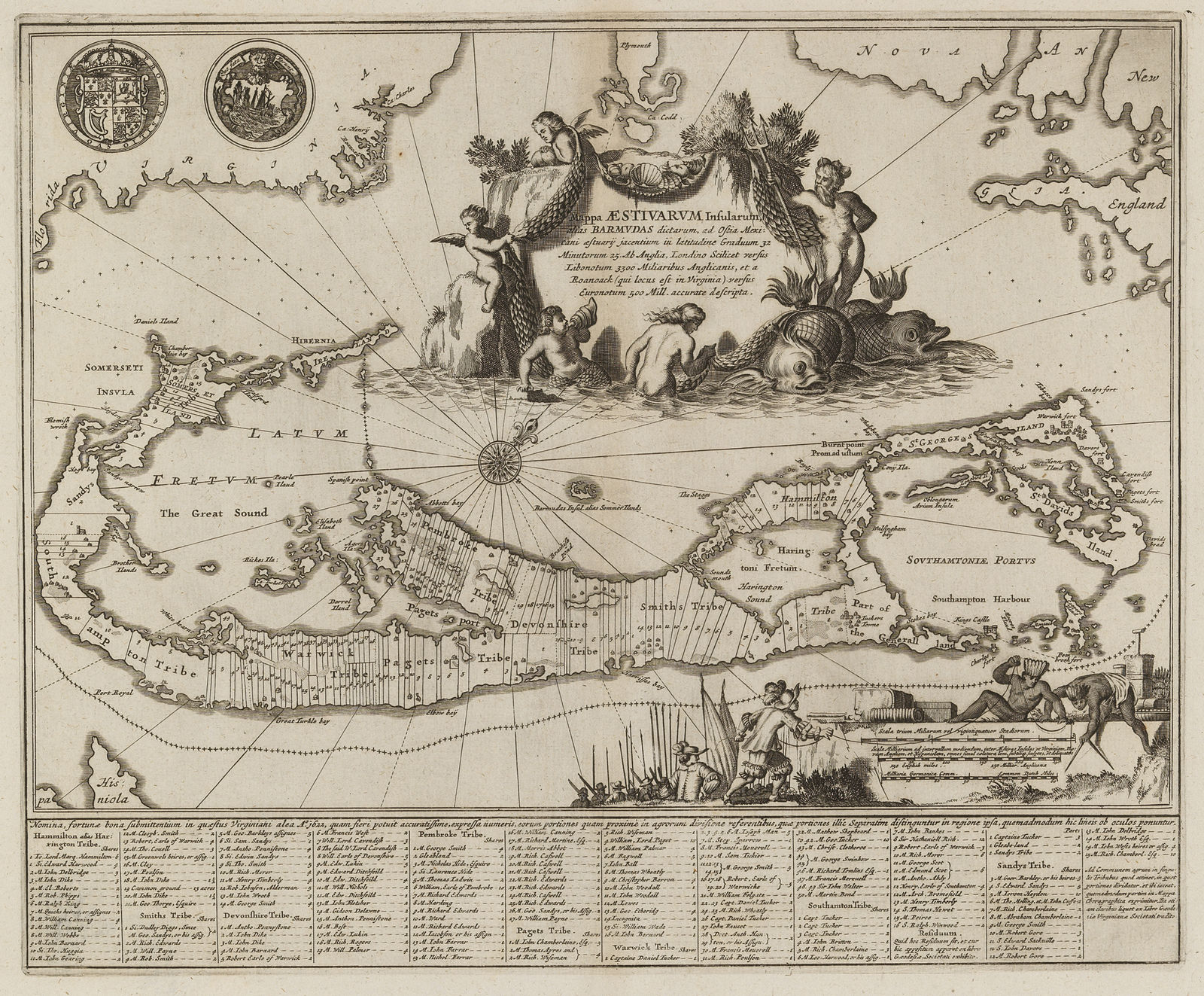
The map first published in 1622, from the 1616 to 1622 First Survey of the Somers Isles (alias Bermuda) by Richard Norwood, for the Company of the City of London for the Plantacion of The Somers Isles

The immigration of European indentured servants underpinned the Bermudian economy during the Company's administration over the island, and this source of cheap labour meant that Bermuda never adopted a slavery-based economic system which came to characterise other European colonies in the West Indies. Though the majority of the Bermudian population was of English descent, a number of other ethnic groups were brought to Bermuda during the Company's administration; the first group being Irish and Scottish indentured servants, with both groups primarily consisting of prisoners of war captured during the Wars of the Three Kingdoms (including the Cromwellian conquest of Ireland).

The second group were Native Americans from North America who were brought to Bermuda as slaves after being sold into slavery in the aftermath of various conflicts in colonial New England such as the Pequot War and King Philip's War. The third group were Africans; though a few were free people of colour from Spanish America, the majority were imported by European slave traders as part of the transatlantic slave trade. A rapid influx of Africans to Bermuda during the 17th century led to the white majority becoming uneasy, and resulted in the terms of indenture for African indentured servants to be raised from seven to ninety-nine years.

After the outbreak of the English Civil War (1642–1651), Bermuda remained sympathetic towards the Royalist cause, perhaps due to the fact that the shareholders of the Somers Isles Company consisted primarily of wealthy members of the upper-class. Despite the Royalist defeat during the conflict, Bermuda was largely spared the effects and aftermath of the Parliamentarian victory. Supporters of the Parliamentarians in Bermuda, which like their counterparts in England were similar to the Puritan and anti-Episcopalian demographic, were forced into exile by the Company administration, becoming the Eleutheran Adventurers who settled on the island of Eleuthera in the Bahamas.

== Economy and industry ==
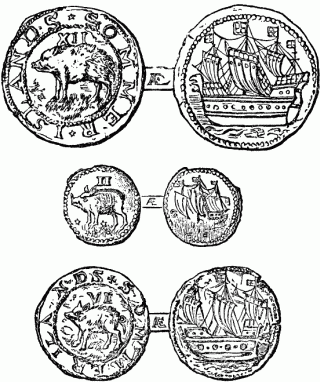
Coins minted by the Sommer Isles Company

Agriculture remained the mainstay of the economy under the Somers Isles Company. The primary cash crop was tobacco, but the quantity and quality produced were very poor. The Bermuda cedar boxes in which the tobacco was shipped to England were said to be worth more than their contents, and much of the tobacco was destroyed on arrival. The Colony also had little success with other export crops. Additionally, the several acres of arable land that had been cut from the forest meant that each farmer had only a very small area under cultivation, by comparison to the 50 acres (200,000 m^{2}) granted to each settler in Virginia. Bermudian farmers had to raise as many as three crops a year in order to be economically viable. This meant that they could not allow fields to lie fallow, and the soil, already high in alkaline and low in magnesium (used by plants to form chlorophyll), became depleted. By the 1620s, Virginia's tobacco exports were increasing, and newer English colonies in the West Indies were also emulating Bermuda by focusing on growing tobacco for export, with the result of drastically reducing the profitability of growing tobacco for Bermudian farmers. Bermudian farmers increasingly turned to growing food crops and rearing livestock, both to reduce their dependence on overpriced imports, and to sell to other colonies. This growing trade created a need for Bermudian-owned ships to deliver their exports.

Bermudians began to turn away from agriculture quite early, building boats and developing the Bermuda sloop to pursue maritime trades. As the Company derived no income, except from tobacco sent to England aboard the company's magazine ships, it acted to stymie these activities. The building of vessels was banned without its license, and the first laws to protect the Bermuda cedar, which were passed early in the seventeenth century, may have been intended more to restrict shipbuilding than to conserve the resource.

== Civil War ==
By the 1630s, the company had ceased sending Governors to Bermuda and began appointing a string of prominent Bermudians, such as William Sayle, to the role. As few Adventurers actually settled in Bermuda, with their properties instead managed by poorer relatives or tenants, the local House of Assembly was necessarily elected without a property qualification, unlike the House of Commons of England. This meant it was far more concerned with the interests of the islanders, rather than the Adventurers in England. By the mid-17th century, with tobacco exports failing, many Adventurers in England eagerly cut their losses by selling their shares to the tenants who occupied. Bermudians quickly became the majority of landowners, but the Adventurers who remained in England maintained control of the company by barring any shareholder who did not personally attend meetings in England from the decision-making process. Many of those English shareholders belonged to the gentry and anti-Episcopalian sects within the Church of England, and sided with the Parliamentarians during the 1642–1651 Civil War. Given the increasingly hostile relationship between Bermudians and the company, the majority of Bermudians sided with the Crown. With control of the military forces in Bermuda as well as the Assembly, the Royalists deposed the Company appointed Governor, Captain Thomas Turner, and elected John Trimigham in his stead. The colony's Independents, who sided with Parliament, were forced into exile, settling the Bahamas under the Cromwell-loyalist William Sayle as the Eleutheran Adventurers.

The response of Parliament to what was characterised as the rebellion of Bermuda (and of other colonies, particularly Virginia, Barbados, and Antigua) was the passage of An Act for prohibiting Trade with the Barbadoes, Virginia, Bermuda and Antego in October, 1650. This called for due punishment [to be] inflicted upon the said Delinquents, do Declare all and every the said persons in Barbada's, Antego, Bermuda's and Virginia, that have contrived, abetted, aided or assisted those horrid Rebellions, or have since willingly joyned with them, to be notorious Robbers and Traitors, and such as by the Law of Nations are not to be permitted any maner of Commerce or Traffique with any people whatsoever; and do forbid to all maner of persons, Foreiners, and others, all maner of Commerce, Traffique and Correspondency whatsoever, to be used or held with the said Rebels in the Barbada's, Bermuda's, Virginia and Antego, or either of them.

Parliamentary privateers were authorised to act against English vessels trading with these colonies: All Ships that Trade with the Rebels may be surprized. Goods and tackle of such ships not to be embezeled, till judgement in the Admiralty.; Two or three of the Officers of every ship to be examined upon oath. Parliament made preparations to invade the Royalist colonies, but the outbreak of the Second Anglo-Dutch War in 1651 was to engulf the British West Indies in war with France and Holland. A thousand miles distant, Bermuda was untouched by that war and reached a compromise with Parliament.

With the Restoration, Bermudians found they had a powerful ally in the Crown, which had its own interest in wresting control of the English Empire from corporations like the Somers Isles Company.

== Revocation of charter and dissolution ==
It was worsening interference by the Company into the livelihoods of the islanders which led to its dissolution. A protest to the Crown resulting initially from the treatment of Perient Trott and his heirs, but expanding to include the company's wider mismanagement of the colony, was directed to the Crown. This led to a lengthy court case in which the Crown championed Bermudians against the company. This resulted in the company's Royal Charter being revoked in 1684, and from then on the Crown assumed responsibility for appointing the Colony's governors (it first re-appointed the last company governor). Freed of the company's restraints, the local merchant class came to dominate and shape Bermuda's progress, as Bermudians abandoned agriculture en masse and turned to the sea.

== See also ==
- History of Bermuda
- History of Virginia
- Jamestown, Virginia
- List of trading companies
- Virginia Company of London
- Sea Venture
- Virginia Company
