= Restoration in the English colonies =

17th-century facet of history

The Restoration of the monarchy began in 1660 when the English, Scottish and Irish monarchies were all restored under Charles II after the republic (the "Commonwealth") that followed the Wars of the Three Kingdoms. The term "Restoration" may apply both to the actual event by which the monarchy was restored, and to the period immediately following the event.

== Caribbean ==
Barbados, as a haven for refugees fleeing the Commonwealth, had held for Charles II under Lord Willoughby until defeated by George Ayscue. When news reached Barbados of the King's restoration, Thomas Modyford declared Barbados for the King in July 1660. The planters, however, were not eager for the return of the former governor Lord Willoughby, fearing disputes over titles, but the King ordered he be restored.

Jamaica had been a conquest of Oliver Cromwell's and Charles II's claim to the island was therefore questionable. However, Charles II chose not to restore Jamaica to Spain and in 1661 it became a British colony; the planters would claim that they held rights as Englishmen by the King's assumption of the dominion of Jamaica. The first governor was Lord Windsor. He was replaced in 1664 by Thomas Modyford, who had been ousted from Barbados.

== North America ==
New England, with its Puritan settlement, had supported the Commonwealth and the Protectorate. Acceptance of the Restoration was reluctant in some quarters, as it highlighted the failure of Puritan rule in England. Rhode Island declared loyalty to the Crown first in October 1660 and Massachusetts lastly in August 1661. New Haven provided refuge for Regicides such as Edward Whalley, William Goffe and John Dixwell and would be subsequently merged into Connecticut in 1662, perhaps in punishment. John Winthrop, a former governor of Connecticut, and one of whose sons had been a captain in Monck's army, went to England at the Restoration and in 1662 obtained a Royal Charter for Connecticut with New Haven annexed to it.

King Charles would attempt to assert control over the New England Colonies by sending over the Royal Commission of 1664. Part of their goals were to provide a Court of Appeal against the excesses of the Puritan Massachusetts government. Later, he would sever the northern county of Massachusetts to create the royally controlled Province of New Hampshire. Political backlash helped spark Gove's Rebellion.

Maryland had resisted the republic until finally occupied by New England Puritans/Parliamentary forces after the Battle of the Severn in 1655. In 1660 the Governor Josias Fendall tried to turn Maryland into a Commonwealth of its own in what is known as Fendall's Rebellion, but with the fall of the Commonwealth in England he was left without support and was replaced by Philip Calvert upon the Restoration.

Virginia was the most loyal of King Charles II's dominions. It had, according to the eighteenth-century historian Robert Beverley, Jr., been "the last of all the King's Dominions that submitted to the Usurpation". Virginia had provided sanctuary for Cavaliers fleeing the English Commonwealth. Sir William Berkeley, who had previously been governor up until 1652, was again elected governor in 1660 by the House of Burgesses and he promptly declared for the King. The Anglican Church was restored as the established church.

In 1663 the Province of Carolina was formed as a reward given to some supporters of the Restoration. The province was named after the King, Charles II.

== See also ==
- English overseas possessions in the Wars of the Three Kingdoms
- Stuart Restoration
