= Richard Norwood =

English mathematician and surveyor

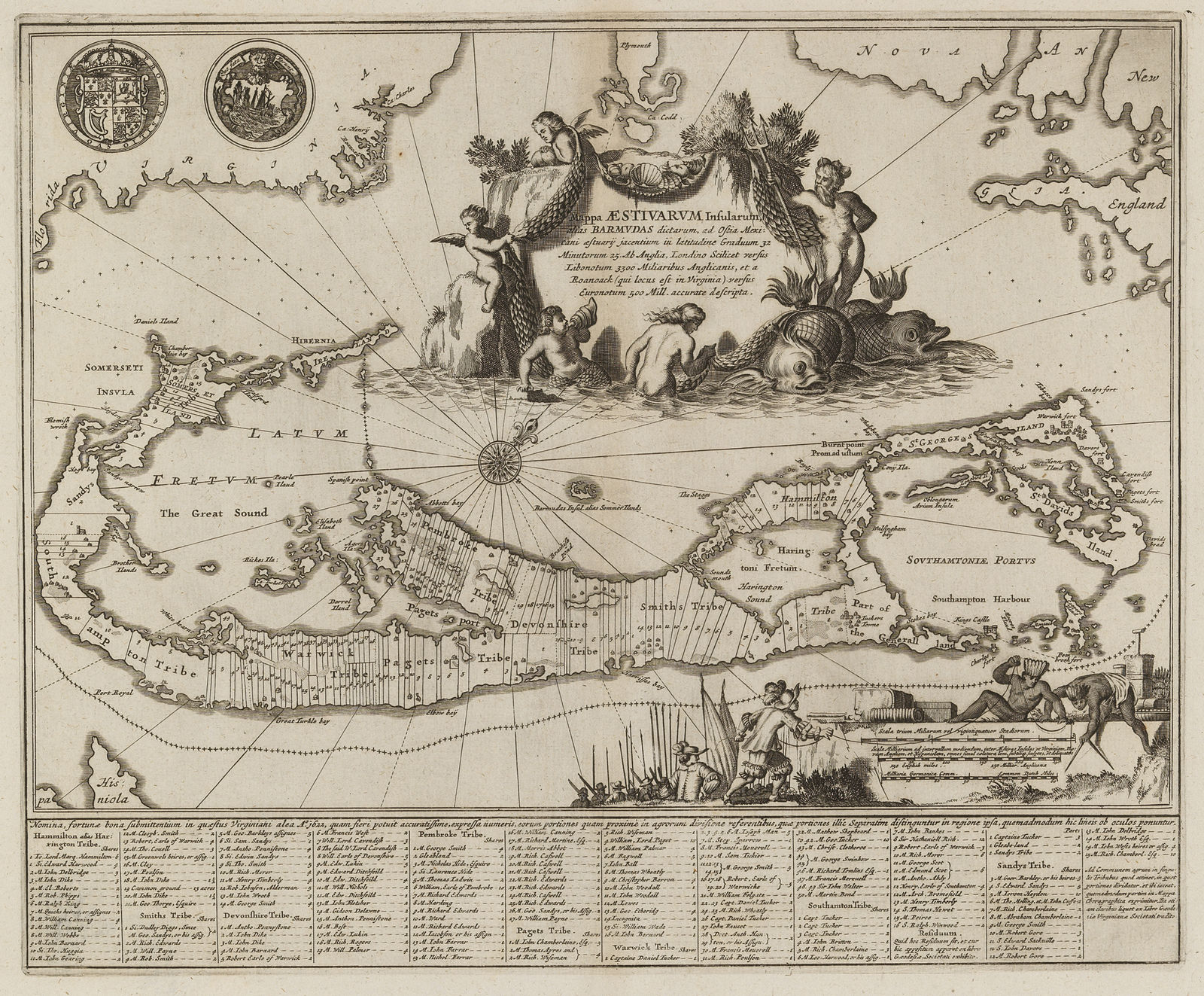
- 1622 map of the Somers Isles (Bermuda)
- Born: c. 1590; Stevenage, Hertfordshire, England
- Died: 1675 (aged 84–85); Hamilton Parish, Bermuda
- Known for: Surveying Bermuda in the 1600s
- Spouse: Rachel Boughton (m. 1622)

Richard Norwood (b. c. 1590 – d. 1675) was an English mathematician, diver, and surveyor. He has been called "Bermuda’s outstanding genius of the seventeenth century".

== Early life and first survey of Bermuda ==
Born about 1590, Richard Norwood was sent out by the Somers Isles Company to survey the islands of Bermuda in 1616 (also known as the Somers Isles), then newly settled. After a quick initial survey, in which the total land area was roughly estimated, he completed a more thorough final survey. He was later accused of collusion with the governor, and that, after assigning the shares to all the settlers, an "overplus" of eight shares of the best land remained over due to a discrepancy between the initial estimate and the final survey, which were taken for the personal advantage of himself and the Governor (when it became evident there would be an overplus, the Governor had stopped him surveying from East to West, and obliged him to resume surveying from the less desirable Ireland island at the extreme West End towards the East. ensuring the overplus would lie in the more desirable area of Southampton Parish (roughly where the Port Royal Golf Course is today). His map was published in London in 1622.

== Residence in Bermuda ==
In 1623, Norwood patented lands in Virginia, but it does not appear that he ever went there. He is said to have resided at that date in the Bermudas. He may have made several visits to the islands, but according to his own statements he was, for some years before 1630 and after, up to 1640, resident in London, near Tower Hill, as a teacher of mathematics. He is also credited with founding Bermuda's oldest school, Warwick Academy, in 1662.

Between June 1633 and June 1635 he personally measured, partly by chain and partly by pacing, the distance between London and York, making corrections for all the windings of the way, as well as for the ascents and descents. He also, from observations of the sun's altitude, computed the difference of latitude of the two places, and so calculated the length of a degree of the meridian (arc measurement). His result was some 600 yards too great; but it was the nearest approximation that had then been made in England. Isaac Newton noted Norwood's work in his Principia Mathematica.

=== English Civil war ===
During the English Civil War he resided in Bermuda, where he had a government grant as schoolmaster. He was also much involved with local government. On the 14th of May, 1645, Norwood wrote to the Governor and Company in London:

I suppose it is not altogether unknowne to you that this whole country almost consisteth of two partyes, the one of those that embrace or well approve the independent way here begunne, and these doe all adhere to Mr. White as their principall (wth his peace be it spoken, as I thinke he will take no offence at it, beeing so notorious and well knowne as it is) and amongst these also seemes to be a great part of those that are truely religious; not but that there are also diverse as truely religious and as sound christians that stand out and are against it. The other party (wch is farre the greater number) is of those that hold to the former discipline here used, untill the Parliament shall order otherwise; And these for the most part adhere to an old gentleman here, who (as an understanding gentleman of this Comp. once wrote) knowes how to use them to his owne ends; And there are few in the country but seeme to adhere either to the one of these or to the other. It is my hard lott (and some others also) to have the favor of neither of them, because I cannot fully conforme to either of them; whence chiefly it hath come to passe, that I who in England scarce ever had sute against any man, or any man against me; have here scarce ever bene free from suites and troubles, though I have wronged no man".

A Somers Isles Company magazine ship, which had left England before the King's 30 January 1649 execution, arrived at Bermuda in March, 1649, bearing news of the King's impending trial. It also bore instructions from the Company stripping the moderate Royalist Captain Thomas Turner of the office of Governor (which had been filled by a succession of Bermudian settlers since the 1630s, in contrast to the company's earlier practice of dispatching governors to the colony) and ordering that the colony be governed by a triumvirate composed of the moderate Richard Norwood, Captain Leacraft (also spelt Leicroft), and Mr. Wilkinson. However, Leacraft had died before the instructions arrived, Wilkinson was a strong Independent, obnoxious to the dominant Church faction in the Council and the House of Assembly, and was not permitted by them to exercise his commission, and Norwood would not accept his own commission without Wilkinson.

On the 18 December 1649, the Earl of Pembroke, Colonel Purefoy, Sir W. Constable, the Earl of Denbigh, Lord Whitelocke, Colonel Wanton, and Mr. Holland were appointed by the Council of State, with any three or more of them to be a committee with authority to examine the business of Bermuda. The Council of State Orders for the 1 January 1650, lists:

(17) That the following Reports brought in from the Comttee Appointed for the business of the Summers Island bee approved of vizt:

(18) That the Government of the Summers Island bee setled on Capt Foster, and his Councell, as already is appointed by ye Company

(19) That all Captaines and Commanders of the Forts and Castles within ye said Island, bee nominated and appointed, by ye said Governour wth the Consent of this Councell.

(20) That the said Governour and Councell, doe choose another Secretary in ye place of Vaughan if they see cause;

That the Gouernour and all other officers of Trust doe take the Engagmt according to ye order of Parliament.

That Imediatly after the Settlement of the said Governer and ye Councell, ye persons of Capt Turner, late Governour and Mr Viner the Minister bee secured, and upon Examinations and proofes taken concerning the Crimes and misdemeanours wch are informed against them, they bee forthwith sent over to England togeather wh ye said Examination & proofe.

These instructions and Forster's commission arrived in Bermuda on the 29 May 1650. Although the Country (the Royalist party) made charges against Forster and Captain Jennings on learning of this, demanding their charges be answered before the commission read, and many members of the Council denied to take notice of it because the l'tre was not directed to them with the Gour as here to fore, but eventually it was agreed to read it, and Forster was accepted as Governor.

The following day, Trimingham, Mr. Miller, Captain Jennings, and Mr. Morgan accepted the oaths of Councillors. Richard Norwood, Mr. Berkeley, and Mr. Wainwright refused. Mr. Deuitt would not accept because the company deserted him.

Despite accepting the instructions from London on the matter of the new appointments, the Government of Bermuda remained Royalist. With the Royalists in control of the military, the company-appointed governor was compelled to resign and John Trimingham elected to replace him. The Independent s who supported Parliament were forced into exile, settling the Bahamas as the Eleutheran Adventurers.

The Act prohibiting trade with Bermuda and the other colonies considered in rebellion was passed on 3 Oct, 1650.

Admiral Sir George Ayscue, in command of the task force sent in 1651 by Parliament to capture the Royalist colonies, received additional instructions from Whitehall (dated 13 February 1651) addressed to him and the other Commissioners, instructing "aswell to take Care for the reducemt of Bermuda's Virginia & Antego, as of the Island of Barbada's"; "In the case that (through the blessing of God upon yor endeavors) you shall be able to recover the Island of Barbada's unto its due subjection to this Comonwealth or after you have used your utmost dilligence to effect the same. If that you finde yorselves in a Capacity to send one or more of yo ships for the reduceing of any or all of the other plantacons to the like obedience. You are hereby Authorized and required soe to doe. And you are to make yor attempt upon the Island of Bermuda's, wch it is informed may without much strength or difficulty be gained or upon any the other plantacons now in defection as your Intelligence and opportunity shall serve". The instructions also specified that the officer in command of the force that captured a colony should then become its Governor, "But if either Care of the Fleet wth you or any othar important publiq service, will not admit of his Continuance there, to exercise the office & Comand of Governor thereof then it shall be lawfull for him the said Comr or commandrs in chiefe to depute & Constitute William Wilkinson of the Island of Bermudas or some other able and faithfull person to be Governor there, and to appoint such & soe many well affected & discreet persons to be a Councell for his Assistance as he thinks fit".

Barbados would surrender on 13 January 1652, but no attempt would be made to test Bermuda's defences. At a meeting of the Governor and Council on the 25 February 1652 (at which were present Governor Forster, Council members Captain Roger Wood, Captain Richard Jennings, Captain Thomas Turner, Captain William Seymour, Mr. Stephen Painter, Mr. William Wilkinson, Mr. John Miller, Mr. William Berkeley, Mr. Richard Norwood, and Secretary Anthony Jenour), a Generall Letter received from the company was read, which instructed them to engage to the Commonwealth of England "as yt is now established without a kinge or House of Lordes", which engagement was given and a proclamation ordered by the Governor explaining and commanding all inhabitants of Bermuda to take the same engagement when it should be tendered unto them.

=== Second survey of Bermuda ===
In 1662, he conducted a second survey of Bermuda.

== Death ==
Norwood was in England in 1667, probably only on a visit. He died at Bermuda in October 1675, aged about eighty-five, and was buried there.

== Works ==
His published works are:

- Trigonometrie, or the Doctrine of Triangles, 1631.
- The Seaman's Practice, 1637. Published London.
- Fortification, or Architecture Military, 1639.
- Truth gloriously appearing, 1645.
- Considerations tending to remove the Present Differences, 1646.
- Norwood's Epitomy, being the Application of the Doctrine of Triangles, 1667.

== Family ==
In 1622 Norwood married, in London, Rachel, daughter of Francis Boughton of Sandwich, Kent. He had a son Matthew, who in 1672–4 commanded a ship carrying stores to Bermuda.

== Notes and references ==
Attribution

- This article incorporates text from a publication now in the public domain: Laughton, John Knox (1895). "Norwood, Richard". In Lee, Sidney (ed.). Dictionary of National Biography. Vol. 41. London: Smith, Elder & Co.
- Richard Norwood, The Journal of Richard Norwood, 1639-1640, Surveyor of Bermuda, 1945, ed. Wesley Frank Craven and Walter B. Hayward, Scholars' Facsimiles & Reprints, ISBN 978-0-8201-1209-1.
