= William Sayle =

Governor of colonial South Carolina (c. 1590–1671)

1st Governor of South Carolina
- In office 15 March 1670 – 4 March 1671
- Monarchs: Charles II; James II & VII
- Preceded by: Office Established
- Succeeded by: Joseph West

Personal details
- Born: c. 1590 England
- Died: 1671 (aged c. 81) Bahamas, British Bahamas
- Occupation: Explorer, colonial administrator, slave owner

Captain William Sayle (Note: Pronounced /ˈseɪl/ SAYL, as though spelled sail) (c. 1590 – 1671) was a prominent English landholder who was Governor of Bermuda in 1643 and again in 1658. As an Independent in religion and politics, and an adherent of Oliver Cromwell, he was dissatisfied with life in Bermuda, and so founded the company of the Eleutheran Adventurers who became the first European settlers of the Bahamas between 1646 and 1648. He later became the first governor of colonial South Carolina from 1670 to 1671.

== Life in Bermuda ==
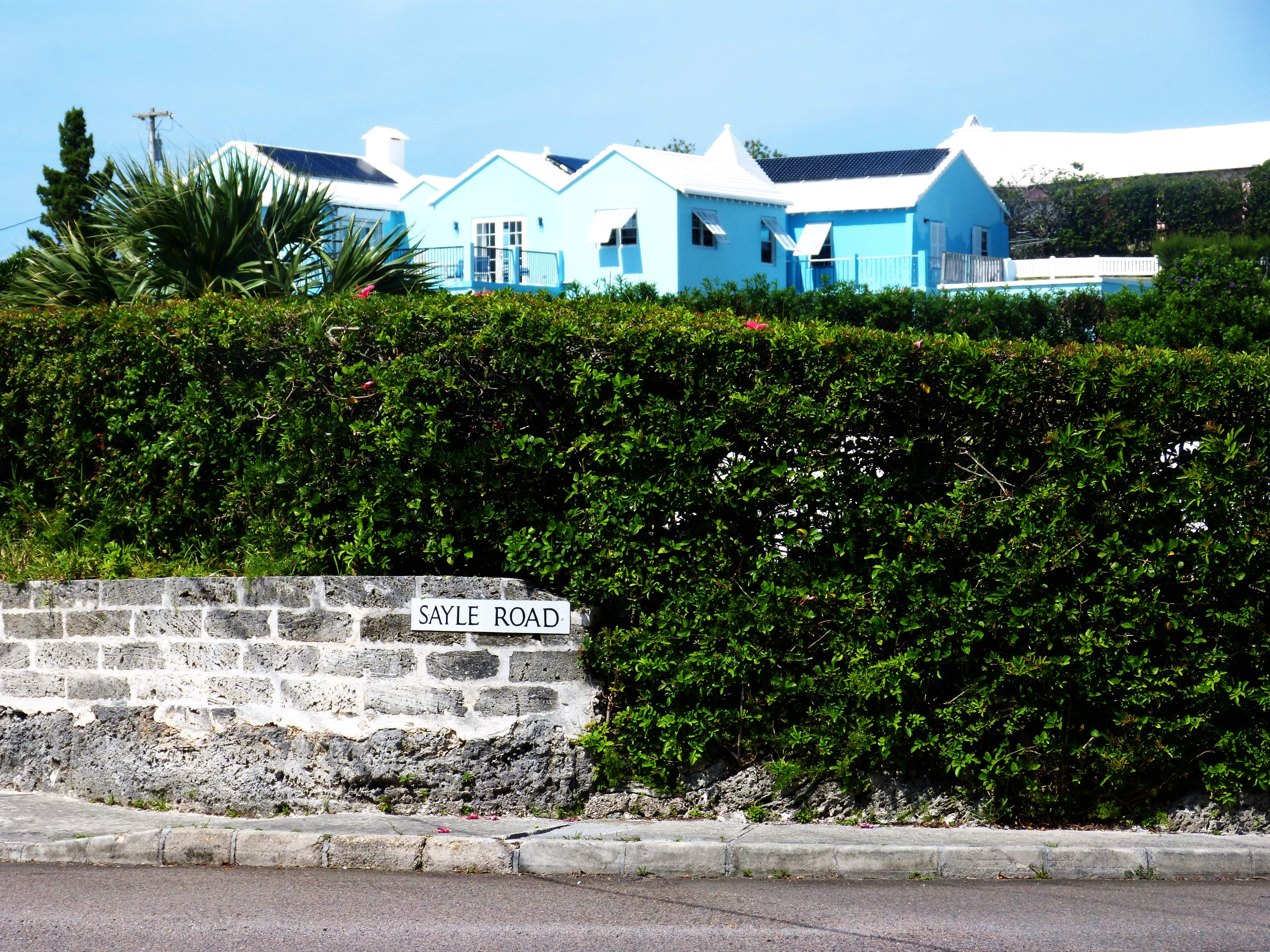
Sayle Road, at its intersection with Verdmont Road, in Smith's Parish, Bermuda

Bermuda, or the "Somers Isles", was settled by Europeans in 1609 as a result of the wrecking of the Sea Venture, the flagship of the Virginia Company. Although most of the passengers and crew continued to Jamestown, Virginia, the following year on two Bermuda-built ships, the Royal Charter of the company and the boundaries of Virginia were extended to include Bermuda in 1612, when the first governor (at the time, actually the lieutenant-governor) and sixty colonists joined the three men who had remained behind from the Sea Venture. Bermuda's 21 square miles were subdivided into nine parishes (at first called "tribes"). The easternmost, St. George's (where St. George's town was established), was designated "common" or "Crown" land, but the remainder were further subdivided into "shares", each equivalent to a specific share held in the company. The parishes (other than St. George's) were each named for a major shareholder (or "adventurer") in the company. Administration was handed to the crown in 1614, and then in 1615 transferred to a spin-off of the Virginia Company called the Somers Isles Company. The Company appointed a governor, who from 1620 oversaw a House of Assembly that differed from the House of Commons in having no property qualification (due to most land in Bermuda being then owned by absentee landlords). As the House of Assembly consequently governed for the benefit of Bermuda's landless men, a Council made-up of prominent local men appointed by the company was introduced as a combination of upper house and cabinet. This was intended to ensure the balance of power remained with the company, rather than the settlers, but with no other group from which to appoint its members, the council quickly became dominated by men from the same prominent local families that filled the Assembly, and political power rested firmly with this emerging local elite and their descendants until the introduction of universal adult suffrage and party politics in the 1960s.

Although Bermuda quickly became a thriving colony, the growth of tobacco as a cash crop that was the basis of the economy under company administration became unprofitable from the 1620s as Virginia became stable and self-sufficient and England established newer and larger colonies, all of which emulated Bermuda's economy, flooding the English market with cheap tobacco. Few shareholders in the company actually settled in Bermuda, and the land was occupied and worked by tenants and by indentured servants who repaid the cost of their transport to Bermuda with seven years' labour. The more successful settlers (whether they arrived as shareholders or tenants at their own expense or as indentured servants) increased their landholdings by purchasing shares from adventurers who were finding them ever less profitable. Whereas absentee landowners primarily relied on tobacco exports, residents began to switch to maritime trades, replanting the fields that had been cleared from the forest with Bermuda cedar, which was vital to shipbuilding and more valuable than cash crops like tobacco. They also grew food crops and raised livestock for their own consumption, and exported their excess production aboard their new ships for sale in other colonies. This put them at odds with the company, which only earned profits from the tobacco grown for export. This contest between the settlers and the company would end when the settlers took their complaint to the Crown and the company's Royal Charter was revoked in 1684.

1632 engraving of Bermuda's fortifications

Sayle appears to have settled in Bermuda by about 1630. He owned considerable property in the colony, with 165 shares totalling 220.5 acres in Southampton, Smith's, and Pembroke parishes, according to the 1662–1663 survey by Richard Norwood. Among his possessions was the property where the house in Smith's known as Verdmont was built about 1710 off Sayle Road. As one of the colony's most prominent men, he served as a military officer in command of King's Castle, and was at times a member of the council (that combined the roles now performed by the Senate and the Cabinet). By this period, the Somers Isles Company had ceased sending new Governors from abroad, and appointed a succession of prominent residents to the position. Sayle was appointed Governor from 1641 to 1642 and 1643 to 1644, but as an Independent Puritan, aligned with the Parliamentary cause, the Commonwealth and then Oliver Cromwell's Protectorship, he was to be at odds with the majority of Bermuda's dominant elite.

== The English Civil War ==
In the 1640s, Bermuda was divided by conflict between the episcopal Church of England and revolutionary Independent Puritans and Presbyterians. This was the same as the conflict between Bermudian Royalists and Parliamentarians, as the English Civil War extended into the English colonies. In Bermuda, most of the settlers had already become estranged from the Somers Isles Company as those shareholders who had remained in England had barred those who lived in Bermuda from having any say in the management of the company (as only those who attended the company's annual general meetings in England were able to vote upon its policies). This meant that, although most land was by then owned by residents like Sayle, their interests were thwarted in order to ensure maximum profits for the shareholders in England. As most of the shareholders in England sided with Parliament (the officer in Bermuda usually referred to as the "Governor of Bermuda" was actually the "Lieutenant-Governor of Bermuda", with the office of "Governor" held at the time held by one of the largest absentee adventurers, Lord High Admiral of the Parliamentary navy Robert Rich, the Earl of Warwick) when war broke out, most Bermudians saw their interests as aligned with the Crown's. The military force in Bermuda was composed of nine companies of militia infantry and the volunteer artillery that manned the coastal batteries. This was a part time force, able to be mobilised during war or emergency, and with all of the officers and other ranks being Bermudians.

As the Crown and the Church of England attempted to assert their authorities, similar conflicts took place in other parts of the English realm leading up to the Civil War and the Interregnum, as well as in English-ruled Ireland (where native Irish Catholics and royalists would be suppressed after the 1649–1653 Cromwellian conquest of Ireland, and from where Presbyterian settlers from the Kingdom of England and the Kingdom of Scotland, resenting the Crown's attempts in the 1630s to bring them under Episcopalian authority, had begun to re-emigrate to North America where they became known as Scots-Irish or Scotch-Irish).

From 1644 to 1646 (interrupted by a brief governorship by Captain Josias Forster, who had been loathed by the Independents), Bermuda was governed by The Triumvirate of Captain William Sayle, Stephen Paynter, and William Wilkinson, all of whom were Independents whose rule was resented by the larger part of the population. They established a minority rule that both the Episcopalians and the Presbyterians found tyrannical, resulting in their alliance against the Independents (whereas in England the Presbyterians had allied with the Independents under Parliament against the Royalist Episcopalians).

On 14 May 1645, moderate Richard Norwood wrote to the Governor and Company in London:

I suppose it is not altogether unknowne to you that this whole country almost consisteth of two partyes, the one of those that embrace or well approve the independent way here begunne, and these doe all adhere to Mr. White as their principall (wth his peace be it spoken, as I thinke he will take no offence at it, beeing so notorious and well knowne as it is) and amongst these also seemes to be a great part of those that are truely religious; not but that there are also diverse as truely religious and as sound christians that stand out and are against it. The other party (wch is farre the greater number) is of those that hold to the former discipline here used, untill the Parliament shall order otherwise; And these for the most part adhere to an old gentleman here, who (as an understanding gentleman of this Comp. once wrote) knowes how to use them to his owne ends; And there are few in the country but seeme to adhere either to the one of these or to the other. It is my hard lott (and some others also) to have the favor of neither of them, because I cannot fully conforme to either of them; whence chiefly it hath come to passe, that I who in England scarce ever had sute against any man, or any man against me; have here scarce ever bene free from suites and troubles, though I have wronged no man".

Also in 1645, Robert Huson, Thomas Jennings and Richard Sothworth composed a "Humble Petition & Declaration of general inhabitants of the Plantation and Colony in the Somer Islands" to the Governor and Company in London accusing the Independent Governors and clergymen of "arrogating to themselves unlimited power, in seeking to draw the inhabitants of this Plantation to worship their imaginations contrary (as we conceive) to the laws of god & man", and "for our Divines declare that they are not subject to any human power; & in particular Master Copeland affirms, 'That if the King Parliament & Synod shall command any uniformity in the church, other than this, which is here set on foot by them, they will obey none". They wrote that "it is a grievance under which we groun, that the Triumvirate Government cast upon us at first & now continued procures a scorn & contempt upon us from all other Plantations, with other just exceptions which we omit, but especially that you have by the continuance of Government put upon us a yoke insupportable", and "you have continued such Governors, two of which have submitted to the Independent Covenant and have set up a Supreme Governor in their Church, that will neither wait upon King or Keyser (in their own words)".

To end the strife in the colony, the Somers Isles Company, in 1645, appointed Captain Thomas Turner, reputed a moderate, as Lieutenant-Governor (the office of "Governor" was held at the time by Lord High Admiral Robert Rich, the Earl of Warwick). Turner arrived at Bermuda in April, 1646. Royalist John Vaughan was appointed Secretary, replacing Henry Smith, on 25 April 1646, and Independents were removed from Government. The Independents found Turner as objectionable as the Royalists had the Triumvirate.

In June, 1646, Captain William Sayle and William Golding, who had been an Independent preacher to the congregation in Bermuda, went to London to present a petition by Bermuda's Independents to the High Court of Parliament, "that your Petitioners may not languish under an usurped power; nor the power and honour of Parliament be trampled on, by the vilest of our English Nation". The Petitioners' complaints were not only against local Royalists, but also against the predatory commercial practices of, and interference by, the Somers Isles Company.

Turner was accused, in Golding's 1648 pamphlet "Servants on horse-back" (containing the 1646 petition to Parliament), of maintaining the military against local Independents even while having little concern of a foreign threat:

Fourthly, no considerable quantity of Ammunition and Armes, to secure so considerable a Garrison. And all the use the Ammunition serveth to (for present) is to keep in awe the Independents; for when Captaine Sayle was in the Harbour, with a small ship, with some twenty men Captaine Turner kept a guard, pretending feares, but when a Spanish ship was wrackt, and a hundred of Souldiers, & Sea-men came a shoar; and most of the Inhabitants of ability gone aboard, no appearance of a guard.* Captaine Turner had another game in chase, the nine Hogs-heads of corne paid him by the Country for the former guard, is a trifle to what he rakes now from the Spaniards, with-out regard of justice or civility. *But dismist the guard before the pretence of Fear was removed.

The event Golding described took place in October, 1647, when Sayle arrived with "diuers passengers, And vppon information had of store of armes and ammunicon wch they had on board". Sayle delivered letters from Parliament and the Somers Isles Company, and addressed the Governor and Council at John Trimingham's house, advising that in London he had found religious toleration, and that the "Episcopall ministers did preach, the presbitterians did preach, and the Independents did teach, And where the presbitterians taught he could neuer find above a half score people, but all the rest constantly full and then he proceeded howe he had obtained free trade for the Inhabitants here, and being required to showe his warrant for it he said that some of the company opposed it, but he left his lawer to try it with them, and that my Lord of warwicke had bin for it this 18 yeares". With no official document to support his assertion regarding free trade, Governor Turner told him "it is contrary to our commission and our oath, the wch I will maintain inviolable by Gods assistance soe longe as I haue to do with the gournment".

A Somers Isles Company magazine ship, which had left England before the King's 30 January 1649 execution, arrived at Bermuda in March, 1649, bearing news of the King's impending trial. It also bore instructions from the Company stripping Captain Thomas Turner of the office of Governor and ordering that the colony be governed by a triumvirate composed of Richard Norwood, Captain Leacraft (also spelt "Leicroft"), and William Wilkinson. However, Leacraft had died before the instructions arrived, Wilkinson was a "strong Independent", "obnoxious to the dominant Church faction" in the Council and the House of Assembly, and "was not permitted by them to exercise his commission", and Norwood would not accept his own commission without Wilkinson. Captain Turner, Captain Josias Forster, and Roger Wood (all three having formerly held the office of Governor) were put forward as candidates for the Governorship, which was voted upon by the other members of the council. Although Captain Richard Jennings and the Sheriff both voted for Wood, the others all voted for Turner, who reluctantly resumed the office. Turner was too moderate for most of the Royalist party, however.

When news of the King's execution reached Bermuda, the Government of Bermuda made Bermuda the first colony to recognize Charles II as King, declaring:

give our heartie thanks for your loyaltie to the kinge and Crown of Englande wee doe acknowledge the high-born Charles Prince of Wales to be heir to the crowne and kingdome of England Scotland ffrance and Ireland after the decease of his royal father and we doe hereby declare and utter, we detest and dissent that horrid Act of Slayinge his Majtie and by the oath wch wee have taken, wee shall beare faith and alleadgiance to the Lawfulle Kinge of England his heirss and successors.

On 20 August 1649, Governor Turner ordered a proclamation to be drawn up and published (dated 21 August) requiring that, as various persons in the colony had "taken the oath of supremacy and alleadgiance vunto his matie the Lawfull kinge of England and yet neuertheles they contrarye to theire oathes doe deny conformity to the lawes and Government here established", all such persons who refused conformity to the Government in both the church and state could expect no protection by virtue of any former power or order, and would face prosecution.

Turner's governorship would end after Mr. Whetenhall, in the name of the Country, impeached the Reverend Nathaniel White of the Puritan party for being an enemy of the King, Company, and country. A warrant was issued for White's arrest. On 25 September 1649, the Council and Country met at the home of John Trimingham after "the party in arms called 'The Country'" had arrested White under the aforementioned warrant, along with most of the Independents (who had been imprisoned in the house of a Mrs. Taylor). The Country exhibited articles against Governor Turner. Although the Council deemed the articles not to be grounds for his displacement, the Country was insistent against Turner, who therefore resigned the office of Governor. The Country then put forward John Trimingham and Thomas Burrows to the Council as candidates for Turner's replacement. The Council members elected Trimingham. On Thursday, 27 September 1649, "the Army brought downe the new Gour and he tooke his oathe in the Church according to the usuall forme and vppon ffryday they marched awaye out of the towne (of St Georges) into the mayne".

Many of the island's defeated Puritans were forced to emigrate, settling in the Bahamas as the Eleutheran Adventurers under the leadership of William Sayle.

After Parliamentary victory in England in 1646, five of the financiers of Sayle's mission to Eleuthera signed the death warrant of King Charles I.

Like Bermuda, Virginia and a handful of other colonies, remained loyal to the Crown. The Commonwealth barred trade with these colonies, which were singled out by the Rump Parliament in An Act for prohibiting Trade with the Barbadoes, Virginia, Bermuda and Antego, which was passed on 30 October 1650. This stated that

due punishment [be] inflicted upon the said Delinquents, do Declare all and every the said persons in Barbada's, Antego, Bermuda's and Virginia, that have contrived, abetted, aided or assisted those horrid Rebellions, or have since willingly joyned with them, to be notorious Robbers and Traitors, and such as by the Law of Nations are not to be permitted any maner of Commerce or Traffique with any people whatsoever; and do forbid to all maner of persons, Foreiners, and others, all maner of Commerce, Traffique and Correspondency whatsoever, to be used or held with the said Rebels in the Barbada's, Bermuda's, Virginia and Antego, or either of them.

Parliamentary privateers were authorised to prey on vessels trading with these colonies. The Rump Parliament began amassing forces for the conquests of these colonies before the English colonies in the West Indies were caught up in the Second Anglo-Dutch War. Bermuda would eventually reach a compromise with the London Government which kept the Parliamentary forces out, and preserved the status quo within the colony.

== Settlement of the Bahamas ==
William Sayle established the first English settlement of the Bahamas between 1646 and 1648 on the island of Eleuthera, establishing England's claim to the Bahamas archipelago. He left Bermuda with seventy settlers, mostly Bermudians and some English, who were looking for a place where they could worship God freely. To this end they settled on the Island of Segatoo which they gave the name Eleuthera, from the Greek word meaning freedom. This settlement was planned and authorised from England, and did not result from Bermuda's internal strife. As England's first trans-Atlantic colony to become self-sustaining, Bermuda had been important in supporting the establishment of other English colonies in North America and the west Indies, and the settlement of the Bahamas was to take place from the Bermuda, rather than directly from England. Many of the settlers were, in fact, driven out of Bermuda by intolerance and persecution resulting from the Civil War. In 1644, Bermudian Independent Puritans had sent an expedition to explore the Bahamas, but one vessel was lost and the other failed to find a suitable island.

The exact dates and circumstances of Sayle's voyage are uncertain. Some sources say that Sayle first left Bermuda in 1646, however, Sayle and his Eleutheran Adventurers did not agree on their "Articles and Orders of Incorporation" until 9 July 1647. Perhaps Sayle made at least two voyages, for in a letter of March 1646, William Rener of Bermuda writes to John Winthrop of Massachusetts to report that of two ships recently sailed to the Bahamas, one had been lost and one returned to Bermuda without having found the Bahamas. Rener also mentions that he and Sayle had purchased half interest in a ship, the William, for the purpose of sailing to the Bahamas. In any case, Sayle took seventy people to settle at some point between spring 1646 and autumn 1648. The victorious Royalist Government of Bermuda subsequently ordered two other Cromwellian ministers, and sixty of their followers, to emigrate to the Bahamas.

Sayle's legal claim to proprietorship in the Bahamas now seems questionable. In 1646, Sayle, then of Bermuda, claimed to have a grant from the English Parliament to the island of Sagatos, Bahamas, but no record of this grant can be found in The Journal of the House of Commons. However, on 31 August 1649 The Journal does record that "An Act for Settling the Islands in the West Indies betwixt the Degrees of Twenty-four and Twenty-nine North Latitude was passed." Though the Act does not mention William Sayle specifically, a letter from lawyer John Bolles dated 15 August 1654 refers to an act passed in 1650 "for encouragement of adventurers to some newly discovered Islands", and Bolles mentions "William Saile" as one of the twenty-six proprietors. Authorisation, then, may have come after the fact. Sayles was the only one of the twenty-six proprietors to settle in the Bahamas, and he tried to exercise propriety rights over the island much of his life.

The difficulties of frontier life and of internal conflicts were not fertile ground for a democracy. On the voyage to the Bahamas, a Captain Butler, one of the settlers from England, rebelled against the Articles and caused such trouble in the new settlement that William Sayle left the original settlement in north Eleuthera for the nearby island of St. George's Cay, now known as Spanish Wells.

Following the Government of Bermuda's acceptance of the sovereignty of Parliament, exiled Independents were permitted to return to the colony. In 1657, Sayle returned to Bermuda, and in 1658, he was re-appointed Governor (he was first appointed Deputy Governor and Captain General on 30 June), a position he lost in 1662, when he was appointed to the Council of Bermuda. He was also re-appointed Commander of the King's Castle.

== Articles and orders of 1647 ==
The Articles that Sayle drew up in 1647 reflect the ambiguities of the English Civil War taking place at that time between Royalists and Parliamentarians. Therefore, while the preamble refers to the "Raign of our Soveraign Lord Charles, by the Grace of God, King of England, Scotland, France, and Ireland; Defender of the Faith, &c", the articles themselves make clear that the new settlement was to be effectively independent, making no further mention of royal authority. On the contrary, they concern the rules governing the "Members of the Republick" and the "Magistracie or officers of the Republicke". The articles established freedom of religion and opinion, three hundred acres of land per settler, governance under a governor and twelve councillors chosen from a senate composed of the first 100 settlers, and humane treatment of any indigenous people still on the island. It has been noted that if Sayle's settlement had been successful, then he would have created in the Bahamas "the first democratic state in the New World," some 130 years before the American Revolution.

== Governor of Carolina Colony ==
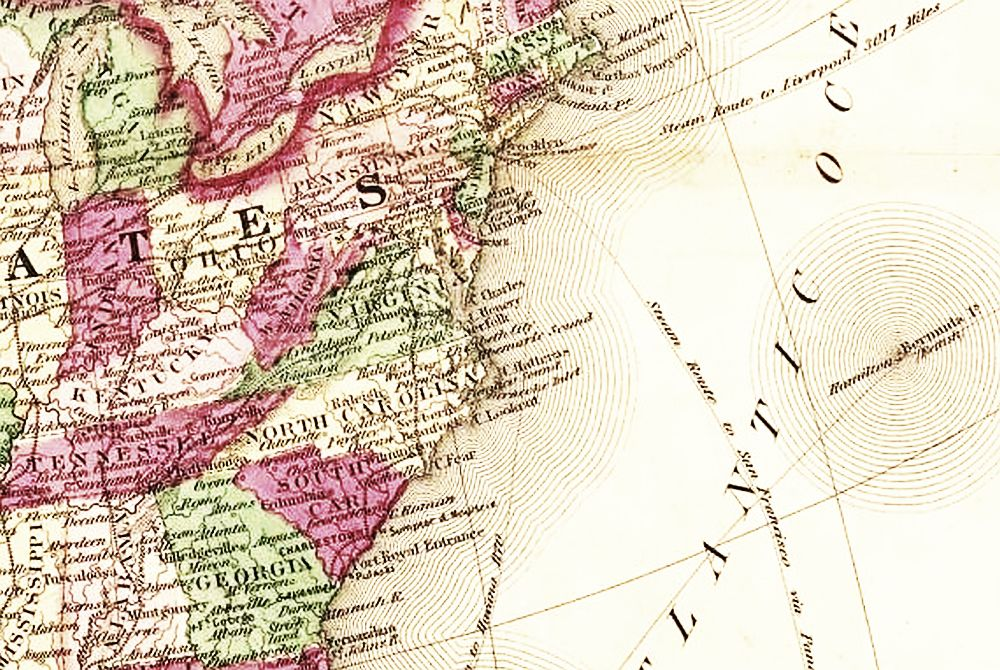
19th century map showing the relative positions of the Carolinas, Virginia, Georgia and Bermuda

In 1669, Sayle took over the command of a party of settlers to a new settlement in Carolina after Sir John Yeamans resigned, while undergoing repairs of his vessel in Bermuda. He arrived in South Carolina aboard a Bermuda sloop with a number of Bermudian families, and founded the town of Charleston. In 1670, William Sayle, then in his eighties, became the first Colonial Governor of the colony of Carolina (in 1669, Carolina would be split into two provinces, and in 1712 the southern Clarendon province, that included Charleston, became South Carolina while the Albemarle province became North Carolina). Sayles was also instrumental in encouraging the Lords Proprietors to successfully apply for a grant of The Bahama Islands in 1670. He died in 1671.

== Sources ==
- Bethell, A. Talbot. Early Settlers of the Bahamas and Colonists of North America, 1937. Westminster, MD: Heritage Books, Inc., (2008) Reprint.
- Jarvis, Michael The Exodus, in The Bermudian magazine, June 2001.
- Riley, Sandra. Homeward Bound: A History of the Bahama Islands to 1850 with a Definitive Study of Abaco in the American Loyalist Plantation Period. Miami, Florida: Riley Hall Publishers, 2000. Print.
