= Anthony Aucher (the elder) =

British businessman

- Known for: High Sheriff of Kent
- Parent: Edward Aucher

Sir Anthony Aucher was the High Sheriff of Kent, briefly the Member of Parliament for Rochester, and a businessman who was an adventurer (shareholder) in the Virginia Company, Somers Isles Company, and East India Company before being outlawed due to debts. His father was Edward Aucher (d. 14 February 1568). His paternal grandfather was Anthony Aucher (d. 9 January 1558), an agent of Henry VIII, who, in 1547, received the Manor of Plumford in the parish of Ospringe from King Edward VI of England. Sir Edwin Sandys was his maternal uncle. Aucher acquired valuable property through his marriage to Hester Collett, daughter of merchant Peter Collett, and through inheritance on the death of his father.
