= An Act for prohibiting Trade with the Barbadoes, Virginia, Bermuda and Antego =

English Commonwealth legislation

- Act of Parliament
- Parliament of England
- Long title: An Act for prohibiting Trade with the Barbadoes, Virginia, Bermuda and Antego
- Territorial extent: English colonies in North America and the Caribbean (Note: It applied across the colonies but was explicitly against the Colonies of Bermuda, Virginia, Barbados and Antigua (then called Antego) who supported the monarchy during the English Civil War.)

Dates
- Commencement: 30 October 1650

Status: Revoked

An Act for prohibiting Trade with the Barbadoes, Virginia, Bermuda and Antego or Act prohibiting Commerce and Trade with the Barbodoes, Antigo, Virginia, and Bermudas alias Summer's Islands was an Act of law passed by the Rump Parliament of England during the Interregnum against English colonies which sided with the Crown in the English Civil War (see English overseas possessions in the Wars of the Three Kingdoms).

Although the newer, Puritan settlements in North America, most notably Massachusetts, were dominated by Parliamentarians, the older colonies sided with the Crown. Six colonies recognized Charles II after the regicide in 1649: Antigua, Barbados, Bermuda, Virginia, Maryland, and Newfoundland. The Parliamentarians were busy subduing Royalists in Scotland, Ireland, the Isles of Scilly, the Isle of Man, and the Channel Islands, and could not immediately force their rule on the colonies. The Virginia Company's settlements, Bermuda and Virginia (Bermuda was the first colony to recognize Charles II, deposing its Parliamentarian Governor and electing a replacement, while its Independent Puritans were expelled, settling the Bahamas under William Sayle), as well as Antigua and Barbados were conspicuous in their loyalty to the Crown, and were singled out by the Rump Parliament in An Act for prohibiting Trade with the Barbadoes, Virginia, Bermuda and Antego, which was passed on the 30 October 1650.

The act read:

Whereas in Virginia, and in the Islands of Barbada's, Antego, St. Christophers, Mevias, Mounsirat, Bermuda's, and divers other Islands and places in America, there hath been and are Colonies and Plantations, which were planted at the Cost, and setled by the People, and by Authority of this Nation, which are and ought to be subordinate to, and dependent upon England; and hath ever since the Planting thereof been, and ought to be subject to such Laws, Orders and Regulations as are or shall be made by the Parliament of England; And whereas divers acts of Rebellion have been committed by many persons inhabiting in Barbada's, Antego, Bermuda's and Virginia, whereby they have most Trayterously, by Force and Subtilty, usurped a Power of Government, and seized the Estates of many well-affected persons into their hands, and banished others, and have set up themselves in opposition to, and distinct from this State and Commonwealth, many of the chief Actors in, and Promoters of these Rebellions, having been transported and carried over to the said Plantations in Forein Ships, without leave, license or consent of the Parliament of England; the Parliament of England taking the premises into consideration, and finding themselves obliged to use all speedy, lawful and just means for the Suppression of the said Rebellion in the said Plantations, and reducing the same to fidelity and due obedience, so as all peaceable and well-affected people, who have been Robbed, Spoiled, Imprisoned or Banished through the said Treasonable practices, may be restored to the freedom of their persons, and possession of their own Lands and Goods, and due punishment inflicted upon the said Delinquents, do Declare all and every the said persons in Barbada's, Antego, Bermuda's and Virginia, that have contrived, abetted, aided or assisted those horrid Rebellions, or have since willingly joyned with them, to be notorious Robbers and Traitors, and such as by the Law of Nations are not to be permitted any maner of Commerce or Traffique with any people whatsoever; and do forbid to all maner of persons, Foreiners, and others, all maner of Commerce, Traffique and Correspondency whatsoever, to be used or held with the said Rebels in the Barbada's, Bermuda's, Virginia and Antego, or either of them.

All Ships that Trade with the Rebels may be surprized.Goods and tackle of such ships not to be embezeled, till judgement in the Admiralty.; Two or three of the Officers of every ship to be examined upon oath.

And be it Enacted by this present Parliament, and by the authority of the same, That after due publication of this Act made, to the end that none may justly pretend ignorance, it shall and may be lawful to any the Fleet or Ships sent forth or imployed by the Parliament, or any private Men of War or Ships to be allowed or approved in that behalf by the immediate Power of Parliament, or the Council of State established by Parliament, to seize, surprize and take all and all maner of Ships, Vessels and Goods, of what nature or kinde soever, belonging to all persons whatsoever whether Foreiners or others, or of what Nation soever, that shall be found or met withal, Trading or going to Trade, or coming from Trading with the said Rebels, or in or at the said Island of Barbada's, Bermudas, Virginia or Antego aforesaid, or any part or parts thereof, or that shall hold any Correspondency with the said Rebels, or yield them any assistance or relief for the supporting their said Rebellion: And the same Ships and Goods so surprized, to send in to be proceeded against in the Court of Admiralty by vertue of this Act; and the Judges of that Court finding the same to be within the tenor and true meaning of this Act, to adjudge the same to be well taken, and to be good and lawful Prize.

And for the better Information of the said Court, and to the end the proceedings therein may be acted and done according to the Rules of Law and Justice, and that nothing irregular may therein, or by the Takers, be acted or committed, Be it further Enacted, That none of the Goods nor Tackle, Apparel or Furniture of the said Ships so to be surprized by vertue of this Act, shall be imbezeled or purloyned, but shall be preserved safe and entire till Judgement be first given in the said Court of Admiralty, or other Order or Decree there made thereupon: And that all the Commissions, Consignments, Bills of Lading, Cocquets, Letters, and all other Instruments and Writings whatsoever, that shall be found on Board the said Ships and Vessels, shall be duly sent up to the said Court of Admiralty: And that also two or three of the Officers or principal persons of, or found in every such Ship or Vessel, shall either be brought up to be Examined upon Oath in the said Court, as well touching the said Writings found in the said Ship, and the Proprietors, Owners and Masters of the same Ships, and the Goods therein, and the places from whence they come, and to whom consigned, and whither bound, and such other Questions and Interrogatories as in each particular case shall be found meet; or otherwise, in case they cannot with conveniency be sent up, that then they be so Examined duly upon Oath, before the chief Officer of some Port in England, or the next Justice of the Peace, concerning the premises before recited; and their Examinations, together with all the Writings found on Board the said Ships or Vessels, to be duly transmitted to the said Court; And the Judges of the said Court thereupon, and upon such other Proofs and Evidences as shall be duly made, or exhibited before them, shall proceed to Judgement, and give definitive Sentence by vertue of this Act, according as the nature of the Fact shall be proved before them, and according to the Rules and Grounds of Justice: And if Judgement shall be given for the same to be lawful Price, then it shall be disposed in such sort and maner as is in this present Act afterwards limited and appointed.

Ships of Forein Nations prohibited trade with English Plantations, without license.

And to prevent for the time to come, and to hinder the carrying over of any such persons as are Enemies to this Commonwealth, or that may prove dangerous to any of the English Plantations in America, the Parliament doth forbid and prohibit all Ships of any Forein Nation whatsoever, to come to, or Trade in, or Traffique with any of the English Plantations in America, or any Islands, Ports or places thereof, which are planted by, and in possession of the People of this Commonwealth, without License first had and obtained from the Parliament or Council of State.

Lawful to seize such Ships. How Prizes shal be disposed; Tenth to the Admiral reserved.

And be it further Enacted, Ordained and Declared by the Authority aforesaid, That from and after the Twentieth day of November, One thousand six hundred and fifty, It shall and may be lawful for any Ship or Ships set forth by the Parliament, or allowed of by the Parliament or Council of State, to seize, take and surprize any Ship or Ships of any Forein Nation whatsoever, that shall be outward bound to any of the said Plantations, Ports or places, without such License as aforesaid; and from and after the first of January, One thousand six hundred and fifty, It shall and may be lawful for such Ships set forth and allowed as aforesaid, to seize, take and surprize any Forein Ships that shall be found Trading at any of the Plantations, Islands and places aforesaid, without such License as aforesaid; and from and after the Twentieth day of March, One thousand six hundred and fifty, It shall and may be lawful for any of the Parliaments Ships, or private Men of War, allowed of by the Parliament or Council of State for the time being, to seize, take and surprize any Ship or Ships that are coming from, or have Traded at any of the Plantations as aforesaid, without such License as aforesaid: And all such Ships so taken, with all Goods, Tackle, Apparel and Furniture, to send into some Port of this Commonwealth, to be proceeded against in the Court of Admiralty, as in this Act is ordered, limited and appointed in case of Trading to Barbada's, Antego, Bermuda's and Virginia, or any of them: All which Prizes so to be taken and Adjudged by vertue of this Act, shall be disposed of as followeth; that is to say, Of what shall be taken by the Ships set forth by the Parliament, Two thirds thereof to be to the use of the Commonwealth, for the Service of the Navy, as the Parliament shall direct; and one other Third part to be to the Commanders, Officers and Company of those Ships by whom the same shall be taken respectively, according to the usual Rules of Division amongst them: And for what shall be taken by private Men of War allowed as aforesaid, to be to the use of the Owners or Setters forth of the said Ships, as they themselves shall agree, one Tenth part of the whole, heretofore allowable to the Lord Admiral, being first taken out, to be disposed by the Council of State, for such uses as the Parliament shall direct and appoint.

Proviso for ships of the well-affected taken and retaken.; Paying Salvage.

Provided always, That if any Prize or Prizes so taken, or any part thereof, shall appear, and be proved in the said Court of Admiralty to be any Ship or Goods belonging to any of the well-affected and good people of this Commonwealth, remaining and continuing under the Obedience and Protection of the Parliament, and before taken or surprized from them by any Enemy or Rebel, or disaffected person, and afterwards again surprised and retaken by any of the Fleet or Ships imployed in the Service of the Parliament, or any private Man of War, allowed as aforesaid, That then such Ships and Goods, and every such part and parts belonging to the said good people aforesaid, shall be Adjudged to be restored, and shall be by Decree of the said Court of Admiralty accordingly restored to such former Owner or Owners, paying for and in lieu of Salvage, onely one Eighth part of the true value thereof; unless such Ships so retaken shall appear to have been after their taking by the Enemy, or Rebels, or Disaffected, furnished and set forth by them as Men of War on their behalf: In which case the true and first Owners to whom the same shall be restored, shall be Adjudged to pay, and shall pay for Salvage the full Moyety of the true value of the said Ships so retaken and restored.

Council of State to give license to trade with those Islands.

Provided nevertheless, and it is further Enacted, That the Council of State for the time being have hereby Power to grant License and Leave to any of the Ships of this Nation to go to, and Trade at Barbada's, Antego, Bermuda's, Virginia, or any of them, without prejudice or damage, Any thing in this Act to the contrary notwithstanding.

Further power to the Council.

And it is further Enacted by the Authority aforesaid, That the said Council of State have hereby Power and Authority to send Ships to any of the Plantations aforesaid, and to grant Commission or Commissions to such person or persons as they shall think fit, with power to enforce all such to obedience as do or shall stand in opposition to the Parliament or their Authority; and to grant Pardons, and to setle Governors in all or any the said Islands, Plantations and places, and to do all just things, and use all lawful means to setle and preserve them in peace and safety, until the Parliament shall take further or other order therein, Any Letters Patents, or other Authority formerly granted or given to the contrary notwithstanding.

This Act to be published upon the Exchange.

And to the end that due intimation and publication of this Act may be made, and publique notice thereof be taken, so that none may justly plead excuse through ignorance of the same, Be it Ordered and Enacted, That this present Act shall be published by the Sergeant at Arms attending the Parliament, three several days upon the Exchange London, at the time of the Concourse of Merchants thither.

== See also ==
- English overseas possessions in the Wars of the Three Kingdoms
- English Civil War
- Wars of the Three Kingdoms
