= Eleutheran Adventurers =

Group of English Puritans who left Bermuda for the Bahamas in the 1640s

The Eleutheran Adventurers were a group of English Puritans and religious Independents who left Bermuda to settle on the island of Eleuthera in the Bahamas in the late 1640s. The small group of Puritan settlers, led by William Sayle, were expelled from Bermuda for their failure to swear allegiance to the Crown and left in search of a place in which they could freely practice their faith. This group represented the first concerted European effort to colonize the Bahamas.

== Background ==
The mid-17th century was a period of destruction and turmoil in England, culminating in the English Civil War. The first part of the conflict was fought between King Charles I and the Parliament of England and led ultimately to the Protectorship of the Puritan General Oliver Cromwell. This conflict spread to Bermuda, where a period of civil strife resulted in a victory for the supporters of the royalist party, known as Cavaliers. The struggle eventually led to the expulsion of the colony's Parliamentarian Puritans and independents to the Bahamas, which the English had laid claim to in 1629 but had not permanently settled. Earlier in 1644, the Bermudian independent Puritans had sent an expedition to explore these new islands.

== Establishment of the colony ==
Sometime between spring 1646 and autumn 1648, Sayle took 70 people to settle in the Bahamas. They made landfall on the island called Cigateo, which they named Eleutheria, from the Greek word for "freedom", although the name later became Eleuthera. The island's original inhabitants, the Lucayans, had been decimated through the slaving activities of the Spanish and the numerous European diseases, especially smallpox, that followed.

Sayle and his assistant Captain Butler were the persons who began a voyage to the Bahamas in two different vessels. Sayle's vessel was called the William. During the voyage Butler and Sayle had an argument with each other about what religious freedom means. As a solution to this problem, Sayle left Butler and went forward to reach the Bahamian Islands. The settlers ran into trouble before they even landed, when they encountered a storm and their ship ran aground onto rocks, later called the Devil's Backbone, north of Spanish Wells. The adventurers found their way ashore and took refuge in what was later called Preacher's Cave, where a religious service was held every year for the next 100 years on the anniversary in thankfulness for their survival. However- although the settlers had shelter- they had lost their provisions so they had no food.

Sayle took eight men in a small boat and went to Virginia to find help, where he got a ship and supplies and went to relieve the others. More colonists expelled from Bermuda arrived in 1649 and also faced the predicament of inadequate supplies. This time it was the sympathetic Puritans of New England who rallied to their cause and collected £800 for all the supplies they needed, allowing the colony to survive. The Eleutheran people showed their thankfulness by sending the ship back to Boston filled with Braziletto wood, with instructions to sell it and donate the proceeds to Harvard University.

Another source of trouble for the colony was dissent within its ranks from the beginning. Before they had even landed, Butler made so many problems by refusing to accept authority, that Sayle and others were obliged to find another island. They named the island they moved to Sayle Island, which was later renamed New Providence. The colony was not an immediate success in economic terms. Its soil yielded little production, and the settlers barely got by during their first years, being obliged to live by salvaging what they could from shipwrecks. Sayle was able to secure supplies from the mainland colonies. Despite this, the colony did not do much better in the following years, and in the end only a few determined settlers from the original Eleutherans were left.

Sayle went on to become governor of South Carolina, but he continued to have a vested personal interest in Eleuthera. He used this influence to secure some trade for the island and so helped the community through its infancy. This episode is thought to be the historical source of Andrew Marvell's poem "Bermudas," written in praise of the Puritan settlers of the New World, and one of the earliest statements of the so-called "American Dream". According to the Norton Anthology of English Literature (7th ed., p. 1686), "The poem was probably written after 1653, when Marvell took up residence in the house of John Oxenbridge, who had twice visited the Bermudas."

== Articles of 1647 ==
The colony was to be governed by the Articles and Orders of 1647, drawn up by Sayle. The articles reflect the ambiguities of the English Civil War taking place at that time between Cavaliers and Roundheads. Therefore, while the preamble refers to the Raign of our Soveraign Lord Charles, by the Grace of God, King of England, Scotland, France, and Ireland; Defender of the Faith, &c, the articles make clear that the new settlement was to be effectively independent, making no further mention of the Crown. On the contrary, the articles speak of the rules governing the Members of the Republick and the Magistracie or officers of the Republicke. The articles established freedom of religion and opinion, three hundred acres of land per settler, governance under a governor and twelve councillors chosen from a senate composed of the first 100 settlers, and humane treatment of any indigenous people still on the island. It has been noted that if Sayle's settlement had been successful, then he would have created in the Bahamas "the first democratic state in the New World", some 130 years before the American Revolution.
