= Robert MacGregor Stewart =

Senior British Army officer

Major General Sir Robert MacGregor Stewart GCB
- Born: 28 August 1842; County Galway, Ireland
- Died: 22 October 1919 (aged 77) Kensington, London, England
- Allegiance: United Kingdom
- Branch: British Army
- Service years: 1860–1909
- Rank: Major General
- Awards: Knight Grand Cross of the Order of the Bath

Major General Sir Robert MacGregor Stewart GCB (28 August 1842 – 22 October 1919) was a senior British Army officer who served as Governor of Bermuda from 1904 to 1907.

== Biography ==
Stewart was born in County Galway, Ireland, the son of John Stewart. Stewart received a commission in the Royal Artillery, becoming a lieutenant on 18 September 1860. He served extensively in colonial conflicts in British India and Africa, including in the Second Anglo-Afghan War, the Mahdist War and the Hazara Expedition of 1888. In March 1894, Stewart was appointed an aide-de-camp to Queen Victoria, he was made a Companion of the Order of the Bath in the 1893 Birthday Honours, and in March 1894 he was appointed Commandant of the Royal Artillery School of Gunnery. In August 1902, he was made a Knight Commander of the Order of the Bath and in April 1904 he was appointed Governor of Bermuda. In this capacity, he recommended to the Colonial Office against forming the Bermuda Cadet Corps for white boys to the exclusion of coloured boys. He served as governor until 1907, after which he served as Lieutenant of the Tower of London until August 1909. In June 1909 was made Colonel Commandant of the Royal Artillery. Stewart was made a Knight Grand Cross of the Order of the Bath in the 1911 Coronation Honours.

Government offices
Preceded by Sir Henry Geary	Governor of Bermuda; 1904–1907	Succeeded by Sir Josceline Wodehouse
