= George James Bruere =

Governor of Bermuda (1721–1780)

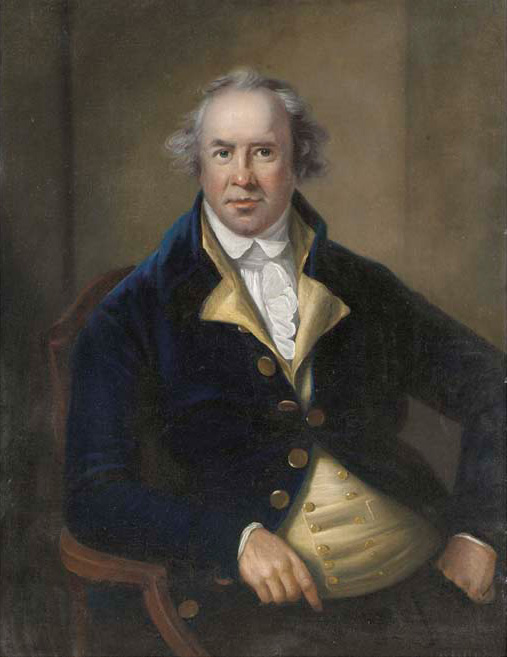
A portrait of Bruere by John Russell

Lieutenant-Colonel George James Bruere (c. 1721 – 10 September 1780) was a British Army officer and colonial administrator who served as governor of Bermuda from 1764 until his death in 1780. Of all Bermuda's governors since 1612, his term of office was the longest. He had a difficult time during the American Revolutionary War and is thought to have died of chronic stress caused by the interplay of Bermudians and American rebels.

== Life ==
Born about 1721, on 17 July 1743 Bruere married Elizabeth Neale, daughter of Richard Neale by his marriage to Anne Pendock, in St Mary's Church, Nottingham, England.

After an early career as a British Army officer, Bruere was appointed Governor of Bermuda in 1764. Previously serving in the army with the rank of lieutenant colonel, he arrived in Bermuda on the Prince of Wales in August 1764, bringing with him his wife and nine children.

He has been described as "a benign, simple and kindly man with a large family" and by the historian Sir John William Kaye as "a staunch royalist... loyal to the core". However, Kaye reports further that -

Of this Governor Bruere the colonial annalists relate that he was a man of an irascible temper and overbearing disposition, living and ruling in a perpetual state of antagonism with the Assembly and the People. He was a soldier, and a good one; but he was habituated to command, and impatient of opposition.

=== Governorship of Bermuda ===
On taking up his appointment as governor, Bruere was taken aback by the way slaves were treated in the Bermuda islands. He made a speech to the House of Assembly of Bermuda in 1766 in which he proposed the need for stricter controls, including "...haveing the Doors lock'd where they are, under the inspection of a white Person". Familiar with the control of slaves in other colonies, he advised the Bermudians:

Bring your Negroes to a better regularity and due obedience... prevent their unlawfull Assemblys, Thefts, and pernicious practices of leaving their Masters Houses and going to meetings... by night.

On 21 March 1767, the House of Assembly resolved to appoint a Committee consisting of its Speaker and eleven other members to address King George III on "the tyranny and oppression of the Governor" if they deemed it necessary during the House's adjournment.

Bruere was interested in agriculture, and he and his wife bought 60 acres (240,000 m^{2}) of land to the north of St George's to grow grapes, hoping to produce the equivalent of Madeira.

=== American War of Independence ===
On 20 August 1774, Bruere wrote to the Colonial Secretary, the Earl of Dartmouth, that some Bermudians were showing sympathy for the rebellion on the North American mainland:

As the People here, have thought themselves of Sufficient Consequence, to Choose Delegates, and Address the Congress at Philadelphia, I hope the Government will think they have Sufficient Reason to put some Check upon them and Support the few Officers of Government.

In 1775, after the Battle of Lexington, the Continental Congress announced a trade embargo against British colonies remaining loyal to the Crown. Bermuda offered to supply the Patriots with salt, but they were unimpressed and asked for gunpowder. Meanwhile, in June 1775 Bruere lost his son John, who was killed fighting on the British side at the Battle of Bunker Hill. On 14 August, to the fury of Bruere, Bermudians sympathetic to the Revolution stole the island's supply of gunpowder from the Powder Magazine in St George's and shipped it to the rebels. Trade with Bermuda developed, for which Bruere was not blamed in London.

This was despite the implication of his Bermudian relatives in the act of treason. The President of the Governor's Council, and occasional acting governor, was Henry Tucker, the husband of Bruere's daughter, Frances. Henry's father, a Colonel of the Militia, as well as Henry's brother, St. George Tucker, were suspected of involvement in organising the gunpowder theft. Colonel Henry Tucker had been one of the Bermudian delegates to the Continental Congress, and had met with Benjamin Franklin, with whom he is believed to have orchestrated the gunpowder theft. St. George had moved to Virginia to study law in 1772. He later moved to South Carolina, which had been colonised from Bermuda in 1670 by William Sayle (and which still had a sizeable and important enclave of Bermudians). He served during the American War of Independence as a colonel in the Virginia Militia. Another of Henry's brothers, Thomas Tudor Tucker, had emigrated to the continent before the war, and was serving in the rebel administration (he later became the longest serving Treasurer of the United States, as well as serving as a US Congressman and Senator). It has been suggested that George Washington (possibly unaware of the plotting of Franklin and Colonel Tucker) wrote the letter addressed to the people of Bermuda, which had sparked the treason, at the suggestion of Thomas, and that it had been delivered into the hands of his relatives in Bermuda. The theft, during which a visiting French officer was murdered and buried on the spot, was organised by persons highly-enough placed that no one was ever prosecuted.

The letter from Washington had read:

To THE INHABITANTS OF THE ISLAND OF BERMUDA

Camp at Cambridge 3 Miles from Boston, September 6, 1775.

Gentn: (In the great Conflict, which agitates this Continent, I cannot doubt but the Assertors of Freedom and the Rights of the Constitution, are possessed of your most favorable Regards and Wishes for Success. As Descendents of Freemen and Heirs with us of the same Glorious Inheritance, we flatter ourselves that tho' divided by our Situation, we are firmly united in Sentiment; the Cause of Virtue and Liberty is Confined to no Continent or Climate, it comprehends within its capacious Limits, the Wise and good, however dispersed and separated in Space or distance.) You need not be informed, that Violence and Rapacity of a tyrannick Ministry, have forced the Citizens of America, your Brother Colonists, into Arms; We equally detest and lament the Prevalence of those Councils, which have led to the Effusion of so much human Blood and left us no Alternative but a Civil War or a base Submission. The wise disposer of all Events has hitherto smiled upon our virtuous Efforts; Those Mercenary Troops, a few of whom lately boasted of Subjugating this vast Continent, have been check'd in their earliest Ravages and are now actually encircled in a small Space; their Arms disgraced, and Suffering all the Calamities of a Siege. The Virtue, Spirit, and Union of the Provinces leave them nothing to fear, but the Want of Ammunition, The applications of our Enemies to foreign States and their Vigilance upon our Coasts, are the only Efforts they have made against us with Success. Under those Circumstances, and with these Sentiments we have turned our Eyes to you Gentlemen for Relief, We are informed there is a very large Magazine in your Island under a very feeble Guard; We would not wish to in volve you in an Opposition, in which from your Situation, we should be unable to support you: -- We knew not therefore to what Extent to sollicit your Assistance in availing ourselves of this Supply; -- but if your Favor and Friendship to North America and its Liberties have not been misrepresented, I persuade myself you may, consistent with your own Safety, pro mote and further this Scheme, so as to give it the fairest prospect of Success. Be assured, that in this Case, the whole Power and Execution of my Influence will be made with the Honble. Continental Congress, that your Island may not only be Supplied with Provisions, but experience every other Mark of Affection and Friendship, which grateful Citizens of a free Country can bestow on its Brethren and Benefactors. I am &c.

In 1776, in the course of the American Revolutionary War, Admiral Lord Howe sent two Royal Navy sloops of war, HMS Nautilus (1762) and Galatea, to Bermuda with the task of stopping the trade between Bermuda and the Colonies in rebellion. In 1777, American forces (reportedly Bermudian expatriates, familiar with local waters) briefly seized control of the fort and battery near Wreck Hill on Bermuda's Somerset Island, a strategic position for the protection of the West End Channel, one of the few passages through the ring of reefs. The Bermudian militia men retreated, and the Americans spiked the fort's guns and destroyed its walls, then withdrew before local forces could retaliate. Between 1778 and 1780, Bruere commissioned several privateers, which were fitted out in Bermuda, "to cruise against the French, Spanish, and Americans".

During the early years of the war, however, when rebel sympathy was strongest, Bermudians reportedly built large numbers of Bermuda sloops for sale to the Americans, via neutral ports, for use as privateers.

=== Death ===
Exhausted by his last years in office, Bruere became ill in July 1780, probably a result of chronic stress, and he died in St George's on 10 September 1780, at the age of fifty-nine. He was later said by the historian Henry Wilkinson to be "the victim in the eyes of his family of five years of incessant strain and foul play", in particular caused by the dealings of the islanders with the rebel colonists. Perhaps because he was said to have died of yellow fever, he was buried under the floor of St. Peter's Church, St. George's.

Sir John William Kaye noted that

In spite... of the internecine strife into which he plunged the islands, he governed them for nearly twenty years, and might have governed them still longer, but that, in the very crisis of the warfare, he was suddenly removed by death.

Bruere was succeeded as governor by his son, George Bruere (1744–1786), who as a lieutenant in the 18th Regiment of Dragoons had been wounded at Bunker Hill, and who in 1777 had married Martha Louisa Fatio, then aged fourteen. The younger Bruere was Lieutenant Governor of the Bermudas from 1780 to 1781. A surviving portrait of Bruere (pictured) is attributed to John Russell, RA and now hangs in the Tucker House Museum (located in the former home of President Henry Tucker), St. George's.

In 2008, Bruere's skeleton was unexpectedly found under the floorboards of St Peter's Church when archaeologists from Boston University were searching for evidence of the foundations of the original church on the site, built in 1612. His wooden coffin had crumbled away, but a copper plate supposed to be from the top of the coffin was found in the skeleton's chest cavity, bearing the inscription "His Excellency / George James Bruere ESQr / Governor of Bermuda / And Lieut. Colol. In His/ Majestys Service OB / The 10 September 1780/ AE 59 Years". The vicar of the church commented that he had no record of the funeral. From the bones, it was estimated that Bruere was 5 feet 4 inches (1.63 m), in height, which was about the average for the 18th century.

== Children ==
Bruere had at least nine children: William; George Bruere Jr. (ca. 1744–1786); John (killed at the Battle of Bunker Hill, 1775); Frederick; Elizabeth; Pendock; Frances (born 18 May 1749, Bermuda, died 20 November 1813, Cheltenham); Charlotte (born 1762, at Alderston, East Lothian, died 22 February 1827); and James (1765–1838).

Bruere's son William Bruere became secretary to the Government of the Bengal Presidency of British India and a member of the Council of India. He married Anne Sadleir, and their daughter Nancy Sadleir Bruere married in 1804 William Otter, later Principal of King's College London and Bishop of Chichester.

== See also ==
- History of Bermuda
