= Henry Tucker (Bermudian politician, born 1742) =

Bermudian politician (1742–1808)

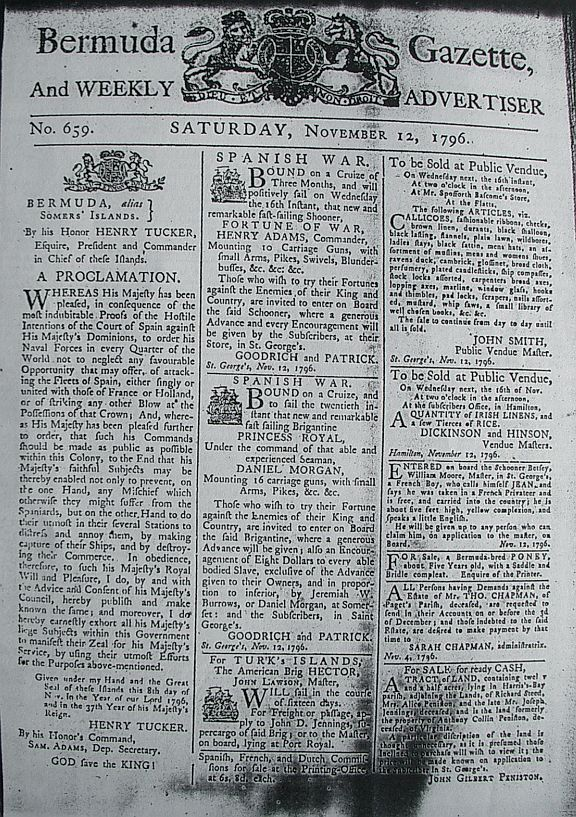
Bermuda Gazette of 12 November 1796, with a proclamation in the name of Henry Tucker, calling for privateering against Spain and its allies during the 1796 to 1808 Anglo-Spanish War.

Henry Tucker (13 February 1743 - 3 February 1808) was a Bermudian politician, and a member of a family that had been prominent in Bermuda since the 1616 appointment of Captain Daniel Tucker as Governor of Bermuda. Henry Tucker was the President of the Governor's Council of the British colony of Bermuda (which had combined the roles of a Cabinet and an Upper House to the House of Assembly of Bermuda) from 1775 to 1807. Prominent men at that time filled a variety of civil and military roles by appointment, and Tucker was also appointed the Colonial Secretary of Bermuda and Provost Marshal General of Bermuda after the resignation of W. O'Brien from those positions in 1785. He was acting Governor of Bermuda in 1796, pending the arrival of new Governor William Campbell. Campbell died almost immediately upon arrival and Tucker resumed the acting Governorship from 1796 to 1798, and again from 1803 to 1805, and in 1806.

Henry's father was Henry Tucker of The Grove, at various times a Member of the Council, of the House of Assembly, and an officer of the Militia who would rise to the rank of Colonel. Bermuda's closest links were with the southern British colonies in North America, especially Virginia (of which it had originally been a part) and South Carolina (which, as part of the Province of Carolina had been settled from Bermuda in 1670 under William Sayle, and still had a sizeable and influential enclave of Bermudians). Bermudians had abandoned agriculture after the 1684 dissolution of the Somers Isles Company, and had developed a maritime economy. Bermudians built large numbers of ships, including the Bermuda sloop, with which they explored every opportunity to exploit distant markets. This meant, however, that they became completely dependent on trade for foodstuffs and basic supplies, and their primary trading partners were the now rebellious American colonies. The ban on trade with the rebels that followed the outbreak of the war meant Bermuda was faced with economic ruin and famine. Colonel Henry Tucker was sent as a Bermudian delegate to the rebel Continental Congress in Philadelphia, where he orchestrated with Benjamin Franklin the theft of a hundred barrels of gunpowder from a magazine in St. George's, Bermuda. The gunpowder was stolen during the night of the 14 August 1775, and rowed out to waiting American vessels which delivered it to the rebel army, even as another rebel vessel was sent to Bermuda by George Washington tasked with the same mission. Washington was unaware of Tucker and Franklin's plot, and sent a letter addressed to the people of Bermuda requesting their assistance.

The letter from Washington had read:

To THE INHABITANTS OF THE ISLAND OF BERMUDA

Camp at Cambridge 3 Miles from Boston, September 6, 1775.

Gentn: (In the great Conflict, which agitates this Continent, I cannot doubt but the Assertors of Freedom and the Rights of the Constitution, are possessed of your most favorable Regards and Wishes for Success. As Descendents of Freemen and Heirs with us of the same Glorious Inheritance, we flatter ourselves that tho' divided by our Situation, we are firmly united in Sentiment; the Cause of Virtue and Liberty is Confined to no Continent or Climate, it comprehends within its capacious Limits, the Wise and good, however dispersed and separated in Space or distance.) You need not be informed, that Violence and Rapacity of a tyrannick Ministry, have forced the Citizens of America, your Brother Colonists, into Arms; We equally detest and lament the Prevalence of those Councils, which have led to the Effusion of so much human Blood and left us no Alternative but a Civil War or a base Submission. The wise disposer of all Events has hitherto smiled upon our virtuous Efforts; Those Mercenary Troops, a few of whom lately boasted of Subjugating this vast Continent, have been check'd in their earliest Ravages and are now actually encircled in a small Space; their Arms disgraced, and Suffering all the Calamities of a Siege. The Virtue, Spirit, and Union of the Provinces leave them nothing to fear, but the Want of Ammunition, The applications of our Enemies to foreign States and their Vigilance upon our Coasts, are the only Efforts they have made against us with Success. Under those Circumstances, and with these Sentiments we have turned our Eyes to you Gentlemen for Relief, We are informed there is a very large Magazine in your Island under a very feeble Guard; We would not wish to in volve you in an Opposition, in which from your Situation, we should be unable to support you: -- We knew not therefore to what Extent to sollicit your Assistance in availing ourselves of this Supply; -- but if your Favor and Friendship to North America and its Liberties have not been misrepresented, I persuade myself you may, consistent with your own Safety, pro mote and further this Scheme, so as to give it the fairest prospect of Success. Be assured, that in this Case, the whole Power and Execution of my Influence will be made with the Honble. Continental Congress, that your Island may not only be Supplied with Provisions, but experience every other Mark of Affection and Friendship, which grateful Citizens of a free Country can bestow on its Brethren and Benefactors. I am &c.

His father's activities were not the extent of the treasons of President Henry Tucker's family. Two of his brothers, St. George Tucker and Thomas Tudor Tucker, had emigrated to the continent before the war, and both served the rebels. St. George was a Lieutenant-Colonel in the Virginia Militia, and was wounded at both the Battle of Guilford Court House and the Siege of Yorktown. Thomas Tudor served as a surgeon in the Continental Army from 1781 to 1783. He was a South Carolina delegate to the Continental Congress in 1787 and 1788, and later represented South Carolina in the United States House of Representatives, and served as Treasurer of the United States from 1801 to his death in 1828.

Bermuda remained a British colony after the war, and became the lynch pin of the Royal Navy's control of North American and West Indian waters after the loss of all her continental bases between The Maritimes and the West Indies, with increasing interest and interference taken by the British Government in its internal self-government. The loyalties of Bermudians were considered highly suspect after the war, during which they had traded with the rebels and supplied them with large numbers of fighting ships, in addition to stolen gunpowder. The activities of his father and brothers might have cast a shadow on Henry Tucker's political career, but he was advantageously married to Frances Brueure, the daughter of the wartime Governor, Lieutenant-Colonel George James Bruere. Brueure was Bermuda's longest-serving governor, having been appointed in 1764. His death in office in 1780 was thought to have resulted from the stress of governing a colony that was almost in rebellion. He was succeeded by his son, Lieutenant George Brueure (1744–1786), of the 18th Regiment of Dragoons, who had been wounded at the Battle of Bunker Hill. Tucker's brother-in-law had a short Governorship, having set himself against the elder Henry Tucker and the other members of Bermuda's economic and political elite.
