= George Bruere Jr. =

Governor of Bermuda (1780–1782)

George Bruere Jr
- Born: 1744; England
- Parents: George James Bruere (father); Elizabeth Neale (mother)

George Bruere Jr. was a British politician and soldier who served as Governor of Bermuda from 1780-1782. He was the son of George James Bruere, the longest-reigning Governor in Bermudian history. A staunch loyalist, Bruere was despised, and eventually deposed, for his punitive action against the Bermudian merchant class, who broadly supported the Thirteen Colonies in the American Revolution.

== Biography ==
George Bruere Jr. was born in 1744 in England. His father was George James Bruere, an army officer who in 1764, was appointed as the Governor of Bermuda. George Jr. also served in the British Army, seeing action at the Battle of Bunker Hill where he was wounded.

When his father died in 1780, Bruere Jr. surmised that it was from the stress of running the tumultuous colony of Bermuda, which had been facing plagues, famines, and interior strife throughout the American Revolution.

Bruere was appointed to succeed his father in 1780. As Governor, Bruere Jr. increased the British naval presence on the archipelago by building new outposts and demoted rebellious colonial officers and politicians, replacing them with avowed loyalists.

Bruere's policies, though hated by Bermuda's pro-American merchants and mariners opened up new opportunities for wartime Bermuda, including privateering, which had been suppressed by whiggish officials such as political fixture Henry Tucker and colonial Chief Justice George Bascome.

Bruere was removed from his post in 1782 and replaced in interim by Thomas Jones, a colonial legislator. This move was celebrated by Bermuda's business class, who burned Bruere in effigy and briefly imprisoned him. In a later missive relayed to the Earl of Portsmouth, Bruere accused Henry Tucker, and Jones of conspiring with the rebels.

The next gubernatorial appointee was William Browne a judge and merchant from Massachusetts Bay Colony. Browne utilized the loyalist reforms made by Bruere to strengthen ties to Great Britain while using his mercantile background to placate the more pro-American Bermudians.
