= Thomas Tudor Tucker =

American politician

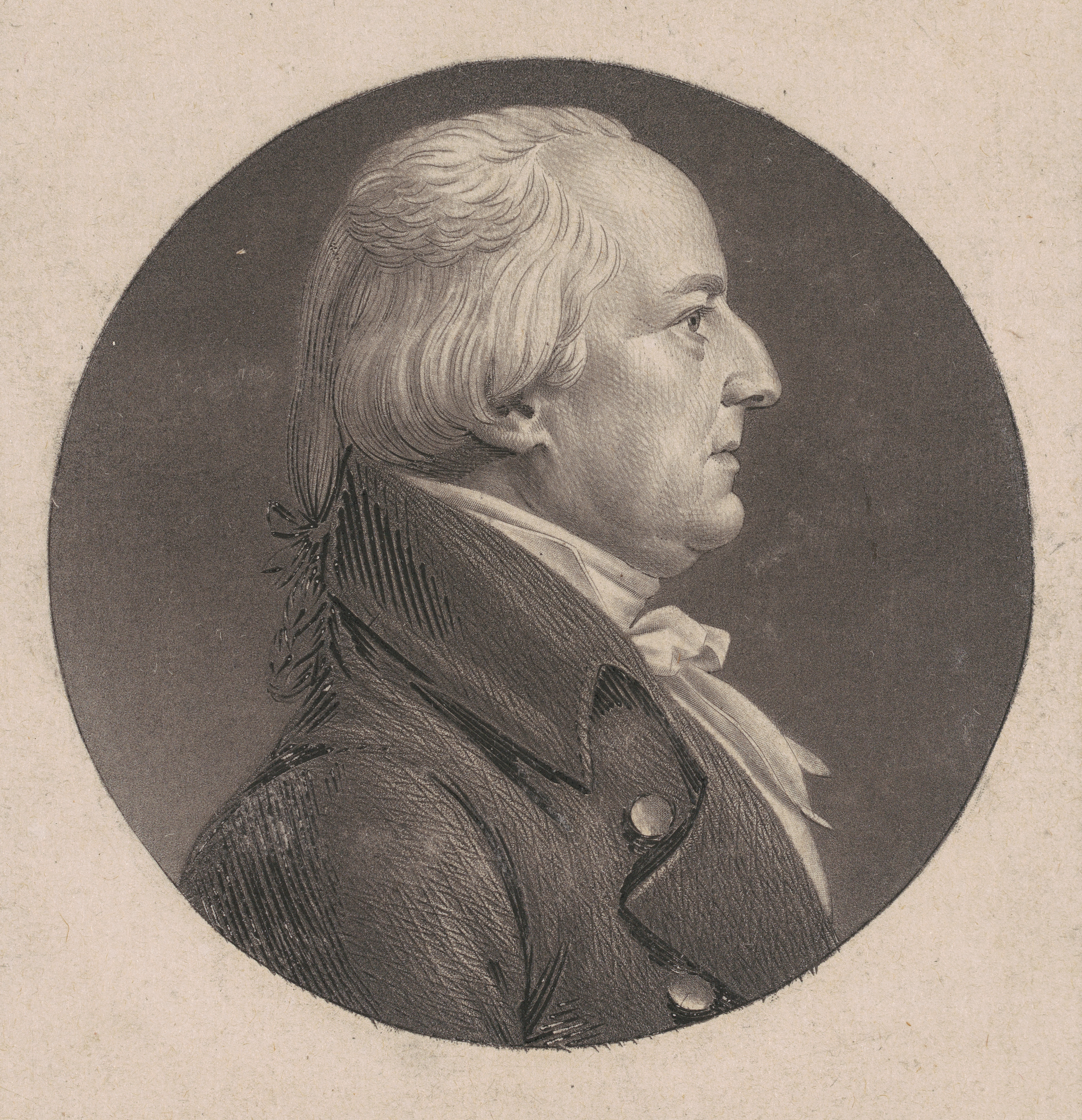

3rd Treasurer of the United States
- In office December 1, 1801 – May 2, 1828
- President: Thomas Jefferson; James Madison; James Monroe; John Quincy Adams
- Preceded by: Samuel Meredith
- Succeeded by: William Clark

Member of the U.S. House of Representatives from South Carolina's 5th district
- In office March 4, 1789 – March 3, 1793
- Preceded by: Position established
- Succeeded by: Alexander Gillon

Delegate from South Carolina to the Congress of the Confederation
- In office November 5, 1787 – October 21, 1788

Member of the South Carolina House of Representatives from St. George's, Dorchester Parish
- In office February 28, 1787 – January 5, 1789
- In office January 4, 1785 – January 1, 1787
- In office January 8, 1782 – January 6, 1783

Member of the South Carolina House of Representatives from St. John's, Colleton Parish
- In office March 26, 1776 – October 20, 1776

Personal details
- Born: June 25, 1745 St. George's, Bermuda
- Died: May 2, 1828 (aged 82) Washington, D.C., U.S.
- Resting place: Congressional Cemetery, Washington, D.C.
- Party: Anti-Administration
- Education: University of Edinburgh
- Profession: doctor

Military service
- Allegiance: United States of America
- Branch/service: Continental Army
- Years of service: 1781–1783
- Rank: surgeon
- Battles/wars: American Revolutionary War

Thomas Tudor Tucker (June 25, 1745 – May 2, 1828) was a Bermuda-born American medical doctor and politician representing Charleston, South Carolina. He was elected from South Carolina in both the Continental Congress and the U.S. House. He later was appointed as Treasurer of the United States and served from 1801 to his death in 1828, establishing a record as the longest-serving treasurer.

== Biography ==
Thomas was born in St. George's, Bermuda to a family prominent in that colony since his ancestors emigrated from England in 1662. His parents were Henry and Ann Tucker. As a youth, Thomas studied medicine at the University of Edinburgh in Scotland. After graduating in 1770, he moved first to Virginia in the 1760s, then settled in Charleston, South Carolina (which had been settled from Bermuda in 1670, under the leadership of William Sayle, and which had a large community of expatriate Bermudians) and opened a practice. His younger brother St. George Tucker followed him to Virginia, studying law and eventually being appointed as Chief Justice of the Virginia Supreme Court.

Tucker was an early supporter of the cause of American independence. He was elected to the South Carolina House of Representatives in 1776, and served there in various years until 1788. In 1781 he joined the Continental Army as a hospital surgeon supporting the Southern Department, and served until 1783. South Carolina sent him as a delegate to the Continental Congress in 1787 and again in 1788. He is believed to have played a key role in a plot to supply the rebel army with gunpowder stolen from a British magazine in his Bermudian homeland.

In 1775, after the Battle of Lexington, the Continental Congress announced a trade embargo against British colonies remaining loyal to the Crown. Bermuda, with its control of the Turks Islands, and a large merchant fleet, offered to supply the Patriots with salt, but they were unimpressed and asked for gunpowder. Meanwhile, in June 1775, the fiercely loyal Governor of Bermuda, George James Bruere, who had lost one of his sons, John, who was killed fighting on the British side at the Battle of Bunker Hill, was enraged when, on August 14, Bermudians sympathetic to the Revolution stole the island's supply of gunpowder from the Powder Magazine in St George's and shipped it to the rebels. Trade with Bermuda developed, for which Bruere was not blamed in London.

This was despite the implication of his Bermudian relatives in the act of treason. The President of the Governor's Council, and occasional acting Governor of Bermuda, was Bruere's son-in-law, Henry Tucker, who was Thomas T. Tucker's older brother. Most notably, among other prominent Bermudians, their father, a Colonel of the Militia, as well as their brother, St. George Tucker, were believed to have been involved in organising the theft. Thomas Tudor Tucker is believed to have suggested that George Washington write the letter, addressed to the people of Bermuda, which had sparked the act of treason, and that it had been delivered into the hands of his relatives in Bermuda. The plot was organised by persons highly-enough placed that no one was ever prosecuted.

The letter from Washington had read:

To THE INHABITANTS OF THE ISLAND OF BERMUDA

Camp at Cambridge 3 Miles from Boston, September 6, 1775.

Gentn: (In the great Conflict, which agitates this Continent, I cannot doubt but the Assertors of Freedom and the Rights of the Constitution, are possessed of your most favorable Regards and Wishes for Success. As Descendents of Freemen and Heirs with us of the same Glorious Inheritance, we flatter ourselves that tho' divided by our Situation, we are firmly united in Sentiment; the Cause of Virtue and Liberty is Confined to no Continent or Climate, it comprehends within its capacious Limits, the Wise and good, however dispersed and separated in Space or distance.) You need not be informed, that Violence and Rapacity of a tyrannick Ministry, have forced the Citizens of America, your Brother Colonists, into Arms; We equally detest and lament the Prevalence of those Councils, which have led to the Effusion of so much human Blood and left us no Alternative but a Civil War or a base Submission. The wise disposer of all Events has hitherto smiled upon our virtuous Efforts; Those Mercenary Troops, a few of whom lately boasted of Subjugating this vast Continent, have been check'd in their earliest Ravages and are now actually encircled in a small Space; their Arms disgraced, and Suffering all the Calamities of a Siege. The Virtue, Spirit, and Union of the Provinces leave them nothing to fear, but the Want of Ammunition, The applications of our Enemies to foreign States and their Vigilance upon our Coasts, are the only Efforts they have made against us with Success. Under those Circumstances, and with these Sentiments we have turned our Eyes to you Gentlemen for Relief, We are informed there is a very large Magazine in your Island under a very feeble Guard; We would not wish to in volve you in an Opposition, in which from your Situation, we should be unable to support you: -- We knew not therefore to what Extent to sollicit your Assistance in availing ourselves of this Supply; -- but if your Favor and Friendship to North America and its Liberties have not been misrepresented, I persuade myself you may, consistent with your own Safety, pro mote and further this Scheme, so as to give it the fairest prospect of Success. Be assured, that in this Case, the whole Power and Execution of my Influence will be made with the Honble. Continental Congress, that your Island may not only be Supplied with Provisions, but experience every other Mark of Affection and Friendship, which grateful Citizens of a free Country can bestow on its Brethren and Benefactors. I am &c.

Tucker was opposed to the United States Constitution, believing that it gave too much authority to the central government. He was elected to the United States House of Representatives and served in the first two congresses from 1789 until 1793.

On December 1, 1801 President Jefferson appointed Tucker as Treasurer of the United States. He held that post through four administrations (Jefferson, Madison, Monroe, and J.Q. Adams), serving until his death in 1828. Tucker holds the record as the longest-serving Treasurer: 26 years, 153 days. During this time, he also served as physician to President Madison (1809–1817).

Tucker died while in office at Washington, D.C., and is buried in the Congressional Cemetery. His nephew, Henry St. George Tucker, Sr., was a U.S. Congressman from Virginia. His nephew Thomas Tudor Tucker stayed with the Bermuda branch of the family and served as an admiral in the British Navy.

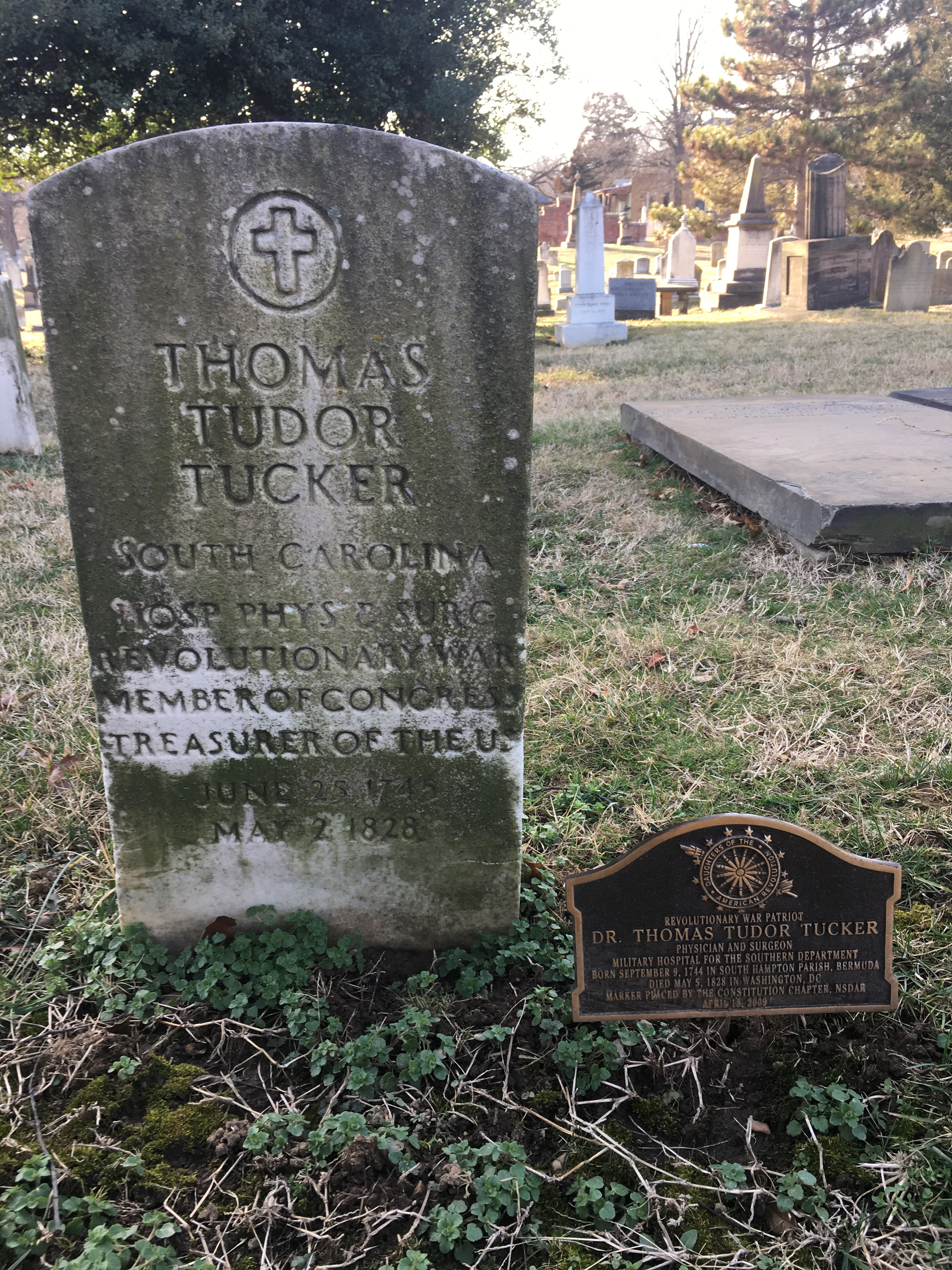
The gravestone of Thomas Tucker at Congressional Cemetery

== Works ==
Tucker published an oration that was delivered in Charleston before the South Carolina Society of the Cincinnati (Charleston, 1795).

U.S. House of Representatives
Preceded by Position established	Member of the U.S. House of Representatives from South Carolina's 5th congressional district 1789–1793	Succeeded by Alexander Gillon
Political offices
Preceded by Samuel Meredith	Treasurer of the United States; 1801–1828	Succeeded by William Clark
