= St. George Tucker =

American judge

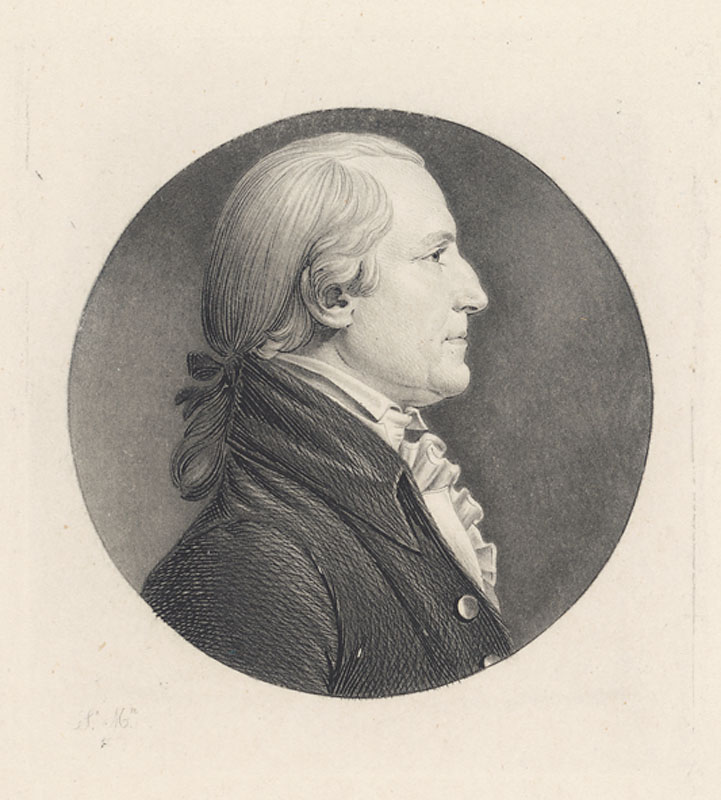
- Portrait by Charles Balthazar Julien Févret de Saint-Mémin.

Judge of the United States District Court for the Eastern District of Virginia
- In office February 4, 1819 – June 30, 1825
- Appointed by: operation of law
- Preceded by: Seat established by 3 Stat. 478
- Succeeded by: George Hay

Judge of the United States District Court for the District of Virginia
- In office January 19, 1813 – February 4, 1819
- Appointed by: James Madison
- Preceded by: John Tyler Sr.
- Succeeded by: Seat abolished

Justice of the Virginia Supreme Court
- In office April 11, 1804 – April 2, 1811

Personal details
- Born: St. George Tucker; July 10, 1752 Port Royal, Bermuda
- Died: November 10, 1827 (aged 75) Warminster, Virginia
- Party: Democratic-Republican
- Relations: Theodorick Bland
- Children: Henry St. George Tucker Sr. Nathaniel Beverley Tucker; John Randolph (step child)
- Parent: Henry Tucker (father)
- Relatives: Thomas Tudor Tucker; Henry Tucker; George Tucker; John Randolph Tucker; Nathaniel Beverley Tucker; Henry St. George Tucker III
- Education: College of William & Mary
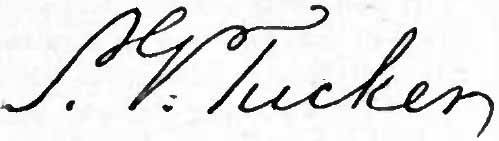
- Signature

St. George Tucker (July 10, 1752 – November 10, 1827) was a Bermudian-born American lawyer, military officer and professor who taught law at the College of William & Mary. He strengthened the requirements for a law degree at the college, as he believed lawyers needed deep educations. He served as a judge of the General Court of Virginia and later on the Virginia Supreme Court of Appeals (now the Supreme Court of Virginia).

Following the American Revolutionary War, Tucker supported the gradual emancipation of slaves, which he proposed to the state legislature in a pamphlet published in 1796. He wrote an American edition of Blackstone's Commentaries on the Laws of England that became a valuable reference work for many American lawyers and law students in the early 19th century. President James Madison in 1813 appointed Tucker as a United States district judge of the United States District Court for the District of Virginia, later serving on the United States District Court for the Eastern District of Virginia. Many of his descendants became notable lawyers, professors and politicians.

== Early life ==
Coat of Arms of St. George Tucker

Tucker was born near Port Royal, Bermuda, to English colonists Anne Butterfield (d. 1797) and Colonel Henry Tucker (1713–1787). His father was the great-grandson of George Tucker, who emigrated to Bermuda from England in 1662. The Tuckers were well-regarded in Port Royal. St. George's older brother Thomas Tudor Tucker migrated to Virginia in the 1760s after completing medical school in Scotland, and settled in South Carolina before the American Revolutionary War. Another brother was Henry Tucker, the President of the Council of Bermuda and occasional acting Governor of Bermuda. Another famous relative was his cousin George Tucker, a politician and writer, who was helped by him at the beginning of his career. The name St. George had been in the family since his great-great-grandfather George Tucker married Frances St. George.

As a young man of 19, Tucker moved to the Colony of Virginia in 1772 to study law under George Wythe. Upon arriving in Williamsburg, Tucker entered the College of William & Mary, where he was a member of the F.H.C. Society. After six months at the college, Tucker took private law lessons from Wythe. Tucker passed the bar on April 4, 1774, on the verge of the American Revolutionary War.

In 1774, as tensions with London increased, many Virginia county courts closed in response to the Stamp Act, as did the General Court of Virginia in 1775 (and did not re-open for three years). Tucker needed to find alternatives to practicing law in Virginia. Tucker returned to Bermuda and obtained an attorney's and solicitor's license there, but was not able to drum up much business. Tucker joined his father and his brother Thomas in a business smuggling goods between the West Indies and the American colonies in Virginia and South Carolina.

== Militia officer ==
During the American Revolutionary War, Tucker was commissioned into the Virginia militia as a major under the command of General Robert Lawson; Lawson's troops joined Nathanael Greene's army in North Carolina. Tucker distinguished himself at the Battle of Guilford Court House, where he was wounded in the leg while trying to stop a fleeing Virginian soldier. After recovering, Tucker returned as a lieutenant colonel under Lawson. At the Siege of Yorktown in 1781, an exploding shell wounded Tucker, who was serving as an interpreter for Governor and General Thomas Nelson Jr. and his French allies.

== Lawyer ==
Tucker resumed his fledgling legal career in Virginia after the Revolution's end in 1782, when the United States achieved independence. He began practicing before the Chesterfield County Court in 1783. The Virginia Court of Admiralty admitted Tucker to its bar in 1785, and the General Court of Virginia in Richmond did likewise in 1786.

The Virginian bench, bar, and government soon took notice of Tucker. In 1782 he presented an amicus argument before the Virginia Court of Appeals in the case of Commonwealth v. Caton (a.k.a. The Case of the Prisoners), one of the earliest American cases discussing judicial review. In Caton, Tucker argued for the courts' rights to exercise judicial review, based on the separation of powers doctrine. A pamphlet Tucker wrote in 1785 argued for a common American commercial policy and earned Tucker a position as one of Virginia's delegates to the Annapolis Convention, along with James Madison and Edmund Randolph. By 1787, the governor asked Tucker to substitute for the Attorney General before the Court of Appeals in the case of Commonwealth v. Posey, in which a county magistrate appealed his arson conviction for burning down the county jail and clerk's office.

== Professor ==
Tucker was elected to the College of William & Mary's Board of Visitors in 1782. He attended many meetings, and protected the college's curriculum from conservative clergy on the board. Tucker became the college's rector in 1789, When George Wythe resigned in 1790, the Board of Visitors awarded Tucker an honorary Doctor of Civil Laws degree and named him the new professor of law and police at an annual salary of £120.

Tucker used William Blackstone's Commentaries on the Laws of England as the basis of his course at the college, but added discussion on how the Commentaries differed from United States law. Tucker also added lectures on principles of United States government, and told his students that the laws passed by United States legislatures, both state and federal, would be more important in his course than the authorities whose treatises were the traditional resources for learning about the English common law. Along those lines, Tucker's course would discuss how civil law principles had replaced common law ones in United States jurisprudence since the Revolution. Tucker's course also discussed other important topics of the day such as the abolition of slavery. Parts of Tucker's lectures showed that states' rights were an important principle to him.

According to historian Clyde N. Wilson, Tucker's principles of states' rights and limited government would be prevailing ideas for him and other Jeffersonians for several generations. Legal historian Paul Finkelman and law professor David Cobin note, though, that Tucker was a "moderate states' rights advocate" and supporter of union, close to the philosophy of people such as John Marshall, and that he opposed concepts such as nullification that would be endorsed by later supporters of states' rights.

Tucker initially arranged his classes into winter and summer sessions to avoid conflict with his judicial service. Originally, Tucker scheduled three-hour lectures three times a week during both sessions, but by 1798 he had added two lectures to the winter session and eliminated the summer session, since not all students would be in Williamsburg then. During sessions, Tucker's students usually read during the times they did not attend lectures. Students were also expected to study outside of sessions by reading the great treatises on English law. Tucker usually had students numbering in the mid-teens, even in the later part of the 1790s, when the college's total attendance was only about 50. Under Tucker's professorship, the college awarded its first Bachelor of Law (LL.B.) degree to William H. Cabell, who would become Governor of Virginia, then General Court judge, and finally a justice of the Supreme Court of Appeals of Virginia.

During Tucker's time as Professor of Law and Police, students who wished to get a Bachelor of Laws from William & Mary also needed to fulfill the requirements for a Bachelor of Arts, as well as be "acquainted with civil history, both ancient and modern, and particularly with municipal law and police."

Tucker wanted to increase the requirements for a Bachelor of Laws, and so he created a "Plan for Conferring Degrees on the Students of Law in the University of William and Mary". Under Tucker's plan, students would be required to attend two full years' worth of courses, or the majority of three years' worth. Students would be expected to know ancient and modern history, politics, and constitutions (with special emphasis on the Virginia state and United States federal constitutions); and they would also have to "be well-versed in" ethics, municipal laws, and British laws still in effect in Virginia, as well as rules of practice in the Commonwealth. A professor would conduct a closed-book oral exam of the student on a topic of the professor's choosing; if a student passed the professor's exam, the student would apply to practice law before either the County Courts or Court of Appeal of Virginia. If admitted to practice, the student would write a thesis. Once the thesis was approved by the professors and printed, the college would award the student a Bachelor of Laws. Tucker's plan provided for Bachelor of Laws recipients to receive a Master of Arts degree with two more years of residence at the college, or by taking an exam after four years if they were away. Students who received the Bachelor of Laws could also earn a Doctor of Laws degree by taking an exam after four more years of residing and studying at the college, after eight years away from the college, or after five years of practicing before a superior court. Judges and attorneys who practiced before the superior courts of Virginia for at least seven years would be eligible for an honorary Doctor of Laws degree.

Tucker strongly believed that future attorneys needed a proper legal education before beginning to practice, and would sometimes even cover students' fees to keep them from dropping out. Tucker's reputation quickly grew, and the college soon took in law students from other states, and even from overseas. Attorneys would sometimes recommend a term of Tucker's courses to people reading the law under them.

Tucker taught his courses from his home in Williamsburg so that he could have his full library, an extensive and well-regarded collection of Virginia and United States law and the law of nations, close at hand. In November 1801, the college's Board of Visitors adopted a resolution requiring all professors to hold their lectures on campus. Tucker complied for a bit, but then returned to teaching his courses at his home.

In July 1803, the Board of Visitors resolved that they should specifically notify Tucker about their earlier decision regarding lecture locations; in addition, all College professors were now required to submit attendance rolls to the Board at each meeting and to arrange to visit every student's room at the college at least twice per week. This combination of new requirements was the last straw for Tucker, who believed that the new duties demonstrated "perfect contempt" from the Board for the college's professors. Tucker resigned, effective March 1804, to avoid troubles for his current students.

== Judicial service ==
=== General Court of Virginia ===
Tucker was elected by the legislature as a judge of the General Court of Virginia in Richmond, serving from 1788 to 1803. While serving on the General Court, Tucker continued his efforts at reforming the Commonwealth's legal system. Among other items, he proposed bills to decentralize the Virginia Court of Chancery, reorganize the District Courts of Virginia, and improve the jury selection process in the state; ultimately, though, the Virginia General Assembly never passed any of Tucker's proposals into law. From 1789 to 1792, Tucker served as one of the revisors tasked with creating a long-desired code of the laws then in effect in Virginia. Tucker also wrote several pamphlets during this time, including a discussion as to what extent the United States had adopted the common law, and several works under the pseudonym "Columbus" in support of the Democratic-Republican Party. Tucker also published a pamphlet under the name "Sylvestris", proposing that the Louisiana Territory be considered for settlement by free blacks.

=== Virginia Supreme Court of Appeals ===
Justice Edmund Pendleton of the Virginia Supreme Court of Appeals died on October 23, 1803, and on January 6, 1804, the General Assembly elected Tucker to the state Supreme Court of Appeals (known since 1970 as the Virginia Supreme Court), choosing him over Archibald Stuart of Staunton by a vote of 115–82. By this time, Tucker was known for writing extremely thorough opinions that analyzed numerous angles on every issue involved in the case; however, unlike many of his colleagues on the Court of Appeals, he would not deliver his opinions in seriatim if he felt a single, unified court opinion would do. In 1808, Tucker crafted another piece of proposed legislation that would have greatly reduced the number of mandatory appeals a party was entitled to, both in an effort to reduce the Court of Appeals's caseload and to curtail what Tucker saw as pointless delay tactics by parties that only served to clog the court system. The Virginia Assembly rejected this proposal, along with Tucker's idea of splitting the Court of Appeals into legal and chancery divisions.

During his tenure, Tucker ruled in the notable case of Hudgins v. Wright (1806), a freedom suit in which his former mentor George Wythe had decided in favor of freedom for the slave Jackey Wright and her two children. She had sued for freedom based on her grandmother's and great-grandmother's American Indian ancestry, as Virginia had ended Indian slavery in 1691 or 1705, depending on interpretation.

Based on the Court of Appeals record, Wythe appears to have based his ruling on two elements: that the three Wrights appeared white and their master had not proved that they were slaves or of African descent, and that residents of Virginia had a presumptive right to freedom based on the 1776 Declaration of Rights of the state. The Wrights' master Houlder Hudgins appealed the case.

Tucker and the other appellate judges (all slaveholders) disagreed with Wythe's argument that blacks could be presumed free at birth (as were whites). They noted that Africans ("negroes, Moors and mulattoes") had been brought into the state only as slaves and were non-Christian. Tucker wrote that the Declaration of Rights applied only to "free citizens, or aliens only", and could not be applied like a "sidewind" to overturn the "rights of property" in slaves. The justices affirmed freedom based on the Wrights' Indian ancestry and the fact that Indian slavery had ended in Virginia, plus the appellant's failure to prove any African ancestry on the maternal side.

Increasing tensions with fellow justice Spencer Roane and frustration with some of the General Assembly's efforts at judicial reform, which included a recommendation that Court of Appeals justices be required to live in Richmond, led Tucker to resign from his position shortly after the new session began in March 1811. John Coalter, Tucker's son-in-law, was selected to fill the now-empty position on the bench.

=== Federal judicial service ===
After Tucker resigned as justice in 1811, he returned to private practice in Williamsburg. Tucker was nominated by President James Madison on January 18, 1813, to a seat on the United States District Court for the District of Virginia vacated by Judge John Tyler Sr. Tucker was hesitant to accept the nomination, but his friend William Wirt, along with financial circumstances, convinced him to accept. He was confirmed by the United States Senate on January 19, 1813, and received his commission the same day. Tucker was reassigned by operation of law to the United States District Court for the Eastern District of Virginia on February 4, 1819, to a new seat authorized by 3 Stat. 478. His service terminated on June 30, 1825, due to his resignation. Tucker's health had begun to fail in 1822, as did his wife Leila's a couple of years later, which led to Tucker's resignation.

Among other duties, Tucker's role as United States District Judge included sitting on the United States Circuit Court for the District of Virginia in Richmond with Chief Justice John Marshall.

Although Tucker was one of the most well-respected legal thinkers of his day, he would never be appointed to the Supreme Court of the United States, quite possibly because there were already two Virginians (John Marshall and Bushrod Washington) serving there at the time.

== Marriage and family ==
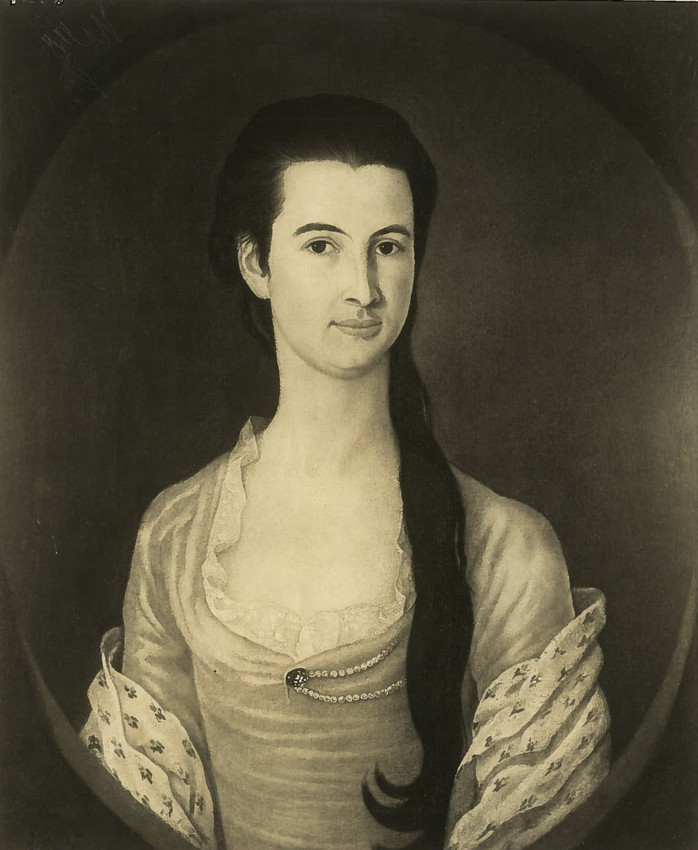
Frances Bland Randolph Tucker, portrait by John Durand

In 1778, Tucker married Frances (Bland) Randolph, a wealthy young widow who was the daughter of Theodorick Bland of Cawsons and mother of three young boys, Richard, Theodorick, and John. He moved to her plantation, Matoax, in Chesterfield County. Tucker and Frances had three sons and two daughters together, Henry St. George Tucker Sr., Nathaniel Beverley Tucker, Theodorick Thomas Tudor Tucker, Anne Frances Tucker, and Elizabeth Tucker. Frances died in 1788 after giving birth to Elizabeth.

After Frances's death, Tucker left Matoax for a house facing the Palace Green and Market Square in Williamsburg; this house remains today on the grounds of Colonial Williamsburg as the St. George Tucker House. In 1791, Tucker married Leila Skipwith Carter, a widow who was previously married to George Carter, descendant of Robert "King" Carter. Leila and her two children, Charles and Mary "Polly" Carter, joined Tucker and his children in Williamsburg. After Tucker retired from the bench in 1825, he and Leila would alternate time between their home in Williamsburg and a cottage on the Edgewood estate. Tucker suffered a stroke in 1827, dying six weeks later on November 10, 1827.

== Notable descendants ==
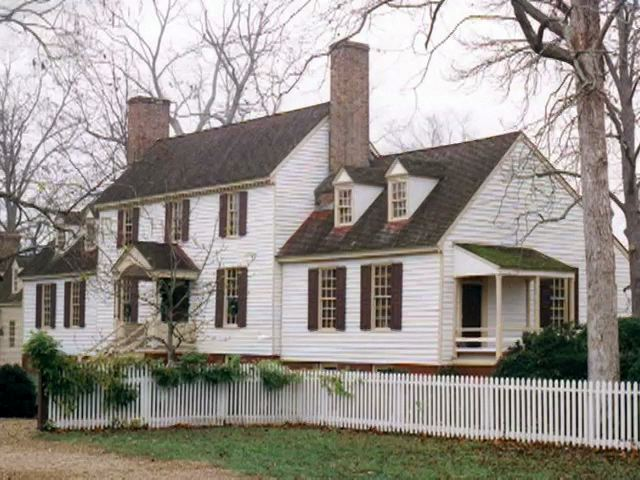
Tucker’s home in Williamsburg, Va.

Tucker became the first of many generations of legal scholars and politicians who would have a notable impact on Virginia.

Tucker's youngest step-son, John Randolph of Roanoke (1773–1833), served as House majority leader and Chairman of the House Ways and Means Committee, as well as a United States senator representing Virginia, and later America's ambassador to Russia.

Tucker's son Henry St. George Tucker Sr. (1780–1848) served in both the state legislature and the United States House of Representatives, as well as President of the Virginia Supreme Court of Appeals, and later declined an appointment by Andrew Jackson to become United States Attorney General.

Tucker's second son, Nathaniel Beverley Tucker (1784–1851) was a professor of law at William & Mary and published works on political economy as well as literature.

His grandson, John Randolph Tucker (1823–1897), served as Virginia's attorney general, as well as United States Representative and Dean of Washington and Lee University School of Law.

His grandson, Nathaniel Beverley Tucker (1820–1890), was a newspaper editor in Washington, D.C. before the Civil War, United States counsel at Liverpool, England, and later the Confederate States' "economic agent abroad."

His great-grandson, Henry St. George Tucker III (1853–1932), served in United States House of Representatives, as Dean of Washington and Lee University School of Law and later of the George Washington University Law School.

== Gradual emancipation proposal ==
After eight years as a judge on the General Court, Tucker wrote A Dissertation on Slavery: With a Proposal for the Gradual Abolition of it, in the State of Virginia, which he then submitted to the General Assembly of Virginia. It was first published as a pamphlet in 1796 and was later appended to his edition of Blackstone's Commentaries. He said that the abolition of slavery was of "the first importance, not only to (Virginians') moral character and domestic peace, but even to our political salvation."

Tucker engaged in a considerable amount of research for the Dissertation. He wrote a number of legal scholars and practitioners in the Northern states to ask how they had ended slavery or planned to end it. Tucker's Dissertation was also likely one of the first extensively researched treatises on the history of slavery in the British North American colonies, as well as a comprehensive description of the law of slavery in Virginia at the time.

=== Criticism of slavery ===
Tucker's proposal noted that census figures at the time showed that a large number of slaves in Virginia had been emancipated, stating that the commonwealth had more "free negroes and mulattoes . . . than are to be found in the four New England states, and Vermont [where gradual emancipation plans had already commenced]." The Dissertation, though, asked Virginians to take the process further and described the moral and democratic need for the commonwealth to end slavery completely:

Whilst America hath been the land of promise to Europeans, and their descendants, it hath been the vale of death to millions of the wretched sons of Africa. . .Whilst we were offering up vows at the shrine of Liberty. . .whilst we swore irreconcilable hostility to her enemies. . .whilst we adjured the God of Hosts to witness our resolution to live free or die. . .we were imposing on our fellow men, who differ in complexion from us, a slavery, ten thousand times more cruel than the utmost extremity of those grievances and oppressions, of which we complained.

Civil rights, as we may remember, are reducible to three primary heads; the right of personal security; the right of personal liberty; and the right of private property. In a state of slavery, the two last are wholly abolished, the person of the slave being at the absolute disposal of his master; and property, what he is incapable, in that state, either of acquiring, or holding, in his own use. Hence, it will appear how perfectly irreconcilable a state of slavery is to the principles of a democracy, which form the basis and foundation of our government.

=== Predicted resistance from the Virginia General Assembly ===
Tucker expected that his plan would meet strong resistance from Virginia's elite planter society, and expected several objections from the Virginia Assembly. Abolishing slavery in Virginia would effectively eliminate a large portion of the wealth of Virginia's slaveholders, many of whom also served on the Assembly; as a side effect, a considerable share of the taxable property in Virginia would also disappear. Members of Virginia's ruling class, including Tucker, were afraid of the changes emancipation would have on their society, possibly with events such as the Haitian Revolution in mind. Many Virginians also worried that freed slaves would not want to work in the commonwealth's fields, leaving plantations with too few workers. Furthermore, Tucker noted that white Virginians' "habitual arrogance and assumption of superiority. . .unfit (them). . .for equality."

=== Plan ===
Tucker proposed the gradual emancipation of slaves, a process that other states, such as New York, began in the late eighteenth century, when some northern states abolished slavery altogether. Tucker's plan began with the manumission of all women born to slaves after the plan took effect; all the women's descendants would be born free. After being freed under the plan, women born to slaves would be obligated to serve their former master's family until the age of 28, after which time they would receive $20, some clothes, and two blankets. At least the first generation of the freed women's descendants would be "bound to service by the overseers of the poor" until age 21. Black people in Virginia would not be allowed to hold public office, nor could they own land; they would only be allowed to lease land for terms of up to 21 years. They would not be allowed to own or bear arms, except when specifically permitted by the General Assembly (and even then, Assembly authorization could only last for a three-year term). Black people would be forbidden from marrying a person outside of their race, and they could not serve as an attorney or as a juror; they would only be allowed to serve as a witness against other black people in court. In addition, black people would not be allowed to create a will; serve as a trustee, administrator, or executor; or have property held in trust for them.

=== Reaction ===
The General Assembly rejected Tucker's proposal. One member sympathetic to Tucker's cause noted that "(s)uch is the force of prejudice that in the house of delegates, characters were found who voted against the letter and its enclosure lying on the table." Tucker was severely disappointed by the reaction, and while he still lectured on the topic and distributed the Dissertation in various forms, he did not make any more proposals regarding emancipation to the Assembly.

In response to criticism that his plan was not bold enough, Tucker confessed to sacrificing some principles in order to increase the chances of his plan's passage. Tucker also acknowledged that he was not immune to prejudices himself; and that while he opposed banishing black people from Virginia, he sought with his plan to make conditions in the commonwealth such that they would want to leave on their own (Tucker suggested the then-Spanish territories of Louisiana and "the two Floridas" as possible destinations).

Despite its flaws - legal historian Paul Finkelman describes Tucker's plan as "simultaneously visionary, philanthropic, racist, vicious, utterly impractical, internally inconsistent, and hopelessly complex" - modern scholars recognize the Dissertations significance as the first genuine effort by a Southerner to effect emancipation in his state. Finkelman notes that "Tucker had the strength of character to explore the problem at least. He was a true academic intellectual who used his skills as a thinker and writer in an attempt, however futile, to stimulate a serious discussion about the problem of slavery in Virginia." Historian Clyde N. Wilson says that "[p]erhaps the most important things about Tucker's essay for later times are the following: it shows the potential in the South for constructively addressing the most difficult issue in American society before the time when it became necessary to defend against outside control; and, it demonstrates that Tucker's state rights understanding of the Constitution is not merely a rationalization in defense of slavery."

== Tucker's Blackstone ==
When he was Professor of Law and Police at the College of William & Mary, Tucker used William Blackstone's Commentaries on the Laws of England as his primary text. While Tucker considered Blackstone the best treatise to use for learning the common law, he thought it had some important weaknesses as a teaching tool for American law. None of the editions of Blackstone published in the United States actually discussed new legal developments there; they just reprinted Blackstone's discussions of English law. Tucker also felt that Blackstone's sympathy with the power of the Crown over that of Parliament would be a poor influence for a student of American legal principles. Therefore, Tucker wrote marginalia in his copy of Blackstone and read them to his classes, and added lectures on Virginian and United States federal law and comparing the American political system with its British counterpart.

In 1795, at the urging of several friends, including former Virginia governor John Page, Tucker began investigating the possibility of publishing his written works, including an edition of Blackstone with his notes and with his lectures from William & Mary added as appendixes. After a couple of unsuccessful attempts to find a printer, Tucker reached an agreement with the Philadelphia firm of Birch and Small, which paid Tucker $4000 for the book's copyright. "Tucker's Blackstone" was organized into five volumes. Each volume would begin with Blackstone's original text, with notes from Tucker added, followed by an appendix containing Tucker's lectures and writings on particular subjects. Blackstone's text was mostly arranged the same way as in the original version, but Tucker organized the appendixes to show what he felt the most important developments in American law were.

Tucker's Blackstone sold well from the beginning, and it quickly became the major treatise on American law in the early 19th century. Law reporter Daniel Call described it as "necessary to every student and practitioner of law in Virginia". Lawyers arguing before the Supreme Court of the United States would frequently cite to Tucker's Blackstone - more often than any other commentator until 1827. The United States Supreme Court itself cited Tucker's Blackstone frequently, referring to it in over forty cases, many of them significant. Modern lawyers, legal scholars, and judges still refer to this work as an important tool for determining how Americans understood both English and American law in the early days after the United States's independence.

== Works by Tucker ==
- Hansford: A Tale of Bacon's Rebellion
- Tucker's papers are held by the Swem Library of the College of William and Mary.
- Blackstone's Commentaries : with notes of reference to the constitution and laws, of the federal government of the United States, and of the Commonwealth of Virginia : with an appendix to each volume, containing short tracts upon such subjects as appeared necessary to form a connected view of the laws of Virginia as a member of the federal union, 5 vols. (Philadelphia: published by William Young Birch and Abraham Small; Robert Carter, Printer, 1803).
- The Collected Essays of St. George Tucker, Edited, with Introduction and Notes, by Carl Dolmetsch
- A dissertation on slavery : with a proposal for the gradual abolition of it, in the state of Virginia, Philadelphia: Printed for Mathew Carey ... , 1796.
- Letters on the Alien and Sedition Laws, 1799
- The Poems of St. George Tucker of Williamsburg, Virginia, 1752-1827, collected and edited by William S. Prince. New York: Vantage Press, 1977.
- The Probationary Odes of Jonathan Pindar, Esq., a Cousin of Peter's, and a Candidate for the Post of Poet Laureate, to the C. U. S. In Two Parts, a volume of political satires, 1796
- Reflections on the cession of Louisiana to the United States by Sylvestris. Washington, D.C.: Samuel Harrison Smith. 1803.
- Reflections on the Policy and Necessity of Encouraging the Commerce of the Citizens of the United States of America. Richmond, Va., 1785.
- St. George Tucker's Law Reports and Selected Papers, 1782-1825 (3 vols., Chapel Hill, N.C.: Univ. of North Carolina Press, 2013). Publishes the notebooks Tucker created containing his summaries of cases heard in Virginia courts, as well as some opinions and court memorandums written by Tucker. Introductory biographical section by Charles F. Hobson.
- View of the Constitution of the United States with Selected Writings (Indianapolis: Liberty Fund 1999) (1803). Reprints an appendix from "Tucker's Blackstone" discussing the United States federal constitution. Footnotes edited for modern readers and lists of resources used by Tucker added. Foreword and commentary by Clyde N. Wilson.

== Sources ==
- 8 Va. (4 Call) xxviii (1833).
- "Randolph, John, 1773-1833". Biographical Directory of the United States Congress. Government Printing Office.
- Coleman, Mary Haldane (1938). St. George Tucker: Citizen of No Mean City. Richmond, Va.: Dietz Press.
- "Tucker-Coleman Papers", Special Collections Research Center, Swem Library, College of William & Mary.
- "George Wythe". William & Mary Law. College of William & Mary Law School. Archived from the original on 18 June 2012.
- "St. George Tucker". Colonial Williamsburg. Colonial Williamsburg Foundation.
- Commonwealth v. Posey, 8 Va. (4 Call) 109 (1787).
- Cover, Robert M. (1975), Justice Accused: Antislavery and the Judicial Process, New Haven and London: Yale University Press.
- Cullen, Charles T. (1982). "St. George Tucker". In W. Hamilton Bryson (ed.). Legal Education in Virginia 1779-1979: A Biographical Approach. Charlottesville, Va.: University Press of Virginia. pp. 657–686. ISBN 0813909015.
- Cullen, Charles T. (1987). St. George Tucker and Law in Virginia, 1772-1804. New York: Garland Publishing, Inc. ISBN 0824082567.
- Commonwealth v. Caton, 8 Va. (4 Call) 5 (1782).
- Doares, Robert (Jr.). "The Life and Literature of Nathaniel Beverley Tucker". CW Journal. Colonial Williamsburg Foundation.
- Douglas, Davison M. (2006). "Foreword: The Legacy of St. George Tucker". William and Mary Law Review. 47: 1111–1121.
- Finkelman, Paul (2006). "The Dragon St. George Could Not Slay: Tucker's Plan to End Slavery". William & Mary Law Review. 47: 1213–1243.
- Finkelman, Paul and David Cobin (1996). "An Introduction to St. George Tucker's Blackstone's Commentaries". In Tucker, St. George (1803). Blackstone's Commentaries. Philadelphia: William Young Birch and Abraham Small (Reprint 1996 Union, N.J.: Lawbook Exchange), Vol. 1, pp.i-xiii. ISBN 9781886363175. Available on Hein Online.
- Gross, Ariela J. (2008), What Blood Won't Tell: A History of Race on Trial in America. ISBN 9780674031302.
- Hamilton, Phillip (2003). The Making and Unmaking of a Revolutionary Family: The Tuckers of Virginia 1752-1830. Charlottesville, Va.: University of Virginia Press. ISBN 0813921643.
- Hobson, Charles F. (2006). "St. George Tucker's Law Papers". William & Mary Law Review. 47: 1245–1278.
- Hobson, Charles F., ed. (2013). "Biographical Overview". St. George Tucker's Law Reports and Selected Papers, 1782-1825. Chapel Hill, N.C.: University of North Carolina Press. pp. 3–19. ISBN 9780807837214.
- Hobson, Charles F., ed. (2013). "Judge of the Court of Appeals". St. George Tucker's Law Reports and Selected Papers, 1782-1825. Chapel Hill, N.C.: University of North Carolina Press. pp. 59–102. ISBN 9780807837214.
- Hobson, Charles F., ed. (2013). "Lawyer". St. George Tucker's Law Reports and Selected Papers, 1782-1825. Chapel Hill, N.C.: University of North Carolina Press. pp. 20–28. ISBN 9780807837214.
- Hobson, Charles F., ed. (2013). "United States District Court Judge". St. George Tucker's Law Reports and Selected Papers, 1782-1825. Chapel Hill, N.C.: University of North Carolina Press. pp. 103–116. ISBN 9780807837214.
- Hudgins v. Wrights (1806), 11 Va. (1 Hen. & M.) 134 (1806), available at Race and Racism in American Law, Dayton Law School, University of Dayton, accessed 26 December 2012.
- Hughes, Robert M. (1922). "William and Mary, The First American Law School". William and Mary College Quarterly. 2nd. 2: 42.
- Laughlin, Charles V. (1982). "Henry St. George Tucker". In W. Hamilton Bryson (ed.). Legal Education in Virginia 779-1979: A Biographical Approach. Charlottesville, Va.: University Press of Virginia. pp. 617–619. ISBN 0813909015.
- Laughlin, Charles V. (1982). "John Randolph Tucker". In W. Hamilton Bryson (ed.). Legal Education in Virginia 779-1979: A Biographical Approach. Charlottesville, Va.: University Press of Virginia. pp. 625–638. ISBN 0813909015.
- Lounsbury, Carl. "St. George Tucker House". Colonial Williamsburg Foundation, Research Division.
- Tate, Adam L. (2003). "Republicanism and Society: John Randolph of Roanoke, Joseph Glover Baldwin, and the Quest for Social Order". The Virginia Magazine of History and Biography. 111 (3): 263–298.
- Trask, Susan L. (1992). "In Celebration of the Bicentennial of America's First Bachelor of Law Degree Recipient, William Cabell, William & Mary LB, 1793". William & Mary Lawyer: 6–9.
- Treanor, William Michael (1994). "The Case of the Prisoners and the Origins of Judicial Review". University of Pennsylvania Law Review. 143 (2): 491–570. doi:10.2307/3312535. JSTOR 3312535. S2CID 3137789.
- Tucker, Beverley D. (1979). Nathaniel Beverley Tucker - Prophet of the Confederacy. Tokyo, Japan: Nan' Un-Do Company.
- Tucker, J. Randolph (1982). "Henry St. G. Tucker". In W. Hamilton Bryson (ed.). Legal Education in Virginia 779-1979: A Biographical Approach. Charlottesville, Va.: University Press of Virginia. pp. 602–614. ISBN 0813909015.
- Tucker, St. George (1785). Reflections on the Policy and Necessity of Encouraging the Commerce of the Citizens of the United States of America. Richmond, Va.
- Tucker, St. George (c. 1792). "Plan for Conferring Degrees on the Students of Law in the University of William and Mary". 1790–1804: St. George Tucker.
- Tucker, St. George (1796). A dissertation on slavery : with a proposal for the gradual abolition of it, in the state of Virginia. Philadelphia: M. Carey.
- Tucker, St. George (1803). Reflections on the cession of Louisiana to the United States by Sylvestris. Washington, D.C.: Samuel Harrison Smith.
- Tucker, St. George (1803). "On the State of Slavery in Virginia". In Blackstone's Commentaries. Philadelphia: William Young Birch and Abraham Small (Reprint 1996 Union, N.J.: Lawbook Exchange), Vol. 2, App. pp. 31–89. ISBN 9781886363175. Available on Hein Online.
- Tucker, St. George (1803). View of the Constitution of the United States (reprint Indianapolis: Liberty Fund 1999).
- Wilson, Clyde N., ed. (1999), View of the Constitution of the United States, (reprint Indianapolis: Liberty Fund 1999) (foreword and editor's notes).
- Wilson, J. G.; Fiske, J., eds. (1889). "Tucker, Thomas Tudor" . Appletons' Cyclopædia of American Biography. New York: D. Appleton.

Legal offices
Preceded by John Tyler Sr.	Judge of the United States District Court for the District of Virginia; 1813–1819	Succeeded by Seat abolished
Preceded by Seat established by 3 Stat. 478	Judge of the United States District Court for the Eastern District of Virginia; 1819–1825	Succeeded by George Hay
