= Daniel Tucker (colonial administrator) =

English colonial sea captain and colonial administrator

Coat of Arms of Daniel Tucker

Captain Daniel Tucker (baptized 10 April 1575, died 10 February 1625) was an English colonial sea captain, member of the Virginia Company, member of the Somers Isles Company, treasurer of the Jamestown Colony and the notorious second Governor of Bermuda.

Tucker was cape merchant (treasurer) in Jamestown during the Starving Time, and developed habits of extreme discipline.

Bermuda was settled in 1609 by the Virginia Company through the chance wrecking there of its flagship, the Sea Venture. The Virginia company's mandate was made official by the 1612 extension of its Royal Charter to include Bermuda, officially named Virginiola [sic], but quickly renamed the Somers Isles. Later that same year, Bermuda's first Governor, Richard Moore, arrived with a shipload of new settlers to join the three men left behind by the Sea Venture. Bermuda quickly became self-sufficient and its requirements were quite different from the still-struggling Jamestown. The shareholders consequently spun-off a second company to manage Bermuda separately. Called the Somers Isles Company, King James I granted it a Royal Charter in 1615, and Tucker was appointed to replace Moore as Governor.

Tucker arrived there in 1616. According to Tucker family papers, he found the people lazy and uninspired, and imposed a stern discipline on the colony that was generally resented. Within days of his arrival he had a man hanged for speaking derisively of the new governor and his methods. Governor Moore's immediate concern had been building a ring of fortifications to protect the new settlement from attack by the Spanish. Planting of crops had been neglected, with settlers relying largely on fishing, hunting and foraging. Tucker's Virginia experience had taught him that food was essential to a successful colony. Under his rule, crops were planted, rats (accidentally introduced by a visiting privateer) reduced, fishing routines established, and living accommodations were built. Tucker's insistence on the development of a reliable food and water supply before pearl diving and whaling for ambergris irritated the company shareholders, and caused his critics to proclaim that he was "fitter to be a gardener than a governor."

The Company sent Richard Norwood to survey the island in 1616, which led to a scandal when Tucker appropriated the 200 acres of overplus (surplus) shares of land left unclaimed by the survey. All shares of land were originally assigned based on Norwood's preliminary estimate of the total land area. Norwood had deliberately underestimated in order to leave a sufficient margin-of-error. Tucker was accused of first interfering with Norwood's survey to ensure that the land ultimately determined to be overplus would be a valuable tract on the boundary of Southampton and Sandys' Parishes, rather than the small, rocky islands that would otherwise have been the last surveyed, and then further accused of improperly claiming that overplus land for himself, where he built himself a mansion in 1618 with public funds. In a preface to his third survey of 1672-1673, Richard Norwood asserted that Moore had interfered with his East-to-West survey only to ensure that the small western islands, which were free of the rats that destroyed the mainland's crops, were quickly planted.

Tucker was not reappointed governor, but was replaced by Nathaniel Butler, a privateer. Although Tucker left the colony, the overplus land remained in the possession of his family for generations. This was the estate known as The Grove where Colonel Henry Tucker still lived during the American War of Independence.
