= Josceline Wodehouse =

British Army officer

General Sir Josceline Wodehouse GCB CMG
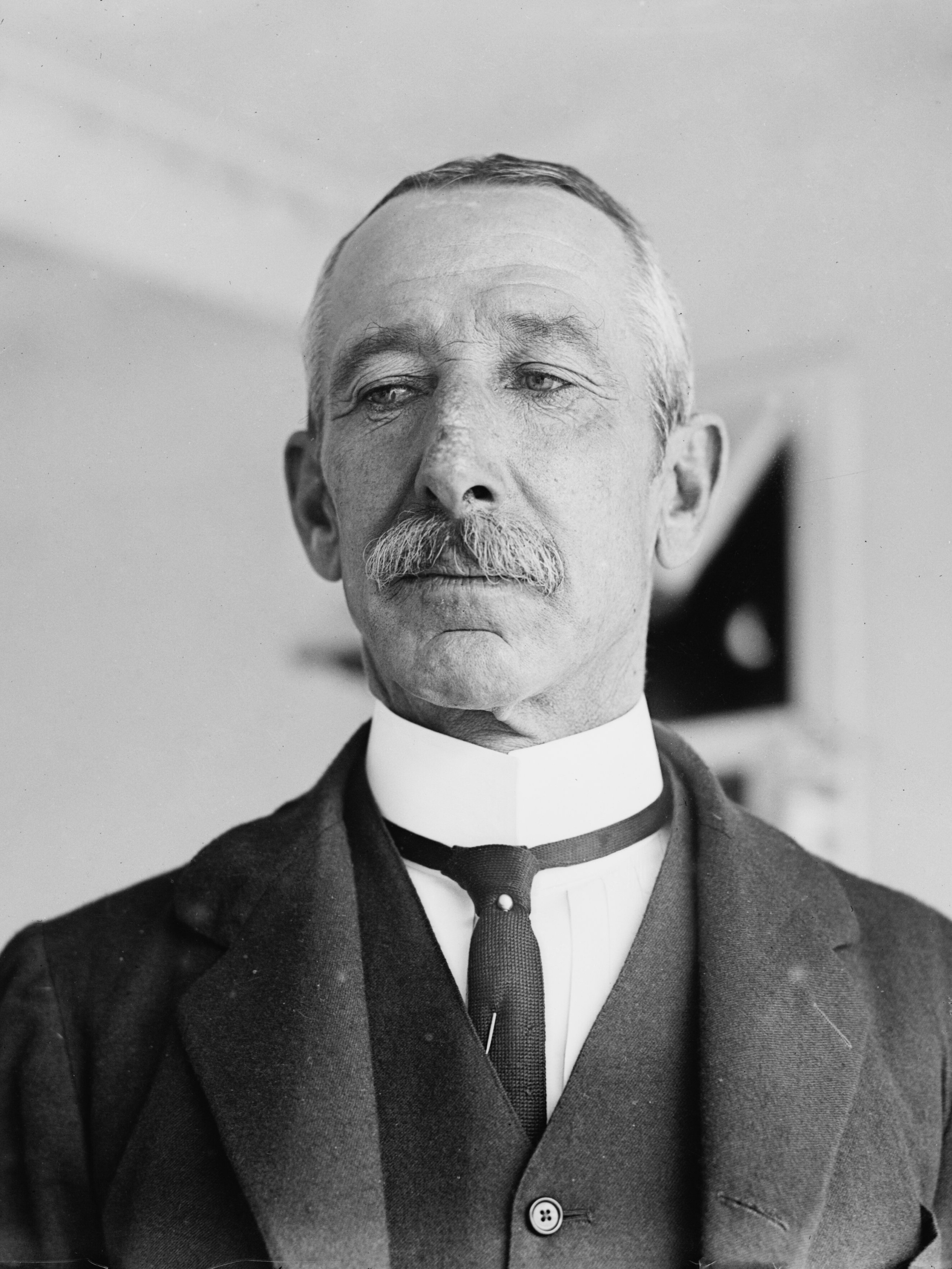
- Born: 17 July 1852
- Died: 16 January 1930 (aged 77)
- Military career
- Allegiance: United Kingdom
- Branch: British Army
- Rank: General
- Commands: Northern Army, India
- Conflicts: Anglo-Zulu War; Second Anglo-Afghan War
- Awards: Knight Grand Cross of the Order of the Bath; Companion of the Order of St Michael and St George

General Sir Josceline Heneage Wodehouse GCB CMG (17 July 1852 – 16 January 1930) was a senior British Army officer.

== Military career ==
Born the elder son of Vice-Admiral George Wodehouse and educated at the Royal Military Academy, Woolwich, Wodehouse was commissioned into the Royal Artillery in 1873. He fought in the Anglo-Zulu War in 1879.

He became Commandant of the Frontier Field Force in Egypt in 1888. When Kitchener was promoted over him to be Sirdar (Commander-in-Chief) of the Egyptian Army in 1892, he retired from the Egyptian Army and went to India where he was made Commander of the 3rd Brigade of the Malakand Field Force during the Siege of Malakand in 1897 and appointed General Officer Commanding the Presidency District of Bengal in 1898. He was a district commander in Sindh, when on 13 January 1900 he was temporary appointed in command of the Secunderabad district. A year later, on 11 April 1901, he was appointed in command of a First Class District in India (possibly Secunderabad or Lahore).

He went on to be Governor of Bermuda in 1907 and General Officer Commanding the Northern Army in India in 1908.

He retired from the army in October 1913.

== Family ==
In 1885 he married Constance D'Aguilar and in 1901 he married Mary Joyce Wilmot-Sitwell.

Military offices
Preceded by Sir Alfred Gaselee	GOC-in-C, Northern Army, India; 1908–1910	Succeeded by Sir James Willcocks
