= Henry Geary =

British Army general

Lieutenant-General Sir Henry Geary KCB
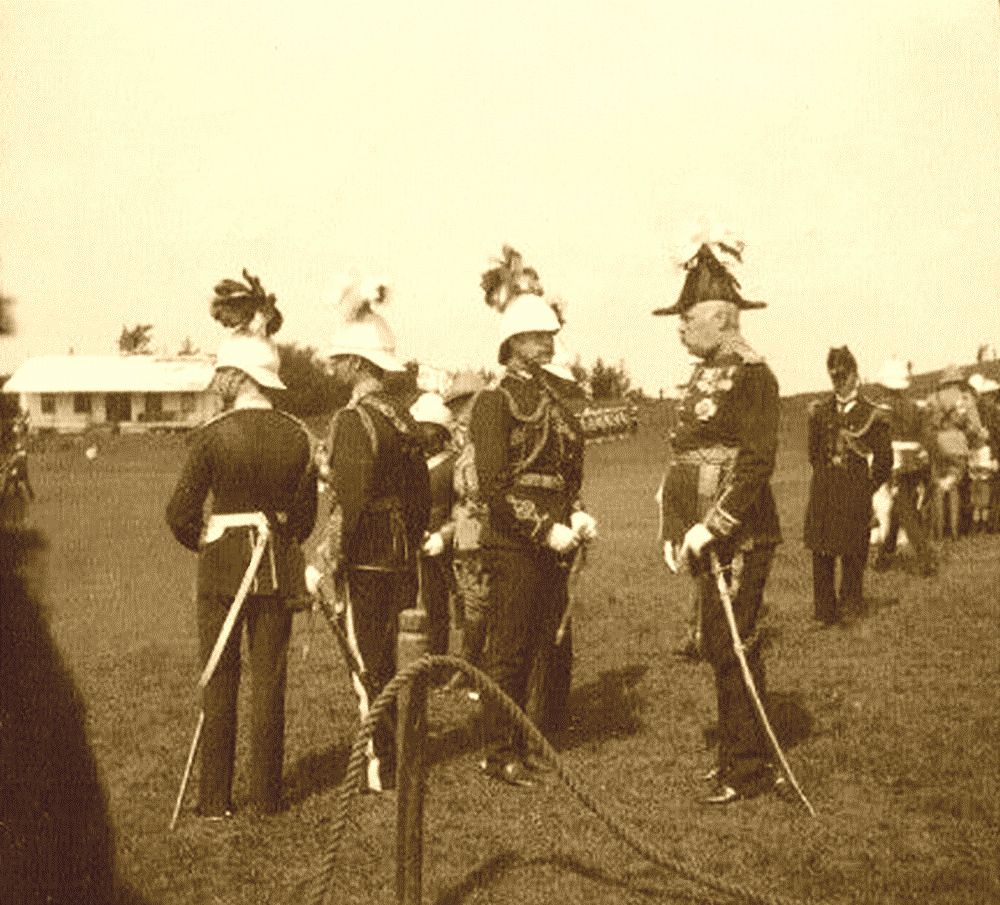
- Governor Lt. Gen. Sir Henry LeGuay Geary, KCB (right) at Prospect Camp, Bermuda.
- Born: 29 April 1837
- Died: 31 July 1918 (aged 81)
- Allegiance: United Kingdom
- Branch: British Army
- Service years: 1850–1881
- Rank: Lieutenant-General
- Awards: Knight Commander of the Order of the Bath

Lieutenant-General Sir Henry Le Guay Geary KCB (29 April 1837 – 31 July 1918) was a British Army officer.

Geary was the son of Frederick August Greary and Anne Soulsby. He was educated at the Royal Military Academy, Woolwich and commissioned into the Royal Artillery. He served in the Crimean War and was awarded the Order of the Medjidie (5th class) for distinguished conduct in the field. He subsequently served in the Indian Rebellion of 1857 and the British Expedition to Abyssinia. He held appointments in Ireland, at the Army Headquarters and the War Office before serving as President of Ordnance Committee from 1899 to 1902. In 1900 he was appointed a Knight Commander of the Order of the Bath. Geary was Governor and military Commander-in-Chief of the Imperial fortress colony of Bermuda between 1902 and 1904, which included control of the large Bermuda Garrison.
