= Governor of Bermuda =

Representative of the British monarch

- Coat of arms of Bermuda

- Flag of the governor of Bermuda

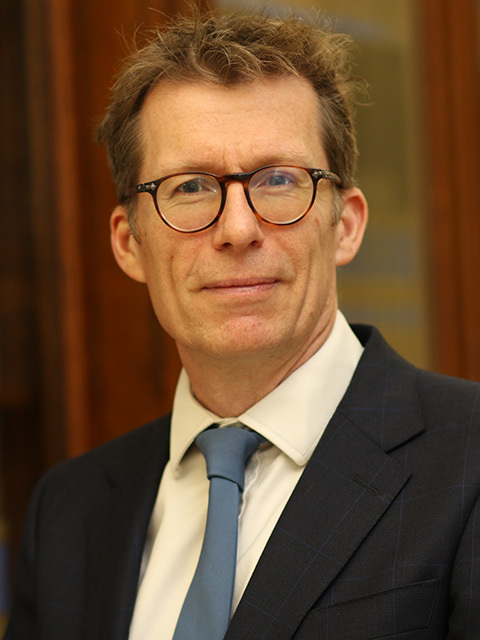
- Incumbent; Andrew Murdoch since 23 January 2025
- Viceroy
- Style: His Excellency
- Residence: Government House, Hamilton, Pembroke
- Appointer: Monarch of the United Kingdom
- Term length: At His Majesty's Pleasure
- Formation: 1612
- First holder: Richard Moore
- Website: Page on gov.bm

Flag of the governor of Bermuda, 1875–1910

Flag of the governor of Bermuda, 1910–1999

The governor of Bermuda (officially Governor and Commander-in-Chief of the Somers Isles (alias the Islands of Bermuda)) is the representative of the British monarch in the British overseas territory of Bermuda.

For the purposes of this article, Governor of Bermuda refers to the local office, although this was originally a Lieutenant-Governorship ("Lieutenant Governor and Commander-in-Chief of Our Islands in America commonly called or known by the name of the Bermuda or Summer (sic) Islands"; the Lieutenant-Governor of Bermuda was re-titled Governor of Bermuda in 1738), which – like the lieutenant-governorship of the Jamestown colony – was subordinate to the actual Governor located in England. For a period following the 1783 independence of those continental colonies that were to become the United States of America, the remaining continental colonies, Bermuda and the Bahamas were grouped together as British North America, and the civil, naval, military, and ecclesiastic government of Bermuda was made subordinate to the Captain-General and Governor-in-Chief in and over the Provinces of Upper-Canada, Lower-Canada, Nova-Scotia, and New~Brunswick, and their several Dependencies, Vice-Admiral of the same, Lieutenant-General and Commander of all His Majesty's Forces in the said Provinces of Lower Canada and Upper-Canada, Nova-Scotia and New-Brunswick, and their several Dependencies, and in the islands of Newfoundland, Prince Edward, Cape Breton and the Bermudas, &c. &c. &c., with the governor of Bermuda again becoming a lieutenant-governor. Although soon restored to a full civil Governorship, in his military role as Commander-in-chief he remained subordinate to the Commander-in-Chief in Halifax, and naval and ecclesiastic links to the Maritimes remained. The military links were severed by Canadian confederation at the end of the 1860s, when the governor of Bermuda, in his office of Commander-in-Chief of Bermuda, was elevated upon the removal of the British Army from Canada and the taking up by the Canadian Dominion Government of responsibility for the defence of all of the former British North American continental colonies excepting Newfoundland. The established Church of England in Bermuda, within which the governor held office as Ordinary, remained linked to the colony of Newfoundland under the same Bishop until 1919.

The governor is appointed by the monarch on the advice of the British government. The role of the governor is to act as the de facto head of state, and is responsible for appointing the premier and the 11 members of the Senate (the upper house of Bermuda's Parliament).

The governor is also commander-in-chief of Bermuda, formerly in control of a large Bermuda Garrison composed of regular army, militia, volunteer, and territorial units, of which only the Royal Bermuda Regiment remains. Until 1867, the governor also held the appointment of vice-admiral of Bermuda.

The current governor is Andrew Murdoch.

The governor has their own flag in Bermuda, a Union Flag with the territory's coat of arms superimposed.

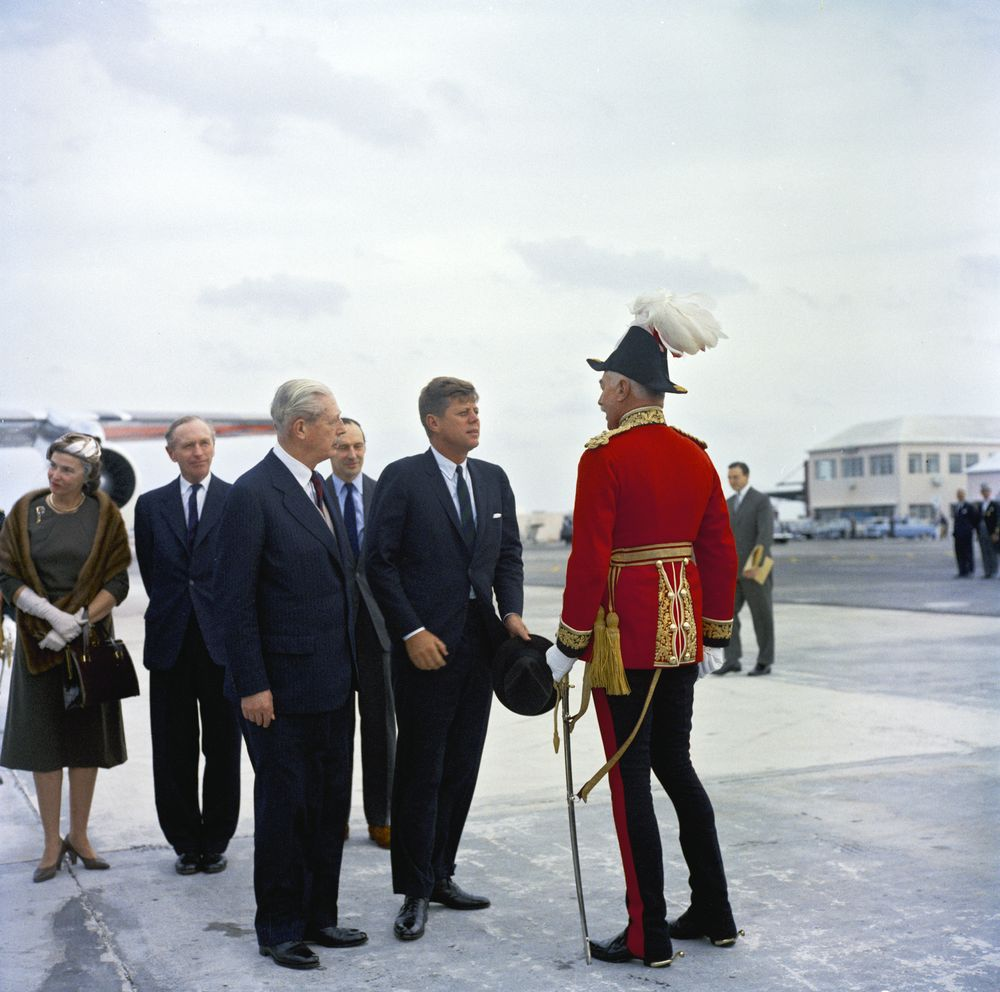
Major-General Sir Julian Gascoigne (in red uniform), Governor of Bermuda, greeting John F. Kennedy, the president of the United States, at the American Kindley Air Force Base on St. David's Island in December 1962, with Harold Macmillan, the prime minister of the United Kingdom, to the left of the president. Immediately behind are the 14th Earl of Home, the foreign secretary (standing behind Macmillan), and Sir David Ormsby-Gore, the British ambassador to the United States (standing behind President Kennedy).

== History ==
Bermuda's settlement began in 1609, with the wrecking of the flagship of the Virginia Company, the Sea Venture. Although most of the passengers and crew ultimately completed their voyage to Virginia, the archipelago was permanently settled from that point, and left in the hands of the Virginia Company. The first intentional settlers arrived in 1612, under Richard Moore, whose appointment was officially as the deputy governor of Bermuda. Sir Thomas Smith remained in England as the first governor and treasurer of Bermuda. A carpenter by trade, Moore ensured the long-term survival of the colony by concentrating on building fortifications, including the first stone forts in the English New World, and developing St. George's Town. Moore brought with him to Bermuda two consecutively numbered boxes. The first, only to be opened in the case of his death, incapacitation or absence from the colony, contained the name of the settler who was to replace him. In the case of that settler also having died, or otherwise being incapable of taking the office, a second was named in the other box. More was also instructed to appoint a Counsell of Six to assist in the governance of the colony. The six appointed Counsellors were Captain Miles Kendall, Captain John Mansfield, Thomas Knight, Charles Caldycot, Edward Waters (some records give his name as Robert Waters), and Christopher Carter (Christopher Carter and Edward Waters were among three men who had first arrived in Bermuda with the 1609 wreck of the Sea Venture. They had remained behind when the Deliverance and Patience had departed for Jamestown in 1610 with the remainder of the Sea Venture's passengers and crew, and remained again with the addition of Edward Chard, after the Patience had returned from Jamestown and departed once more in the same year for England, thereby ensuring that Bermuda has been permanently settled since the wreck of the Sea Venture).

Bermuda was the second permanent English colony established (as an extension of the first, Jamestown, Virginia, which had been settled in 1607). Bermuda was administered under Royal charters by the Virginia Company, and its successor, the Somers Isles Company, which appointed the colony's governors until the Crown revoked the charter and took over administration in 1684. With the transfer to the Somers Isles Company in 1615, Sir Thomas Smith remained in England as Governor and Treasurer of Bermuda, and Captain Daniel Tucker was sent to Bermuda in 1616 aboard the George, in consort with the Edwin, to succeed Moore as Deputy Governor. Twenty-four Assistants were also appointed. By the 1630s, the Somers Isles Company had ceased sending Governors to Bermuda and had begun appointing prominent Bermudians, such as William Sayle, to the position.

The Crown maintained the system of government established under the company: an elected parliament (originally a single House of Assembly, which held its first session in 1620) and a privy council under a governor. The Privy Council, made up of the chief justice, certain senior civil servants, and appointees, was also known as the Governor's Council and the Legislative Council (most of its responsibilities are now filled by the Cabinet and the Senate of Bermuda, with the council now only an advisory body for the governor). The last company-appointed governor was reappointed by the Crown. In 1707 the British state was created by the union of the Kingdom of England with the Kingdom of Scotland, and Bermuda thereby became a British colony. Since the 1783 independence of Virginia, it has been Britain's oldest colony. Following US independence, Bermuda became an imperial fortress, with an important Royal Navy base and a large military garrison to guard it. As such, the policy of the government until the 1950s, when the Royal Naval Dockyard was reduced to a base (in 1951) leading to the final closure of the regular army's Bermuda Garrison in 1957, had been to appoint (often retiring) senior military (or occasionally naval) officers as Bermuda's governor and commander-in-chief. On the rare occasions when a civilian was appointed to the role, it was only as governor – with operational command of the garrison in the hands of the senior lieutenant-colonel in Bermuda, who was appointed brigadier and subordinate to a military commander elsewhere. Since the 1964, those appointed governor and commander-in-chief have tended to be prominent career-politicians at the ends of their political lives.

Prior to the creation of the lower (and, originally, only) house of the Parliament of Bermuda, the House of Assembly, in 1620, the governors ruled supreme, and were often draconian. Governor Daniel Tucker, formerly of Virginia, who arrived in 1616, was notorious for his harshness, having many islanders hanged, maimed, or whipped on the slightest provocation. One Bermudian, John Wood, was hanged for airing his views on the governor in church. Governor Tucker's personal boat was reportedly stolen by five islanders, one named Saunders, who left a note saying they were on their way to England, or Davy Jones' Locker, either place being preferable to Bermuda under Tucker's rule. On reaching England, they complained about the harshness of Tucker's rule, though their complaints fell on deaf ears. Governor Tucker also, reportedly, used his oversight of the surveying of Bermuda to enrich himself and future generations of Bermudian Tuckers with prime real estate when he appropriated the overplus (surplus) land left after Richard Norwood's 1616 survey of the colony. Much of this land, forming an estate known as The Grove, would still be in the hands of his relatives during the American War of Independence.

For the remainder of the seventeenth and eighteenth centuries, the real political power in Bermuda lay in the elected parliament and the appointed Council, both dominated by members of Bermuda's wealthy commercial class. By the mid-seventeenth century, the Somers Isles Company had ceased sending governors from overseas, and instead appointed Bermudians such as William Sayle from this same local elite; a policy which ended after the Civil Wars, during which Bermuda tended to the Royalist side.

The Adventurers in England, many of whom were Parliamentarians, had exerted their authority over the preceding two decades to strangle Bermuda's emerging maritime industry, and the Bermudians' animosity towards the Adventurers in England consequently further acted to place them on the side of the Crown (The Somers Isles Company had tended towards the Royalist side in 1647, but was in the Parliamentary camp by 1649, and Robert Rich, 2nd Earl of Warwick, one of the major shareholders of the Somers Isles Company, was appointed Lord High Admiral of the Parliamentary navy from 1642 to 1649, and was related to Oliver Cromwell by the marriage of his grandson and heir to Cromwell's daughter).

In a letter to Alexander Pym at Derby House, Westminster, dated 9 May 1646, William Renner wrote:

The Government is changed. Within twenty days after his arrival, the governor called an assembly, pretending thereby to reform certain things amiss. All the ministers in the island, Mr. White, Mr. Goldinge, and Mr. Copeland, were Independents, and they had set up a Congregational Church, of which most gentlemen of Council were members or favourers. The burgesses of this assembly were picked out of those who were known to be enemies to that way, and they did not suffer a Roundhead (as they term them) to be chosen.

A Triumvirate replaced Captain Josias Forster as Governor of Bermuda in 1647. The members all being religious Independents, they established a minority rule that both the Episcopalians and the Presbyterians found tyrannical, resulting in their alliance against the Independents (whereas in England it had the Presbyterians had allied with the Independents under Parliament against the Royalist Episcopalians). To end the strife in the colony, the Somers Isles Company appointed Captain Thomas Turner Governor in 1647, and Independents were removed from Government.

A Somers Isles Company magazine ship, which had left England before the king's 30 January 1649 execution, arrived at Bermuda in March 1649, bearing news of the king's impending trial. It also bore instructions from the Company stripping the moderate Royalist Captain Thomas Turner of the office of governor (which had been filled by a succession of Bermudian settlers since the 1630s, in contrast to the company's earlier practice of dispatching governors to the colony) and ordering that the colony be governed by a triumvirate composed of the moderate Richard Norwood, Captain Leacraft (also spelt Leicroft), and Mr. Wilkinson. However, Leacraft had died before the instructions arrived, Wilkinson was a strong Independent, obnoxious to the dominant Church faction in the Council and the House of Assembly, and was not permitted by them to exercise his commission, and Norwood would not accept his own commission without Wilkinson. Captain Turner, Captain Josias Forster, and Roger Wood (all three having formerly held the office of Governor) were put forward as candidates for the governorship, which was voted upon by the other members of the council. Although Captain Richard Jennings and the Sheriff both voted for Wood, the others all voted for Turner, who reluctantly resumed the office. Turner was too moderate for most of the Royalist party, however.

News of the execution of King Charles I reached Bermuda by July, and a proposition was made to the governor and Council by the Country (analogous to the Royalist party) at a meeting on 5 July 1649:

Wee uppon sufficient grounds reports and circumstances are convinced that our Royall Souraigne Charles the first is slaine wch horrid act wee defie and detest and unwillinge to have our conscience stained with the breach of the oath (to) our god and to avoide fallinge into a premunire, acknowledge the high-borne Charles prince of Wales to be the undobted heire apparent to the kingdomes of great Brittan ffrance and Ireland wee desire the said prince accordinge to his birthright may speedily be proclaymed

2ndly. Wee desire that the oath of alledgeance and supremacy may be forthwith administerd to all people in these Islands who are capable thereof without exception and if any shall deny the taking of the said oathes or by any manner of practice whatsoever transgress against either the ptie or p.ties beinge Lawfully convict thereof, to be speedily punished accordinge as the Lawes of our nation hath provided in such cases

3rdly. Wee desire that all manner of psons whatsoever Inhabiting these Islands may accordinge to the Lawes of our nation be comanded vniformitie In matters of Church Govmt And uppon refusall of conformity to be proceeded against as our Lawes in that case hath provided

Wee desire these our Just demands and Requests may be putt into speedy execution

The answer of the governor and Council to the Country's proposition was to make Bermuda the first colony to recognize Charles II as King, and included:

give our heartie thanks for your loyaltie to the kinge and Crown of Englande wee doe acknowledge the high-born Charles Prince of Wales to be heir to the crowne and kingdome of England Scotland ffrance and Ireland after the decease of his royal father and we doe hereby declare and utter, we detest and dissent that horrid Act of Slayinge his Majtie and by the oath wch wee have taken, wee shall beare faith and alleadgiance to the Lawfulle Kinge of England his heirss and successors.

On 20 August 1649, Governor Turner ordered a proclamation to be drawn up and published (dated 21 August) requiring that, as various persons in the colony had taken the oath of supremacy and alleadgiance vunto his matie the Lawfull kinge of England and yet neuertheles they contrarye to theire oathes doe deny conformity to the lawes and Government here established, all such persons who refused conformity to the Government in both the church and state could expect no protection by virtue of any former power or order, and would face prosecution. A Mr Romer and a Thomas Wilson were imprisoned the same day for refusing to take the oath of allegiance. A Mr. Hunt was summoned before the council the same month for treasonable speeches against the king, the Parliament, and the governor. Hunt refused to accept the council's authority to question him and, having been sentenced to an hour in the pillory to be followed by imprisonment until he provided bail against his good behaviour, he refused to submit and was ordered to lie in irons until he willingly submitted.

Turner's governorship would end after Mr. Whetenhall, in the name of the Country, impeached the Reverend Nathaniel White of the Puritan party for being an enemy of the king, Company, and country. A warrant was issued for White's arrest. On 25 September 1649, the Council and Country met at the home of John Trimingham after the party in arms called The Country had arrested White under the aforementioned warrant, along with most of the Independents (who had been imprisoned in the house of a Mrs. Taylor). The Country exhibited articles against Governor Turner. Although the Council deemed the articles not to be grounds for his displacement, the Country was insistent against Turner, who therefore resigned the office of Governor. The Country then put forward John Trimingham and Thomas Burrows to the Council as candidates for Turner's replacement. The Council members elected Trimingham. On Thursday, 27 September 1649, the Army brought downe the new Gour and he tooke his oathe in the Church according to the usuall forme and vppon ffryday they marched awaye out of the towne (of St Georges) into the mayne.

Under Independent Puritan and Cromwell-loyalist William Sayle, many of the island's defeated Puritans were forced to emigrate, settling in the Bahamas as the Eleutheran Adventurers.

The Royalists in Bermuda, with control of the army (nine companies of militia and the complements of the coastal forts), were confident in Bermuda's natural and man-made defences (including a barrier reef and numerous fortified coastal artillery batteries). The Parliamentary government, however, believed the defences weak and formed plans to capture the colony.

On 18 December 1649, the Earl of Pembroke, Colonel Purefoy, Sir W. Constable, the Earl of Denbigh, Lord Whitelocke, Colonel Wanton, and Mr. Holland were appointed by the Council of State, with any three or more of them to be a committee with authority to examine the business of Bermuda. The Council of State Orders for 1 January 1650 lists:

(17) That the following Reports brought in from the Comttee Appointed for the business of the Summers Island bee approved of vizt:

(18) That the Government of the Summers Island bee setled on Capt Foster, and his Councell, as already is appointed by ye Company

(19) That all Captaines and Commanders of the Forts and Castles within ye said Island, bee nominated and appointed, by ye said Governour w[i]th the Consent of this Councell.

(20) That the said Governour and Councell, doe choose another Secretary in ye place of Vaughan if they see cause;

That the Gouernour and all other officers of Trust doe take the Engagmt according to ye order of Parliament.

That Imediatly after the Settlement of the said Governer and ye Councell, ye persons of Capt Turner, late Governour and Mr Viner the Minister bee secured, and upon Examinations and proofes taken concerning the Crimes and misdemeanours wch are informed against them, they bee forthwith sent over to England togeather wh ye said Examination & proofe.

These instructions and Forster's commission arrived in Bermuda on the 29 May 1650. Although the Country made charges against Forster and Captain Jennings on learning of this, demanding their charges be answered before the commission read, and many members of the Council denied to take notice of it because the l'tre was not directed to them with the Gour as here to fore, but eventually it was agreed to read it, and Forster was accepted as Governor.

The following day, Trimingham, Mr. Miller, Captain Jennings, and Mr. Morgan accepted the oaths of Councillors. Richard Norwood, Mr. Berkeley, and Mr. Wainwright refused. Mr. Deuitt would not accept because the company deserted him.

Despite accepting the instructions from London on the matter of the new appointments, the Government of Bermuda remained Royalist.

The Reverend Mr. Hooper informed the Council that a ship under the command of Captain Powell, with Commissioners Colonel Rich, Mr. Hollond, Captain Norwood, Captain Bond, and a hundred men aboard, was prepared to seize Bermuda.

The Act prohibiting trade with Bermuda and the other colonies considered in rebellion was passed on 3 October 1650.

In Bermuda, tailors Thomas Walker of Paget and George Washington of Hamilton were tried at the Assizes held 11–22 November 1650, on charges of being traitors against our Soveraigne Lord the Kinge.

Admiral Sir George Ayscue, in command of the task force sent in 1651 by Parliament to capture the Royalist colonies, received additional instructions from Whitehall (dated 13 February 1651) addressed to him and the other Commissioners, instructing as well to take Care for the reducemt of Bermuda's Virginia & Antego, as of the Island of Barbada's; In the case that (through the blessing of God upon yor endeavors) you shall be able to recover the Island of Barbada's unto its due subjection to this Comonwealth or after you have used your utmost dilligence to effect the same. If that you finde yorselves in a Capacity to send one or more of yo ships for the reduceing of any or all of the other plantacons to the like obedience. You are hereby Authorized and required soe to doe. And you are to make yor attempt upon the Island of Bermuda's, wch it is informed may without much strength or difficulty be gained or upon any the other plantacons now in defection as your Intelligence and opportunity shall serve. The instructions also specified that the officer in command of the force that captured a colony should then become its governor, But if either Care of the Fleet wth you or any othar important publiq service, will not admit of his Continuance there, to exercise the office & Comand of Governor thereof then it shall be lawfull for him the said Comr or commandrs in chiefe to depute & Constitute William Wilkinson of the Island of Bermudas or some other able and faithfull person to be Governor there, and to appoint such & soe many well affected & discreet persons to be a Councell for his Assistance as he thinks fit.

Barbados would surrender on 13 January 1652, but no attempt would be made to test Bermuda's defences. At a meeting of the governor and Council on 25 February 1652 (at which were present Governor Forster, Council members Captain Roger Wood, Captain Richard Jennings, Captain Thomas Turner, Captain William Seymour, Mr. Stephen Painter, Mr. William Wilkinson, Mr. John Miller, Mr. William Berkeley, Mr. Richard Norwood, and Secretary Anthony Jenour), a Generall Letter received from the company was read, which instructed them to engage to the Commonwealth of England as yt is now established without a kinge or House of Lordes, which engagement was given and a proclamation ordered by the governor explaining and commanding all inhabitants of Bermuda to take the same engagement when it should be tendered unto them.

Governors who were too high-handed or injudicious in the exercise of their office occasionally fell foul of the local political institutions. Governor Isaac Richier, who arrived in 1691, quickly made himself unpopular with his carousing and criminal behaviour. Bermudian complaints saw him placed in jail, and replaced by Governor Goddard. When Goddard proved worse than Richier, Attorney General Samuel Trott had him jailed alongside Richier. The two governors were to be tried before a pair of prominent Bermudians, John Trimmingham and William Butterfield. After Trott called the amateur judges bush lawyers, however, he found himself in St. George's jail alongside the two governors. After they confided in him their plan for escape, Trott informed the judges. Richier and Goddard were sent back to England for trial.

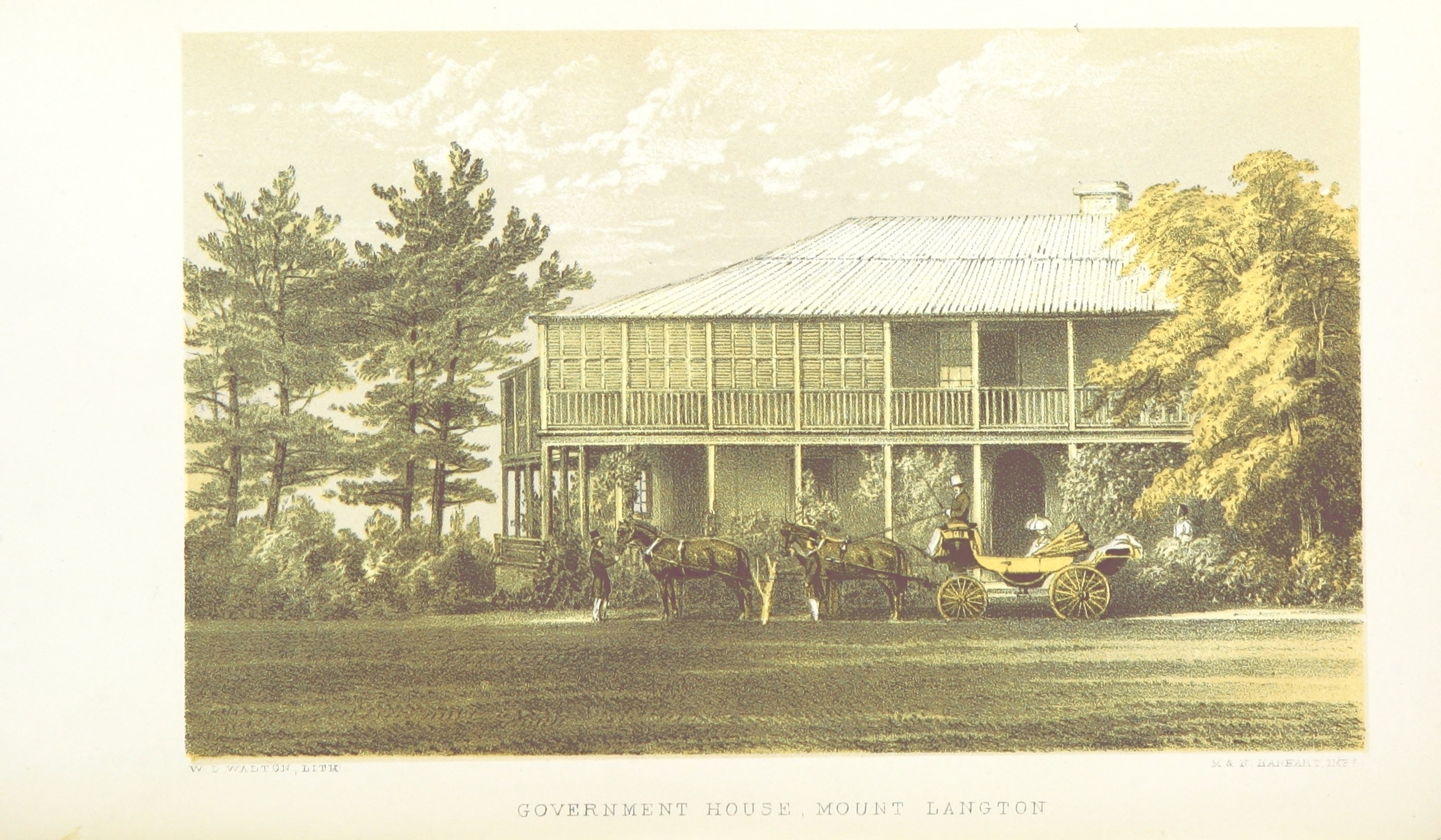
Government House, Mount Langton. This became Government House when the colonial capital was moved from St. George's to the City of Hamilton in 1815, and was replaced with the current building on the same grounds.

At the written request of George Washington, during the course of the American War of Independence, 100 barrels of gunpowder were stolen from a magazine in St. George's and provided to the American rebels. No one was ever prosecuted in relation to this act of treason. The theft had been the result of a conspiracy involving powerful Bermudians, who were motivated as much by Bermuda's desperate plight, denied her primary trading partner and source of food, as by any favourable sentiments they may have had in regard to either the American colonists or their cause. The chief conspirator was Henry Tucker of The Grove (the overplus estate appropriated in 1616 by Governor Daniel Tucker), a member of the House of Assembly, former member of the council, and militia officer (soon to be promoted to colonel), who had plotted with Benjamin Franklin while attending the rebel Continental Congress as a delegate for Bermuda. Two of his sons served in the rebel Army and were to achieve high office in the post-War US government. A third son, also named Henry Tucker, was at the time the president of the council (and later acting governor on multiple occasions), and married to the daughter of Governor George James Bruere. Following this, Bermudians and their political institutions were looked at suspiciously by the British government.

With the build-up of the naval and military bases on the island following American independence, the position of the governor was enhanced. Despite this, the governors – appointed by the Crown – remained largely dependent on the Bermudian parliament to pass laws and to provide funds. This fact often found governors pleading in vain for the required acts of parliament or money to carry out policies determined at Government House, or in London. This was particularly noticeable in the Bermudian parliament's neglect to maintain militia, which (other than during the course of the American War of 1812), it allowed to become moribund after the build-up of the naval and military base began in 1795.

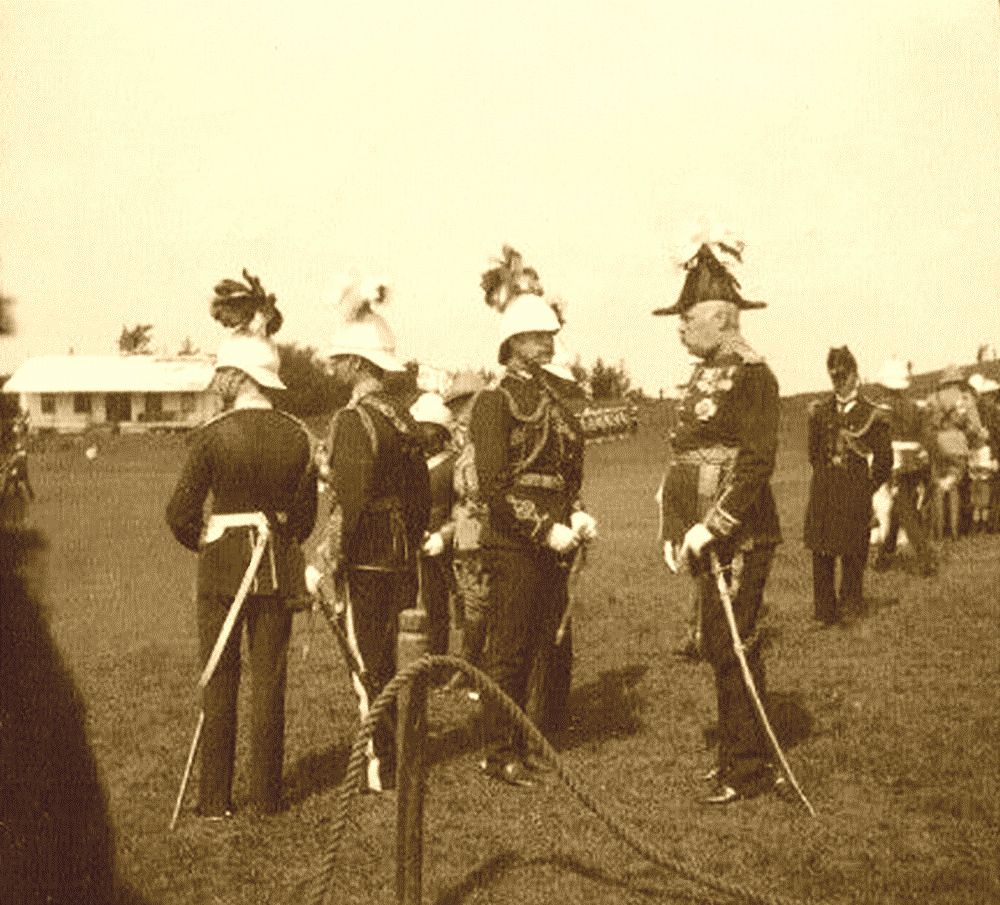
Governor Lt. Gen. Sir Henry Geary, KCB (right), at Prospect Camp, Bermuda, on Tuesday, 11 March 1902, to decorate three officers with the DSO

Attempts to raise militias directly under the control of the governor, without acts of the local parliament, ultimately failed because the parliament did not provide funds. In the 1860s, it became the policy of the British government to reduce the costly professional military garrison in Bermuda. As it was not wished to leave the archipelago, seen more as a naval base and designated an Imperial fortress rather than a colony, unguarded, this could only be done if the professional soldiers were replaced with part-time Volunteer units. Successive governors were set the task of convincing the Bermudian parliament to raise the required units, but, concerned of being saddled with the cost of maintaining the entire garrison, as well as with the possibility for social disruption that could be caused by raising either racially segregated or integrated units, the Bermudian Parliamentarians simply refused. This state of affairs continued until the Secretary of State for War found a lever (the Princess Hotel) to blackmail the Bermuda Parliament with in 1885, which resulted it finally passing acts in 1892 for the creation of militia and volunteer forces (although the units would be entirely funded by the British government). Struggles between the governor and the Parliament would continue to recur. In 1939, the governor, General Sir Reginald Hildyard, resigned his post, reportedly because the Bermudian Parliament refused to allow him a motor car (motor vehicles having been banned in Bermuda before the First World War, following a petition signed by numerous Bermudians, and by visitors including Woodrow Wilson).

On 10 March 1973, the 121st governor, Sir Richard Sharples, and his aide-de-camp Captain Hugh Sayers, were assassinated in an attack by a Bermudian black activist named Buck Burrows and an accomplice, Larry Tacklin, who were members of the Black Beret Cadres. Under Bermudian law at the time, premeditated murder was a capital offence, and death sentences were often handed out, though routinely commuted. No death sentence had been carried out since the 1940s. After much debate due to the controversial moral issues raised, the sentence stood despite a 6,000-strong petition from Bermudians to the queen. Both men were hanged in 1977 for the killings and other murders, sparking riots throughout Bermuda. Buck Burrows explained in his confession that he had killed the governor to prove that he was not untouchable and that white-dominated politics was fallible. He was also found guilty of murdering the police commissioner, George Duckett, six months earlier on 9 September 1972, and of killing the co-owner and book-keeper of a supermarket called the Shopping Centre, Victor Rego and Mark Doe in April 1973.

== List of governors of Bermuda ==
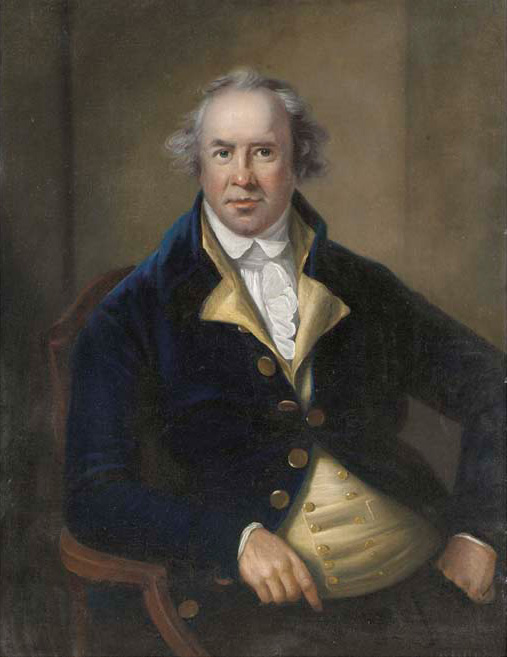
George James Bruere, in office from 1764 to 1780, the longest-serving of all Bermuda's governors

1. 1612–1616 Richard Moore (Deputy Governor in Bermuda. Sir Thomas Smith remained in England as Governor and Treasurer of Bermuda)
2. Between Moore's 1615 departure for England aboard the Welcome and the 1616 arrival of Captain Tucker, the role of acting Deputy Governor was to be rotated monthly among the members of the Counsell of Six: Captain Miles Kendall, Captain John Mansfield, Thomas Knight, Charles Caldicot, Edward Waters, and Christopher Carter, beginning (after the drawing of lots) with Caldicot. At the end of the first month, Caldicot, Knight and Waters departed aboard a frigate to obtain supplies from the West Indies but met with misadventure, and those members of the crew who returned did not do so for years). The monthly succession thereafter was Mansfield, Carter, and Kendall, before starting again with Mansfield
3. 1616–1619: Capt. Daniel Tucker (Deputy Governor in Bermuda. Sir Thomas Smith remained in England as Governor and Treasurer of Bermuda)
4. 1619–1622: Nathaniel Butler
5. 1622–1622: Capt. John Bernard
6. 1622–1623: Capt. John Harrison
7. 1623–1626: Capt. Henry Woodhouse
8. 1626–1629: Capt. Philip Bell
9. 1629–1637: Capt. Roger Wood
10. 1637–1641: Capt. Thomas Chaddock
11. 1641–1642: Capt. William Sayle
12. 1642–1643: Capt. Josias Forster
13. 1643–1644: Capt. William Sayle
14. 1644–1645: The Triumvirate: Capt. William Sayle, Stephen Paynter, William Wilkinson
15. 1645: Capt. Josias Forster
16. 1645: The Triumvirate: Capt. William Sayle, Stephen Paynter, William Wilkinson
17. 1646–1649: Capt. Thomas Turner
18. 1649–1650: John Trimingham (Elected by the People)
19. 1650: J. Jennings
20. 1650–1659: Capt. Josias Forster
21. 1659–1663: Capt. William Sayle
22. 1663–1668: Capt. Florentius Seymour
23. 1668–1669: Samuel Whalley
24. 1669–1681: Sir John Heydon
25. 1681–1682: Capt. Florentius Seymour
26. 1682–1683: Henry Durham (Act. Gov.)
27. 1683–1687: Col. Richard Coney (last Company appointee. Re-appointed by Crown in 1684)
28. 1687–1690: Sir Richard Robinson
29. 1691–1693: Isaac Richier
30. 1693–1698: Capt. John Goddard
31. 1698–1700: Samuel Day
32. 1701–1713: Capt. Benjamin Bennett
33. 1713–1718: Henry Pulleine
34. 1718–1722: Capt. Benjamin Bennett
35. 1722–1727: Sir John Hope
36. 1727–1728: John Trimingham
37. 1728–1737: Capt. John Pitt
38. 1737–1738: Andrew Auchinleck
39. 1738–1744: Alured Popple
40. 1744–1747: Francis Jones
41. 1747–1751: William Popple
42. 1751–1755: Francis Jones
43. 1755–1763: William Popple
44. 1763–1764: Francis Jones
45. 1764–1780: George James Bruere
46. 1780: Thomas Jones
47. 1780–1781: George Bruere the younger
48. 1782–1788: William Browne
49. 1788–1794: Henry Hamilton (Lt. Gov.)
50. 1794–1796: James Crawford
51. 1796: Henry Tucker
52. 1796: Lieutenant-Colonel William Campbell (arrived 22 November 1796, but died within days)
53. 1796–1798: Henry Tucker
54. 1798–1803: Colonel (later General) George Beckwith
55. 1803–1805: Henry Tucker
56. 1805–1806: Major Francis Gore (Lt. Gov.)
57. 1806: Henry Tucker
58. 1806–1810: Brigadier John Studholme Hodgson
59. 1810–1811: Samuel Trott
60. 1811–1812: Sir James Cockburn
61. 1812 William Smith
62. 1812–1816: Brigadier-General (promoted Major-General, 4 June 1813) George Horsford (Lt. Gov.)
63. 1814–1816: Sir James Cockburn
64. 1816–1817: William Smith
65. 1817–1819: Sir James Cockburn
66. 1819: William Smith
67. 1819–1822: Lieutenant-General Sir William Lumley, 22nd Dragoons
68. 1822–1823: William Smith
69. 1823–1825: Lieutenant-General Sir William Lumley, 22nd Dragoons
70. 1825–1826: William Smith
71. 1826–1829: Lieutenant-General Sir Tomkyns Hilgrove Turner, Third Regiment of Foot Guards and colonel of the 19th (or The 1st Yorkshire North Riding) Regiment of Foot
72. 1829: Robert Kennedy (Act. Gov.)
73. 1829–1830: Lieutenant-General Sir Tomkyns Hilgrove Turner
74. 1830 Robert Kennedy (Act. Gov.)
75. 1830–1832: General Sir Tomkyns Hilgrove Turner
76. 1832–1835: Colonel Sir Stephen Remnant Chapman, Royal Engineers
77. 1835: Henry G. Hunt (Act. Gov.)
78. 1835–1836: Robert Kennedy
79. 1836–1839: Colonel (from 1837, Major-General) Sir Stephen Remnant Chapman, Royal Engineers
80. 1839–1846: Lieutenant-Colonel (later Major General) Sir William Reid, Royal Engineers
81. 1846: Lieutenant-Colonel William N. Hutchinson (Act. Gov)
82. 1846–1852: Captain (later Admiral) Sir Charles Elliot, Royal Navy
83. 1852–1853: Lieutenant-Colonel William Hassell Eden, 56th Regiment of Foot (ex-88th Regiment of Foot, later commandant at Chatham) (Act. Gov.)
84. 1853: Lieutenant-Colonel George Philpots, Royal Engineers (Act. Gov.)
85. 1853: Major Soulden Oakley, 56th Regiment of Foot (Act. Gov.)
86. 1853: Lieutenant-Colonel Thomas C. Robe, Royal Artillery (Act. Gov.)
87. 1853: Major Soulden Oakley, 56th Regiment of Foot (Act. Gov.)
88. 1853–1854: Captain (later Admiral) Sir Charles Elliot, Royal Navy
89. 1854: Lieutenant-Colonel Montgomery Williams, Royal Engineers (Act. Gov.)
90. 1854–1859: Colonel Freeman Murray, late 72nd Regiment of Foot
91. 1859: Colonel Andrew T. Hemphill, 26th (Cameronian) Regiment of Foot (Act. Gov.)
92. 1859–1860: Colonel William Munro, 39th Regiment of Foot
93. 1860–1861: Colonel Freeman Murray, late 72nd Regiment of Foot
94. 1861–1864: Colonel Harry St. George Ord, Royal Engineers
95. 1864: Colonel William Munro, 39th Regiment of Foot (Act. Gov.)
96. 1864–1865: Lieutenant-Colonel William George Hamley, Royal Engineers (Lt. Gov.)
97. 1865–1866: Colonel Harry St. George Ord, Royal Engineers (the last Governor to also hold the appointment of Vice-Admiral of Bermuda)
98. 1866–1867: Lieutenant-Colonel William George Hamley, Royal Engineers (Lt. Gov.)
99. 1867: Colonel Arnold Thompson, Royal Artillery (Act. Gov.)
100. 1867–1870: Colonel Sir Frederick Edward Chapman, Royal Engineers
101. 1870: Colonel William Freeland Brett, 61st (South Gloucestershire) Regiment of Foot (Lt. Gov.)
102. 1871–1877: Maj. Gen. Sir John Henry Lefroy, Royal Artillery
103. 1877: Colonel William Laurie Morrison, Commanding Royal Engineer in Bermuda (Act. Gov.)
104. 1877–1882: Brigadier Sir Robert Michael Laffan, Royal Engineers (Gazetted Major-General 2 October 1877, antedated to 8 February 1870. Later Lieutenant-General)
105. 1882–1888: Lt. Gen. Sir Thomas Lionel John Gallwey, Royal Engineers
106. 1888–1891: Lt. Gen. Sir Edward Newdegate, Rifle Brigade
107. 1892–1896: Lt. Gen. Thomas Lyons, 16th (Bedfordshire) Regiment of Foot
108. 1896–1901: Lt. Gen. Sir George Digby Barker, 78th (Highlanders) Regiment of Foot (or The Ross-shire Buffs)
109. 1898-1898: Bermuda Garrison Deputy Assistant Adjutant General Lt. Col. William Andrew Yule, Royal Scots Fusiliers (acting during absence of Lt. Gen. Sir George Digby Barker)
110. 1902–1904: Lt. Gen. Sir Henry Geary, Royal Artillery
111. 1904–1907: Lt. Gen. Sir Robert MacGregor Stewart, Royal Artillery
112. 1905: Colonel Arthur Roberts, Commanding Army Service Corps (temporarily from 10 July 1905, for period of leave of absence of Sir Robert MacGregor Stewart)
113. 1907–1908: Lt. Gen. Sir Josceline Wodehouse, Royal Artillery
114. 1908–1912: Lt. Gen. Sir Frederick Walter Kitchener, West Yorkshire Regiment
115. 1912–1917: Lt. Gen. Sir George Bullock, Devonshire Regiment
116. 1914: Lt.-Col. George Bunbury McAndrew, 2nd Battalion, Lincolnshire Regiment (Act. Gov.)
117. 1917–1922: Gen. Sir James Willcocks, 100th (Prince of Wales's Royal Canadian) Regiment of Foot
118. 1919: Lieutenant-Colonel HB DesVouex Royal Engineers (acting; Commanding Royal Engineer Bermuda)
119. 1922–1927: Lt. Gen. Sir Joseph John Asser, Dorsetshire Regiment
120. 1927–1931: Lt. Gen. Sir Louis Bols, Devonshire Regiment
121. 1931–1936: Lt. Gen. Sir Thomas Cubitt, Royal Artillery
122. 1936–1939: General Sir Reginald Hildyard, Queen's Own (Royal West Kent Regiment)
123. 1939–1941: Lt. Gen. Sir Denis Bernard, Rifle Brigade
124. 1941–1943: Edward Knollys, 2nd Viscount Knollys
125. 1943: E. Roderic Williams (acting)
126. 1943–1945: Honorary Colonel David Cecil, Baron Burghley, Northamptonshire Regiment (Territorial Army) (substantive Major, Reserve of Officers)
127. 1945 – May 1946: William Addis (acting)
128. May 1946 – 1949: Admiral Sir Ralph Leatham, Royal Navy
129. 1949: Colonial Secretary William Addis (Act. Gov.)
130. 1949–1955: Lt. Gen. Sir Alexander Hood, Royal Army Medical Corps
131. 1955–1959: Lt. Gen. Sir John Woodall, Royal Artillery
132. 1959–1964: Maj. Gen. Sir Julian Gascoigne, Grenadier Guards
133. 1964–1972: Roland Robinson, 1st Baron Martonmere
134. 1972–1973: Sir Richard Sharples (assassinated)
135. 1973: IAC Kinnear (acting)
136. 1973 – 7 April 1977: Sir Edwin Leather
137. 7 April – 6 September 1977: Peter Lloyd (acting – 1st tenure)
138. 1977 – 30 December 1980: Sir Peter Ramsbotham
139. 1 January – February 1981: Peter Lloyd (acting – 2nd tenure)
140. February 1981 – 15 March 1983: Sir Richard Posnett
141. 14 February – July 1983: Mark Herdman (acting) – Acting for Governor Posnett until 15 March 1983
142. 1983–1988: John Morrison, 2nd Viscount Dunrossil
143. 1988–1992: Major-Gen Sir Desmond Langley, Life Guards
144. 25 August 1992 – 4 June 1997: David Waddington, Baron Waddington
145. 4 June 1997 – 27 November 2001: Thorold Masefield
146. 27 November 2001 – 11 April 2002: Tim Gurney (acting)
147. 11 April 2002 – 12 October 2007: Sir John Vereker
148. 12 October – 12 December 2007: Mark Capes (acting)
149. 12 December 2007 – 18 May 2012: Sir Richard Gozney
150. 18–23 May 2012: David Arkley (acting)
151. 23 May 2012 – 2 August 2016: George Fergusson
152. 2 August – 5 December 2016: Ginny Ferson (acting)
153. 5 December 2016 – 12 December 2020: John Rankin
154. 12 December 2020 – 14 December 2020: Alison Crocket (acting)
155. 14 December 2020 – 14 January 2025: Rena Lalgie
156. 14 January 2025 – 23 January 2025: Tom Oppenheim (acting)
157. 23 January 2025 – present: Andrew Murdoch

== See also ==
- Colonial Secretary of Bermuda

== Sources ==
- Government of Bermuda- list of Governors
- BBC News- "British officials shot dead in Bermuda"
