= Henry Tucker of The Grove =

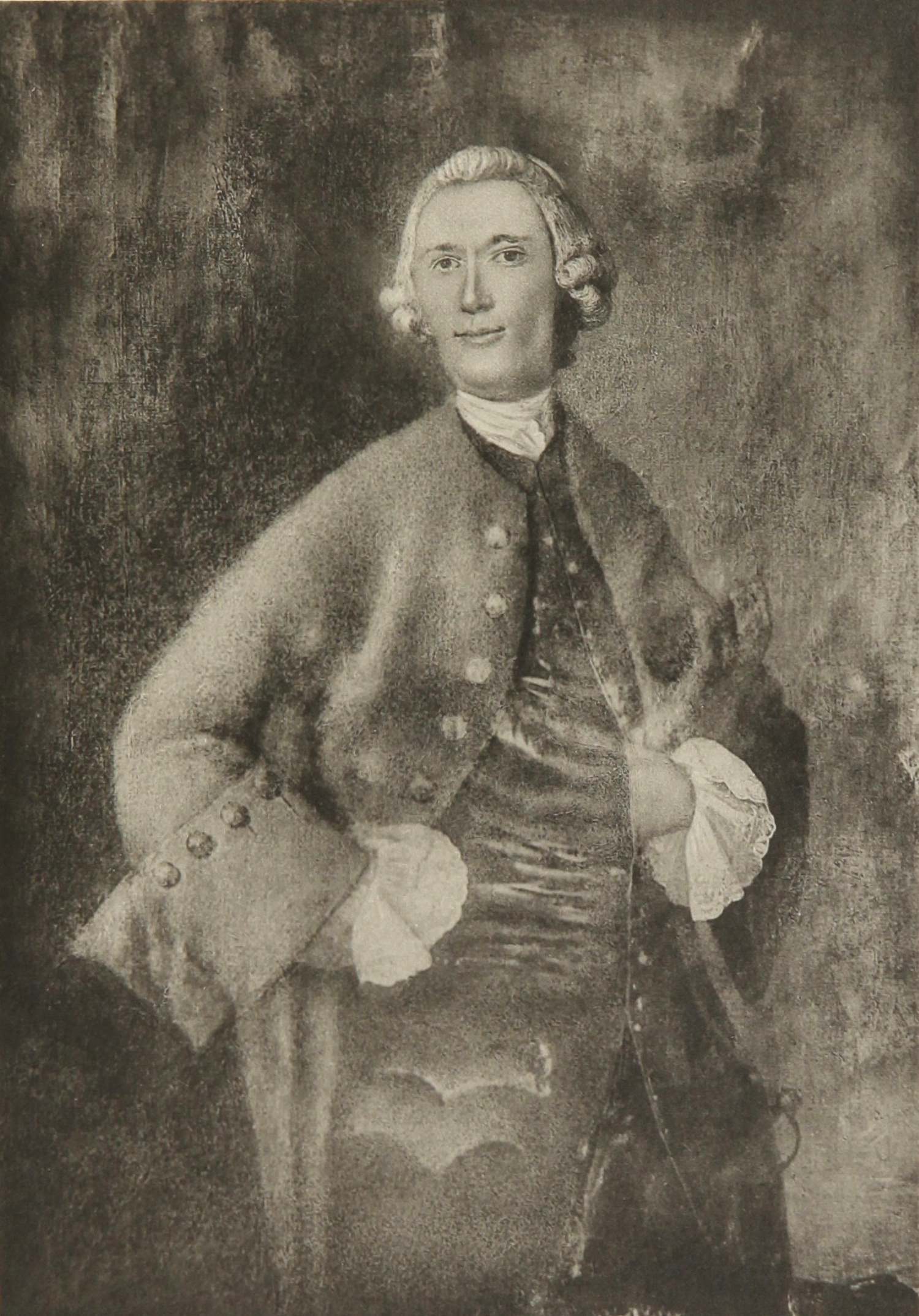
Col. Henry Tucker, by Joseph Blackburn c. 1753

Colonel Henry Tucker (1713–1787), generally known as Henry Tucker of The Grove (in reference to his estate in Southampton Parish), was a prominent Bermudian merchant, politician and Militia officer, and was the co-conspirator with Benjamin Franklin of the 14 August 1775, theft of a hundred barrels of gunpowder from a magazine in St. George's for supply to the rebel army during the American War of Independence.

== Early years ==
The Tucker family had been prominent in Bermuda since the 1616 appointment of Captain Daniel Tucker as Governor of the English colony. Before the war, he had been a Member of the Governing Council of Bermuda and an officer of the Militia, among other appointments. Colonel Tucker and other members of Bermuda's merchant elite that dominated all level of politics were primarily concerned during the American War of Independence not so much with supporting the rebellion as protecting Bermuda from economic disaster and possible starvation despite the embargo against its primary trading partners, the rebellious colonies. Following the end of hostilities, this clique remained in control of Bermuda, and suffered no reprisal for their treasonous activities. It was at this point that Tucker was promoted to Colonel, in command of all of Bermuda's Militia companies.

Colonel Henry Tucker was the father of Henry Tucker (1742–1800), the President of the Council of Bermuda during and after the war. Two of his other sons, St. George Tucker (1752–1827), and Thomas Tudor Tucker (1745–1828), had served in rebel militias and civil government during and after the war.

== See also ==
- History of Bermuda

== Sources ==
- Kaye, John William (1854). Life And Correspondence Of Henry St George Tucker. Richard bentley, London.
