= Architecture of Bermuda =

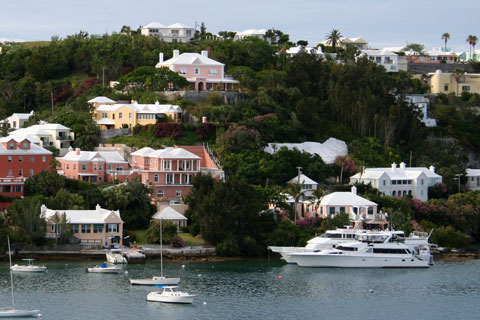
White-roofed, colourful houses dot Bermuda's hills.

The architecture of Bermuda has developed over the past four centuries. The archipelago's isolation, environment, climate, and scarce resources have been key driving points, though inspiration from Europe, the Caribbean and the Americas is evident. Distinctive elements appeared with initial settlement in the early 17th century, and by the second half of that century features that remain common today began to appear.

Pastel Bermuda cottages are often regarded as a hallmark of the island, along with pink beaches and Bermuda shorts; the style has even been described as the country's only indigenous art form. In addition to the local style, historical military buildings and forts and modern office buildings are highly visible. The historical architecture of Bermuda has received recognition from UNESCO, with the Town of St. George and some twenty-two forts and military facilities in St. George's Parish being declared World Heritage Sites.

== Bermuda style ==
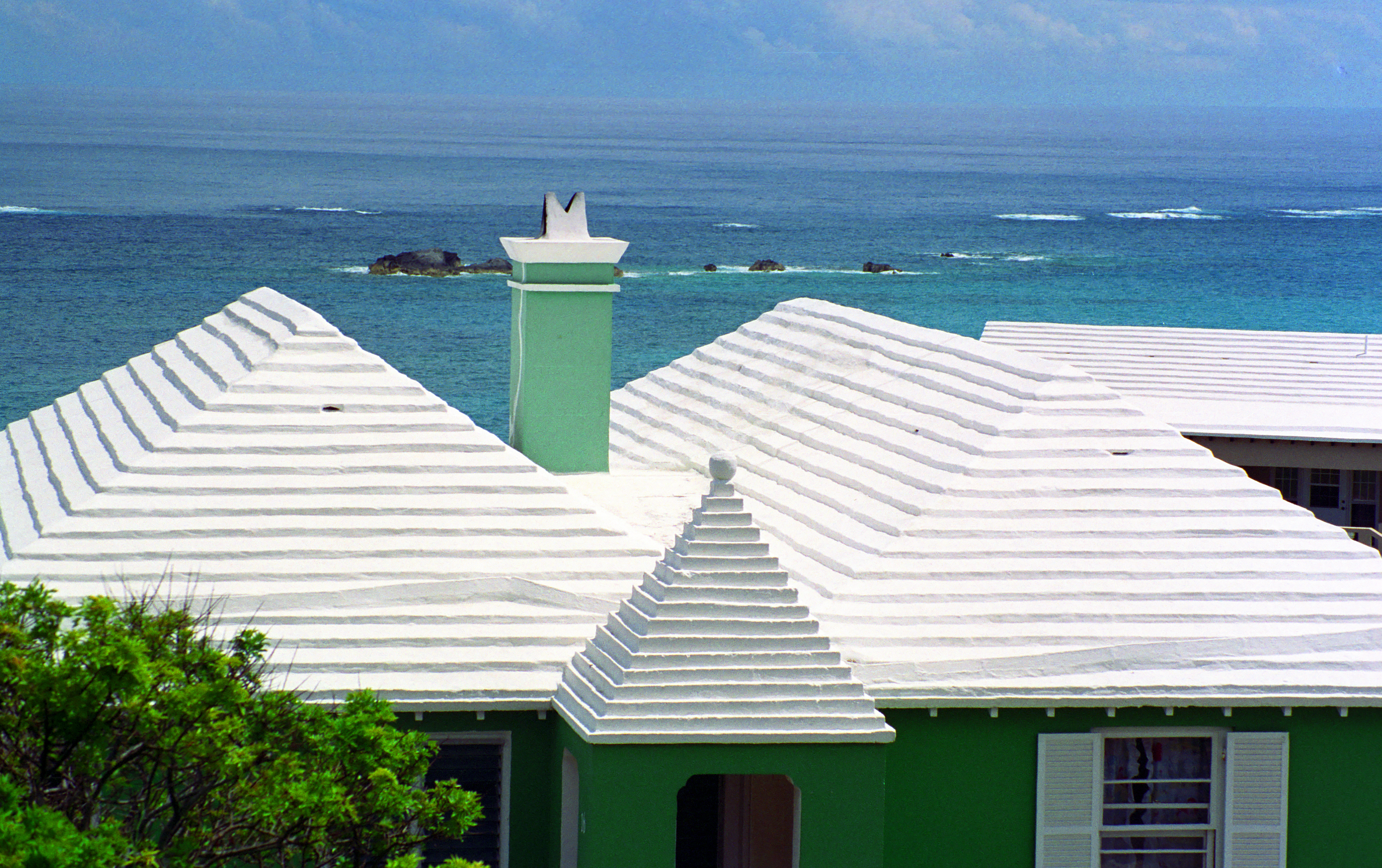
A typical residence, emphasis on the stepped Bermudian roof, used for rainwater collection

The archetypical Bermuda house is a low, squared building with a stepped, white roof and pastel-painted walls, both of which are made out of stone. Between roof and wall are a series of eaves painted a third colour, which is also used on the wooden shutters of relatively small windows. Often built on a slope, there is a set of stairs, wider at the base than at the top, leading up to a porch or veranda around the front door. Rare embellishments include a brick pattern down the corners of the building, and narrow moulding to highlight features such as windows.

The roofs are designed to catch water, of which there is no fresh supply in Bermuda apart from rain. The walls are designed to restrict damage from hurricanes and are required by law to be able to withstand wind speeds of over 100 mph (160 km/h).

Houses are often given names.

== History and development ==
=== Initial development (1600–1700) ===
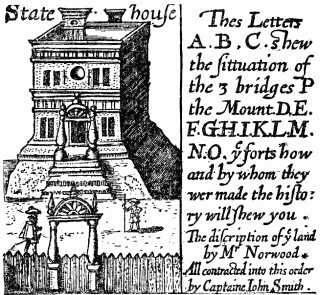
The State House, Bermuda, built in 1620, was one of the first stone structures.

The predominance of stone as a building material came about early in Bermuda's history. The first settlers built using the native and abundant Bermuda cedar, but such structures were rarely able to withstand either the normal winds or the occasional hurricane. Furthermore, the Somers Isles Company intended to exploit the value of cedar wood, particularly for shipbuilding, and soon passed laws that forbade the felling and use of that wood without express permission. The only material left for settlers to use was Bermuda's limestone foundation (often called "coral" for its origin), with the stone being cut into square bricks – typically about 2 feet (610 mm) by 10 inches (250 mm).

This method of using large stone blocks proved expensive, with one 1890 estimate being that a Bermuda house cost three times more than it should. The main cause of this expense was high labour costs, though the rarity of building-quality limestone also contributed. However, this did not prove expensive enough to price the poor out of the market, thus restricting the growth of shanty towns.

The archetypical house of the late 17th century had several distinguishing features. The building was usually quite simple in design, with a similar plan to a contemporary English farmhouse. Though usually only one storey tall, most were built facing out from slopes (possibly to preserve the comparatively fertile valleys for agriculture, a dominant industry until the 20th century), thus necessitating a set of steps to the front entrance. These staircases were styled to curve out, so ending up far wider at the base than at the top. This flared style, known locally today as "Welcoming Arm" stairs, remains common. Less common variants used parallel arms, and in the narrow streets of the Town of St. George staircases were often flush with the wall. At the top of the stairs would be a porch-like vestibule, larger than was common elsewhere, where visitors and passersby could rest in the shade. These porch areas were continuously expanded with furniture and muslin mosquito nets. Wooden window shutters became common, particularly "jalousies" — which were hinged at the top — that were probably imported from the West Indies. Food was often stored in a buttery separate from the main house, which was designed to keep food cool. This was achieved by keeping the actual storage room raised above the ground, typically five or six steps worth of height, and using a pointed roof, enabling convective heat transfer to keep warm air from the food. Kitchens were also distinctive, occasionally placed in out-buildings or in basements and noted for the use of wide, raised chimneys possibly inspired by the open hearth.

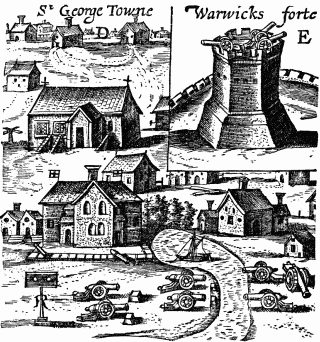
St. George's, Bermuda, the initial settlement, as it appeared in 1624.

The earliest roofing was made of palmetto thatch but, partially from encouragement from the colonial government, stone shingles slowly came to be preferred. By 1687, only 29 of the 579 houses in Bermuda had been upgraded to stone and only 63 were shingled.

The buildings were originally quite plain, due to the brittleness of limestone and lingering Puritanical asceticism. Only two means of decor have been observed in 17th century buildings: "Eyebrow Windows" and gable-ends. The former may have been inspired by the Gothic architecture of churches. By the start of the 18th century, the latter, inspired by contemporary Stuart architecture and demonstrating resistance to hurricane damage when buttressed by a chimney, had splintered into three distinct styles: stepped, bowed and scalloped, with evident similarities to Spanish and Portuguese colonial architecture.

Owing to the lack of water sources on the island, roofs were and are still used for rainwater collection. Early water tanks were placed not underground, but in adjacent stone structures later likened by one American observer to a lean-to. These tanks were fed via a stone gutter from the roof. Sunk six to eight feet down, they were typically rectangular and appeared barrel-vaulted above the surface. A distinctive style of Bermudian roof developed, with a stepped profile of limestone slabs, grouted to make it impermeable and to stay clean. Rain on such a roof is slowed by the steps, rather than sloping tiles, and is collected by the gutter. This dependence on harvester rain led to a culture of water conservation, even with today's desalination plants.

Interior wooden elements such as the ceiling and floors would be made of wood, often pine or hemlock from the continent.

=== Middle period (1700–1900) ===
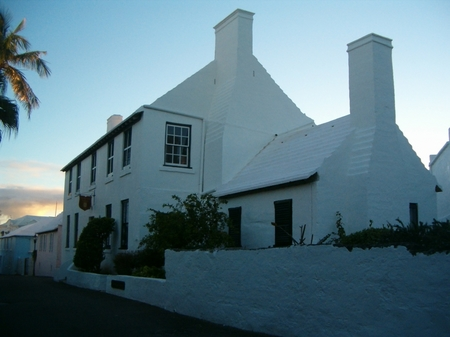
Stewart Hall in St. George's was built around 1707.

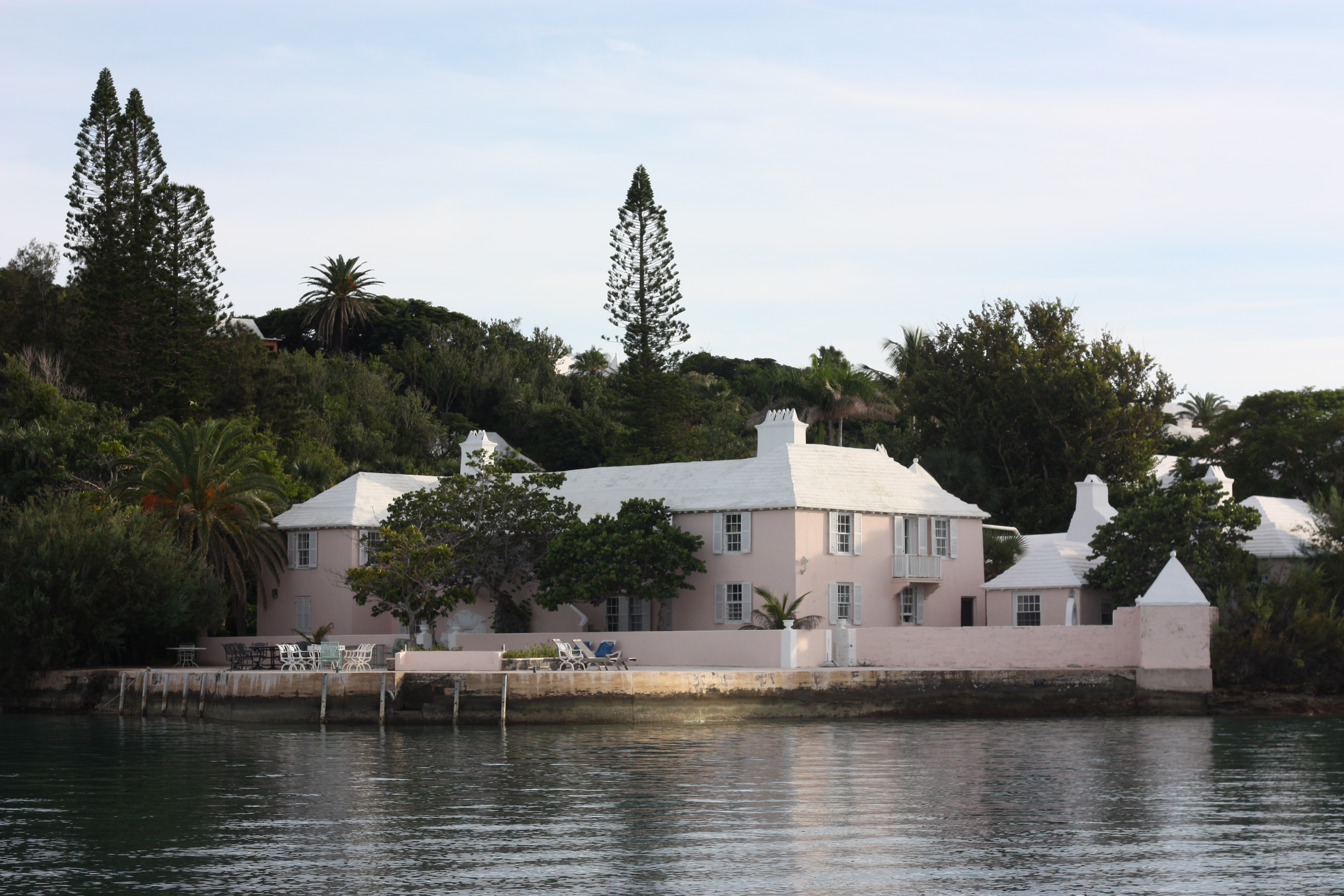
"Spithead", the 18th Century Bermudian home of Hezekiah Frith and 20th Century home of Eugene O'Neill and Oona O'Neill.

Into the 18th century, the settlement in Bermuda, and thus the architecture of Bermuda, had been developing for a century. In 1712 and 1714, two particularly bad hurricane strikes showcased the need for the resilient local structures in lieu of European designs, thus ensuring that local architecture would continue to progress.

Georgian architecture, at least in the British sense, did not catch on in Bermuda, though the contemporary local style did resemble the "colonial Georgian" of North America. During the 18th century embellishing buildings with decoration and adopting elements from Chinese and Neo-Classical architecture became common. Finials, a chinoiserie fad in both Europe and North America, appeared on gable-ends and buttery pinnacles. While the original, ten-to-fifty inch Chinese finials were elaborate designs of porcelain glazed yellow, green, red, blue, orange and buff, those in Bermuda, made of brittle local limestone, remained stone-coloured and rarely exceeded fifteen inches (380 mm). Another Chinese architectural import was the now-iconic Moongate. Again, the Bermudian version was made of limestone and, unlike the Asian originals, not sunken into walls.

Stone pillars came into vogue, adorning driveway entrances. Square, instead of the cylindrical of their Neo-Classical inspiration, these pillars were crowned with capitals of heterodox stone slabs stacked on top of each other to give a geometric pattern. While eaves in the West Indies tended to be made large enough to provide shade, those in Bermuda were kept shallow — less than a foot — to reduce damage from hurricane wind, which could push against larger eaves and lift the roof off. Jack-rafters, also known as rafter-feet, were toyed with as decoration. They were left exposed, similar to corbels, and painted a colour that contrasted with the roof and walls.

Internally, well-steeped tray ceilings replaced the open-beamed Tudor style. Above this, the roofs changed considerably. The hip roof, shallower than its predecessors, was adopted, and roofing slates of thin, handcut limestone slabs replaced shingles. These slates were slightly over an inch thick, and ten to twelve inches (300 mm) long; laid over a cedar frame in an overlapping pattern, they gave a down-stepped appearance. Finally, the roofs were coated with a mixture of lime, sand and water and, when available, turtle and whale oil to provide extra weather-proofing. Apart from the animal oil, this method of roof construction continues to be used. The walls, likewise, were often whitewashed, giving the island a faux snowcover if seen from a distance, though American author Mark Twain preferred to liken it to cake icing, "the white of marble...modest and retiring [in comparison]". French botanist André Michaux, on the other hand, found the reflective glare of the roofs fatiguing. A common alternative to the whitewash was a simple lime plaster made — much like the wash — of lime, red clay and turtle or whale oil. If well-maintained, this plaster kept walls free of moisture, but if cracked, moisture would be retained.

As the water available for domestic use was obtained via the roof, the only way to expand the amount available was to expand the house laterally. Rooms were added to the existing block, first giving buildings a cruciform appearance and later leaving no standard floor plan for the archetypical house. By 1711, propertied Bermudians often lived in houses of three to six rooms, the central of which was called the "hall"; this "hall" served as the principle sitting and formal dining room. Porches were often closed in with stone walls and window rather than being open-air. Common rooms included the "parlour", a bedroom, two or three "bedchambers", an "entry" distinct from the porch and a peripheral "outlet" room often at the back of the house.

Archways came to be featured heavily in doorways. Porches, backdoors and even basements featured simple arches, rarely decorated with capitals or voussoir-style keystones, that show inspiration from both Colonial Mexico and Saxon-Roman styles. These arches continued outward, appearing as garden gateways.

The 18th century saw the use of the casement window adjoined to the wall plate between the wall and rafters. In time, the casement would be replaced by the sash window, and improved building techniques allowed window- and door-frames to be removed from the wallplate.

Neo-classical styles, then in vogue in both Britain and America, appeared, particularly among the wealthy. Porticos with simple limestone Doric order pillars topped by comparatively elaborate capitals were built, and upstairs windows were made smaller to recreate Classical optical perspective. The corners of buildings were also adorned with mock columns, and gateways were made more ornate. To further accent building geometry, narrow strips of moulding were used to highlight features such as storeys and windows.

Garden walls replaced fences that had been erected to keep out animals. These walls were initially low and augmented by fairly tall stone posts, between which picket fencing was installed. Victorian notions of privacy, however, would see many of these hybrid fences replaced by tall, solid stone walls, particularly in the east. Substantial — often pretentious — gateposts and wooden gates were standard elements. Towards the end of the 18th century, verandahs replaced the built-up porches at the top of the front staircase. First appearing in buildings designed by the British military, the verandahs originated in India and were popular in the West Indies. Initially most used either a plain square baluster or a "Chinese Chippendale" style, increasingly elaborate forms took precedence during the Victorian era.

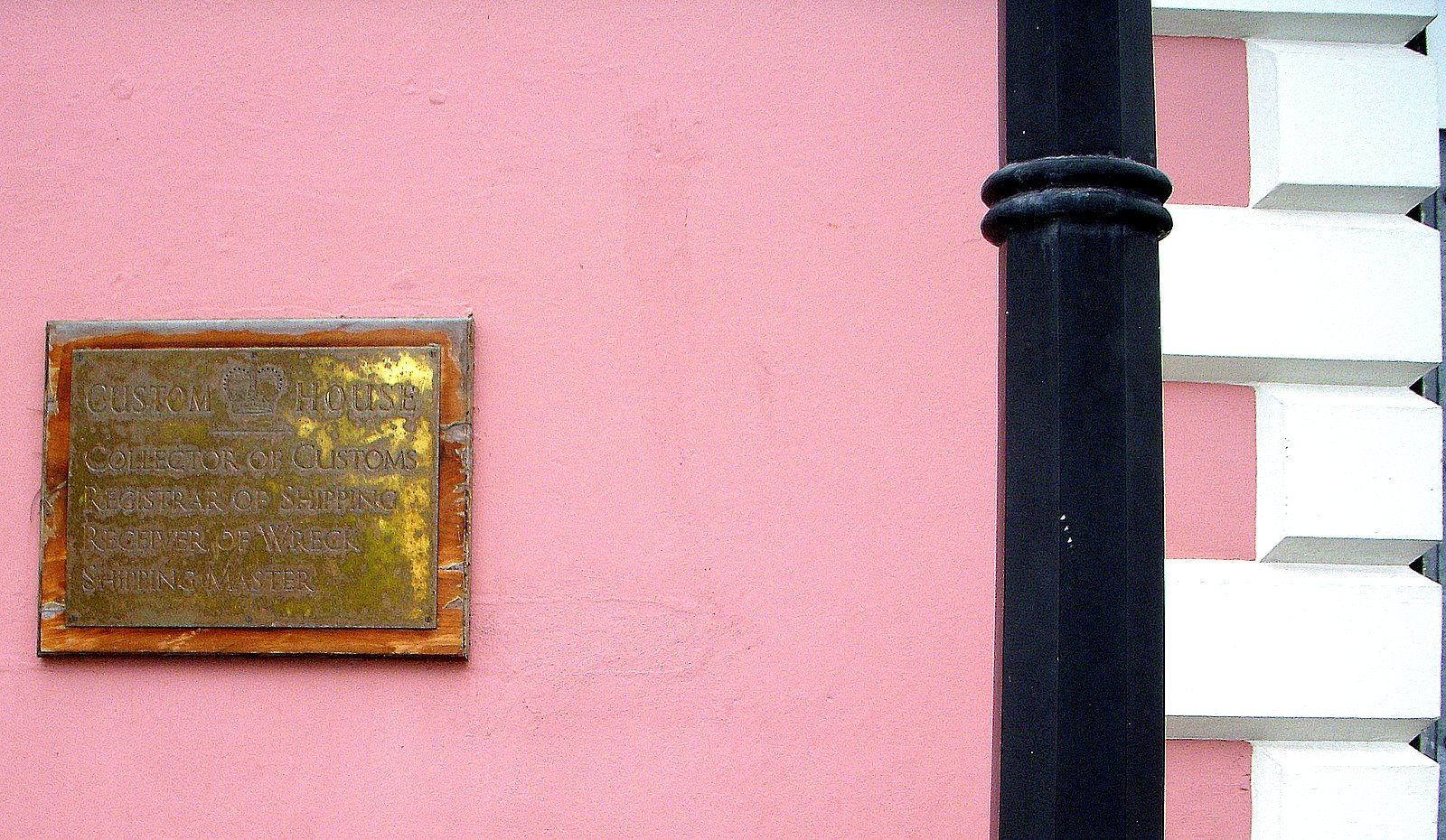
The Bermuda Customs House in Hamilton features white quoins on a pink wall.

During the 19th century, the earlier design features were refined and softened. Gable-ends (now strengthened by concrete and making a fashionable comeback), pillars and gateways were rounded while capitals became standard for porch pillars. The mock columns on the corners of buildings were replaced with quoins, also called "quoinces" and "longs and shorts", that alternated between being Headers or Stretchers. This style seems to have its origins in Anglo-Saxon England.

Porches had been in decline since the second half of the 18th century, and by the early 19th century the inner entryway was also disappearing in favour of a direct entrance to the central hall.

During the 1880s, Bermuda followed Britain in adopting the use of imported, clay-baked tiles for building decoration. Few examples of this, however, have survived. Another British import was the Gothic revival in Bermuda's Anglican community. Seen most prominently in the cathedral in Hamilton, many of the islands' churches were redesigned with more elaborate edifices.

=== Modern developments (1900–present) ===
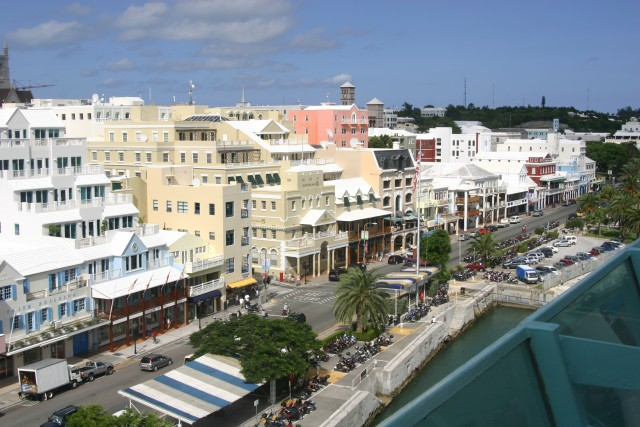
The city of Hamilton has a mixture of both traditional and modern styles.

During the 20th century, expanded contact with the outside world has led to a considerable diversification of Bermuda's architecture, more so with commercial developments than residential, to the detriment of traditional styles. Concern for the loss of Bermudian identity led to the 1937 creation of the Bermuda Historical Monuments Trust, predecessor to the present-day Bermuda National Trust, to purchase and preserve important examples of indigenous architecture. Initially, though, earlier styles made a resurgence, as did the Colonial Spanish arch. The Edwardian period saw the introduction of hybrid British-American bungalows marketed to the middle class; features included exposed eaves, windows gathered together and low roofs that were extended to cover porches.

The early century also saw the perhaps counterintuitive growth of wooden buildings. Often these buildings were to provide cheap housing for imported labour, such as from the West Indies in the 1900s and 1930s, or during the Second World War for the builders of Kindley Air Force Base. Such designs were usually looked down up: the wooden neighbourhood on King's Point was described as a shanty town. Wooden buildings became most prolific in Sandys parish, near to the Royal Naval Dockyard, followed by St. George's near the Kindley Field (used to house not only labourers but displaced residents) and finally Pembroke. In the subsequent decades, many of these wooden buildings would be demolished.

Pre-fabricated buildings, often imported from the United States appeared early. Typically, they have been used as temporary, low-cost residences. Prior to the outbreak of the Second World War, Cox Outerbridge imported wooden pre-fabricated buildings and created an affordable community on his estate in Pembroke. As recently as 2005, the government of Bermuda has imported pre-fabricated buildings in a somewhat controversial attempt to address the country's housing crisis. The need for these alternatives is quite clear: by 2004, the cost of traditional construction was over $175 per square foot, combined with land prices of $1 million per acre. By the beginning of 2007, this left the average cost of a house at over $1.5 million, and approaching $2 million by August of that year. By late 2008, construction costs had reached $250 per square foot.

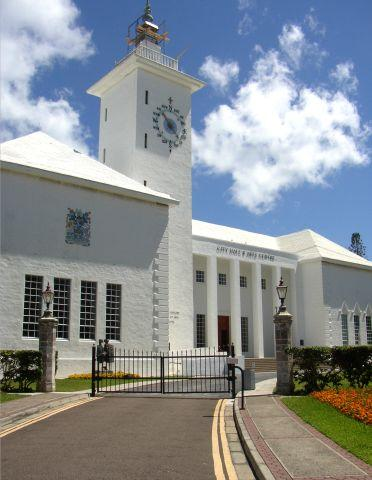
Completed in 1960 the (second) City Hall of Hamilton was inspired by traditional cottage design, though its central tower demonstrates a Scandinavian influence.

In 1933, a large sum of money was bequeathed to the city of Hamilton for the construction of a new city hall. The new structure, begun in the late 1950s and finished in 1960, was designed by Bermudian architect Wil Onions to copy styles from the traditional Bermuda cottage. Onions been demonstrating his skills at marrying modern needs with traditional decor for many years, and his work inspired a revitalised interest in traditional architecture.

Modern civil architecture appeared in Bermuda in the 1960s, though it has been mostly limited to the city of Hamilton and its immediate outskirts. Generally used for private commercial purposes, the overseas styles began to take over the Hamilton skyline as international business grew, restricted only by a government mandate that no building be taller than the city's Cathedral.

In 2000, the Town of St. George and the east-end fortifications were nominated for inclusion on UNESCO's list of World Heritage Sites, under the grounds of architecture that illustrates human history (criterion iv) and direct association with events and traditions (criterion vi). During the selection process, the delegate from Mexico questioned why the site was not part of a serial nomination of Caribbean fortifications (considered by the United Nations to be part of a different region, Latin America, from Bermuda, Northern America, per the United Nations geoscheme) and the delegate from Thailand questioned why ICOMOS wanted to apply criterion vi; it was decided to inscribe the site on the World Heritage List under criterion iv only.

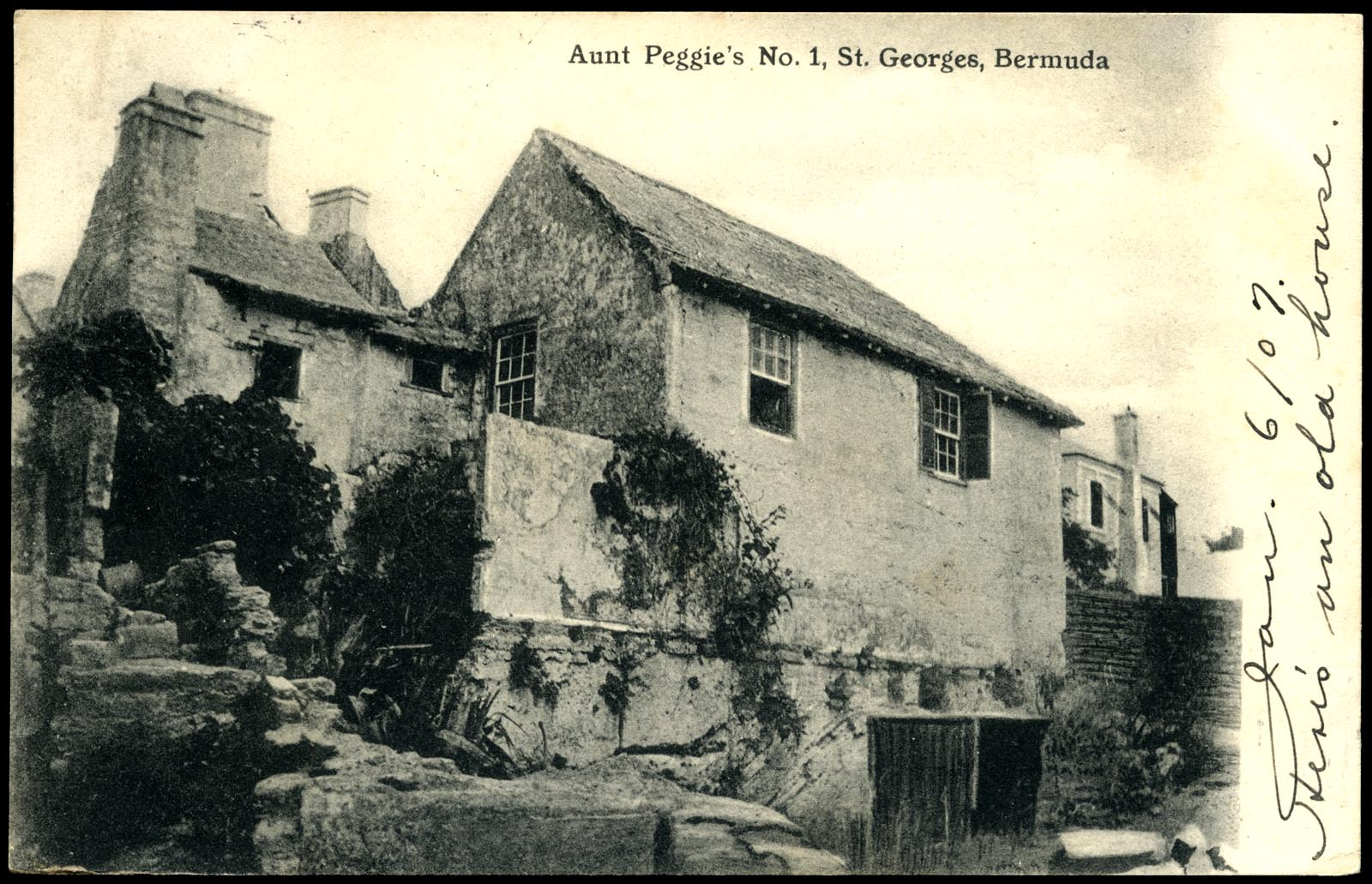
If the label is accurate, "Harbour View" as it appeared in 1907.

In 2004, the renovation of "Harbour View" in St. George's was followed by the American home improvement franchise This Old House. The coverage was featured in four issues of the This Old House magazine and eight episodes of its television series, This Old House. It was only the second time that the program had ventured outside of the United States. The renovation was designed by a local architect, Colin Campbell, and largely performed by local companies.

Most recently, focus on sustainable development has led to experiments in green architecture. In late 2008, the country's first LEED-accredited building was completed in Hamilton, but the adoption of green technologies such as solar panels has been extremely slow.

== Military construction ==
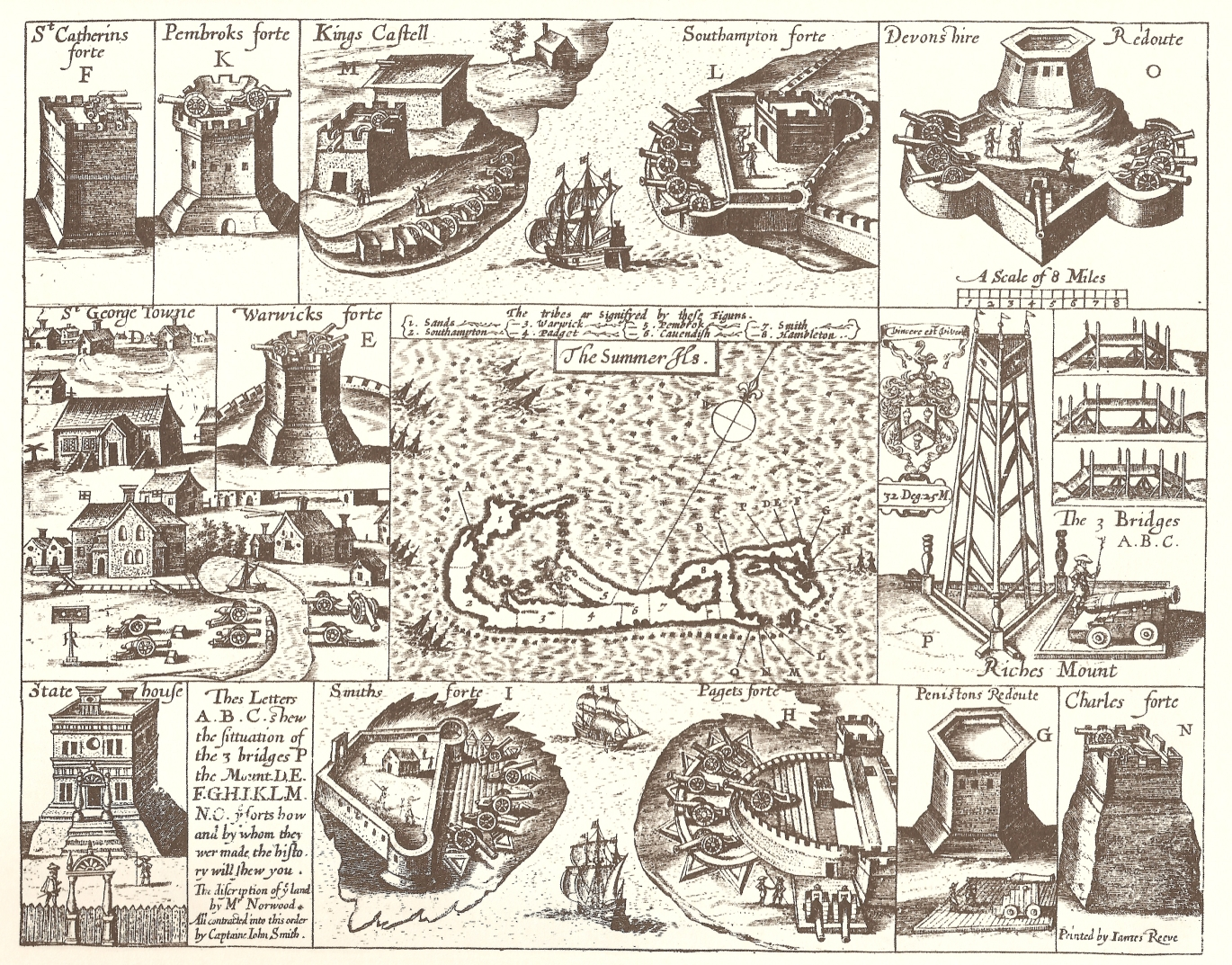
Captain John Smith's 1624 map of Bermuda, showing the extent of fortification only a decade after colonisation.

Local and British needs for military development long drove Bermuda's construction industry. During the age of colonisation, risk of attack by the Spanish, French and Dutch led to a ring of wooden fortifications being built along the coastline. The first forts, Paget Fort and Smith's Fort, were built in 1612 − the first year of colonisation – to protect St. George's Harbour. These first forts were built simply, starting out as platforms cut into stone where cannons were then placed. They were then haphazardly expanded to the point where they could not withstand the elements and collapsed. Fortification was slowly expanded to guard the entrance of Castle Harbour, in time to fend off a Spanish expedition in 1614. King's Castle was raised that same year, but subsequent attempts to improve the fort were unsuccessful; six years later, Southampton Fort and the Devonshire Redoubt were added to Castle Harbour's defence.

By the 18th century few wooden forts — indeed, few of the original structures — remained. The ring alternated between high towers and squat, hexagonal or square forts. The eastern part of the archipelago was particularly well-fortified. King's Castle continued to be expanded, with an underground magazine and an outhouse cut of the stone that strongly resembles a local buttery. A total of twenty forts — nearly one for each of Bermuda's square miles — would be erected by 1800, most of them to guard St. Georges. By 1783, over half of the colony's cannons ringed the eastern parish. These forts did not follow the conventional bastion-style that then prevailed in Europe; instead they most resembled the fortifications built under Henry VIII along the coast of southern England in the early 16th century.

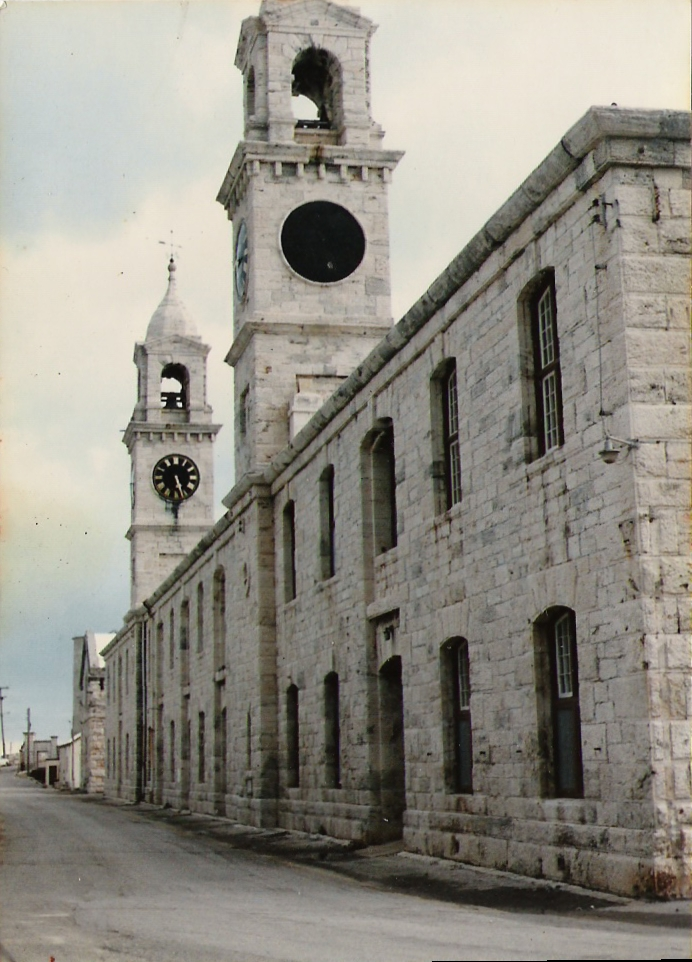
The buildings at the Dockyard had little in common with local structures.

During and following the American War for Independence, the British began to use the island as a major naval outpost. The most notable construction of this period was the Royal Naval Dockyard. The site surveyed in 1796, construction began in 1812 without regard to the local architectural developments. Instead, it was built with conventional methods using brick and slate imported from Great Britain and Canada. Construction of the Dockyard continued until the 1860s and relied heavily on penal labour, using prisoners from Britain housed in floating hulks. Construction resumed at the end of the 19th century and was done by imported West Indian workers. One of the most prominent buildings of the Dockyard was the Commissioner's House, designed by the Royal Navy's chief architect Edward Holl. At 30,000 square feet (2,800 m^{2}), the verandah-wrapped building was far larger and grander than either the Government House, residence of Bermuda's governor, or the Admiralty House used by the head of the North American Station. The Commissioner's House introduced the use of cast iron in buildings and was built largely using prison labour. Internally, the building featured Soane styling, flushing toilets and hot water. By the time the building was finished in 1832, the final cost was nearly £50,000 ($250,000); the Navy Board was outraged, and the building came to be regarded as a white elephant. The building was subsequently used as barracks by the British Army and the Royal Marines until its commissioning by the Royal Navy as HMS Malabar during the First World War.

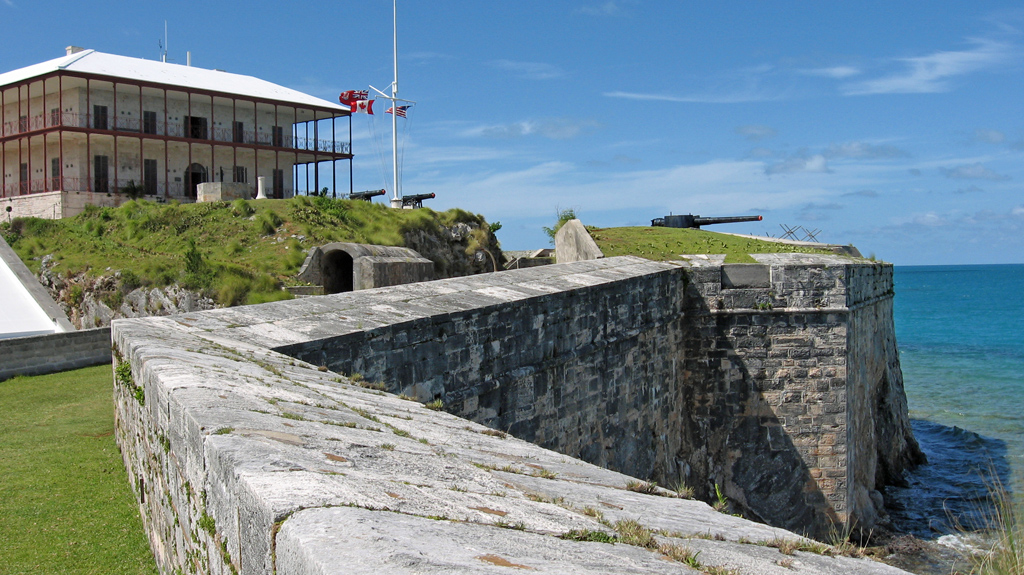
The Commissioner's House and the walls of the Keep at the Dockyard.

Other military construction also followed the traditional British patterns, and had negligible effect on local architecture. Through the 19th century, the British military continued to construct and expand fortifications and lay roads and bridges, most notably the causeway connecting Long Bird Island and St. David's Island to the main island. St. George's was also re-fortified by the Royal Engineers. New or replacement forts included Upper Paget Fort/Fort Cunningham, built above the remains of the first Paget Fort, Fort Victoria and Fort Albert to the east and Fort St. Catherine, on the northern tip of St. George's. St. George's also saw the construction of Fort George and Fort William as well as seaward artillery batteries at Buildings Bay and on St. David's Island. In the 1820s, Bermuda's only Martello tower was built to cover Ferry Reach.

In the aftermath of the American Civil War, concerns over a landward attack on the Royal Naval Dockyard led to large tracts of the central parish of Devonshire being acquired by the British military. Fort Prospect and Fort Langton, both built to an out-dated design, and the Military Hospital were constructed in the area, and local houses were used as officers' residences.

Not all of the British military buildings were fortifications, of course. Barracks, hospitals and officer houses were built to British military standard, which fared poorly in Bermuda. Verandahs were often supported by iron columns that required constant painting, while roofs were lined with Welsh slate that was lost after every hurricane. Though a few pretentious copycats still appeared among Bermuda's residences, around the start of the 20th century even the military was abandoning the style in favour of local techniques.

One of the largest and perhaps most traumatic military developments was the construction of Kindley Air Force Base by the United States. Seizing large areas of the eastern islands, many traditional houses were demolished and replaced by American-style buildings. The new buildings were given some superfluous local traits, such as white roofs and coloured walls, but otherwise inherited nothing from local design. As with the earlier British works, there was no lasting influence of these buildings on local architecture.

== Notable structures ==
=== St. George's (town and parish) ===
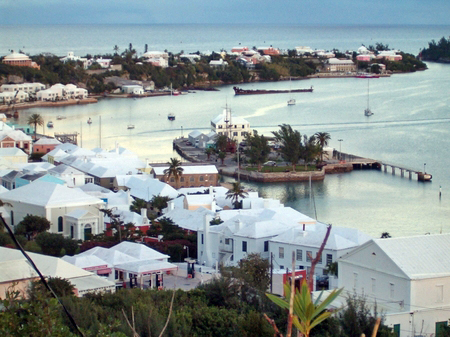
The Town of St. George and its fortifications are a World Heritage Site

- The State House, built in an Italian style, once housed Bermuda's Parliament; since 1797 it has been rented by a Masonic Lodge at the rate of one peppercorn per year, which is collected by the governor in a small ceremony (see: peppercorn (legal)).
- The Old Rectory, built in 1699 by failed privateer and slave trader George Dew, is one of Bermuda's oldest houses.
- The Globe Hotel, built c. 1700 by Governor Samuel Day, is one of Bermuda's oldest stone buildings. Day used public funds to construct the building as his personal home, which he kept after being ousted from office. In 1951 it was purchased by the Bermuda Historical Monuments Trust and converted into a museum about Bermuda's role during the American Civil War.
- St. Peter's Church was the last in a succession of churches at the site; built in 1713 and extensively renovated in the 19th century.
- Fort St. Catherine was built in the 1830s at the northern tip of the archipelago; now part of the World Heritage Site, it houses a museum.
- The Unfinished Church was begun in 1874 as a Gothic Revival replacement for St. Peter's Church; financial difficulties and storm damage led to the project being abandoned and the site left to ruin.
- Arcadia House, a Grade One-listed building built in 1900 and used as officers' housing. It was demolished in 2008.

=== Elsewhere ===
- Verdmont, in Smith's, a mansion built in 1710 now run as a museum by the Bermuda National Trust, which has changed little in the past three centuries.
- The Bermuda headquarters of Bacardi, in Hamilton, follows an International style design by Ludwig Mies van der Rohe, closely resembling his Neue Nationalgalerie, and was declared (presumably humorously) "the most Bermudian of all Bermudian buildings" by its builders.
- The Cathedral of the Most Holy Trinity was completed in 1894 so that Hamilton could be conferred "city status"; it is by law the tallest building in the city.
- The Keep, including the Commissioner's House, is the home of the Bermuda Maritime Museum; other buildings at the Dockyard on Ireland Island remain standing but have been converted for commercial purposes.

== Gallery ==
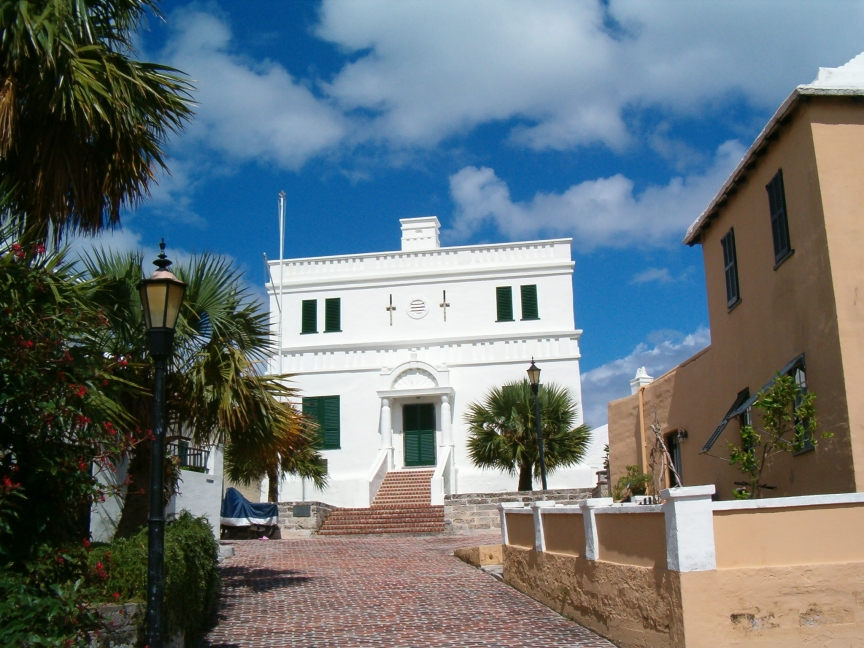
A street in the Town of St. George leading up to the historic State House.

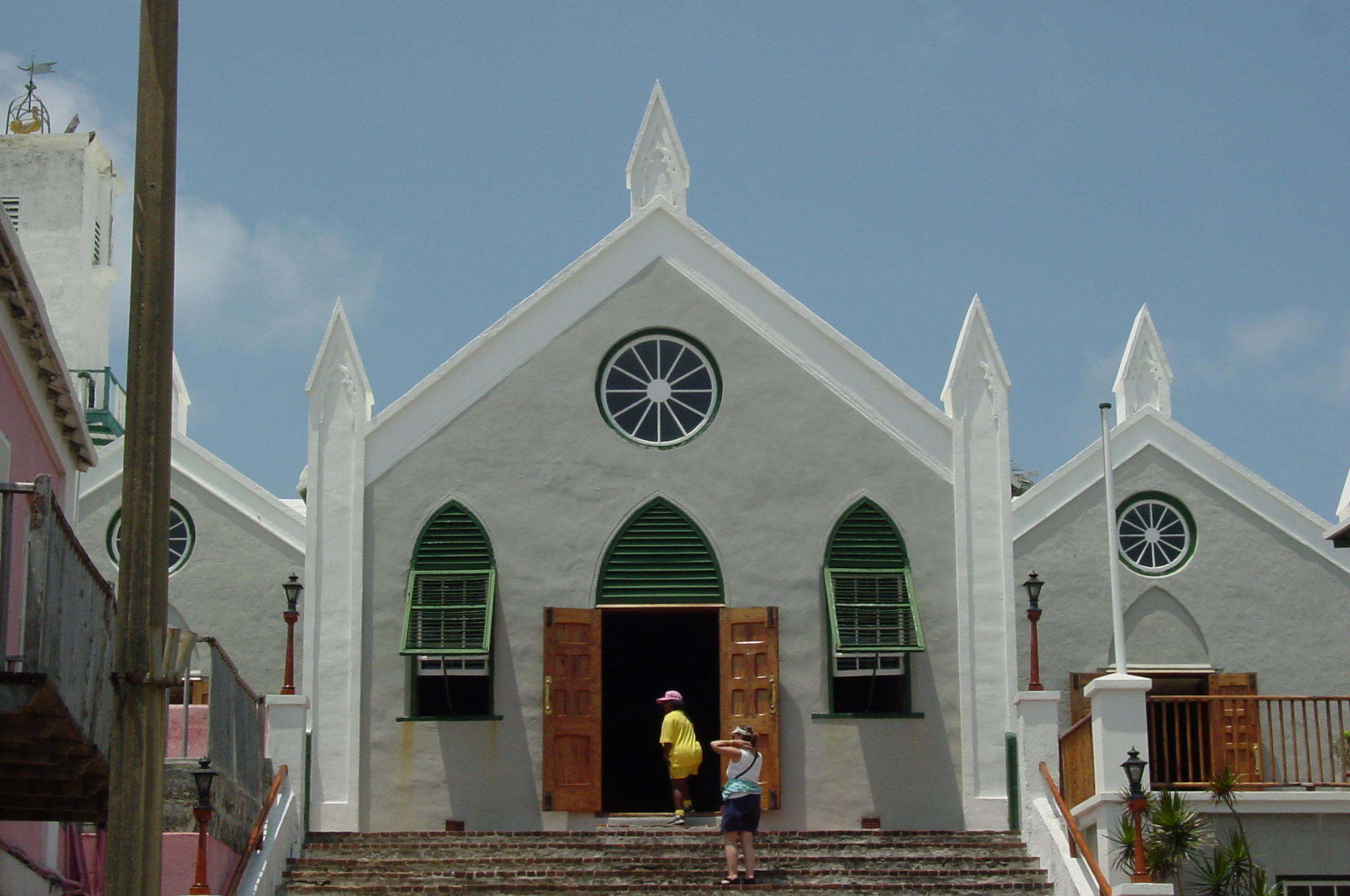
St. Peter's Church in St. George.

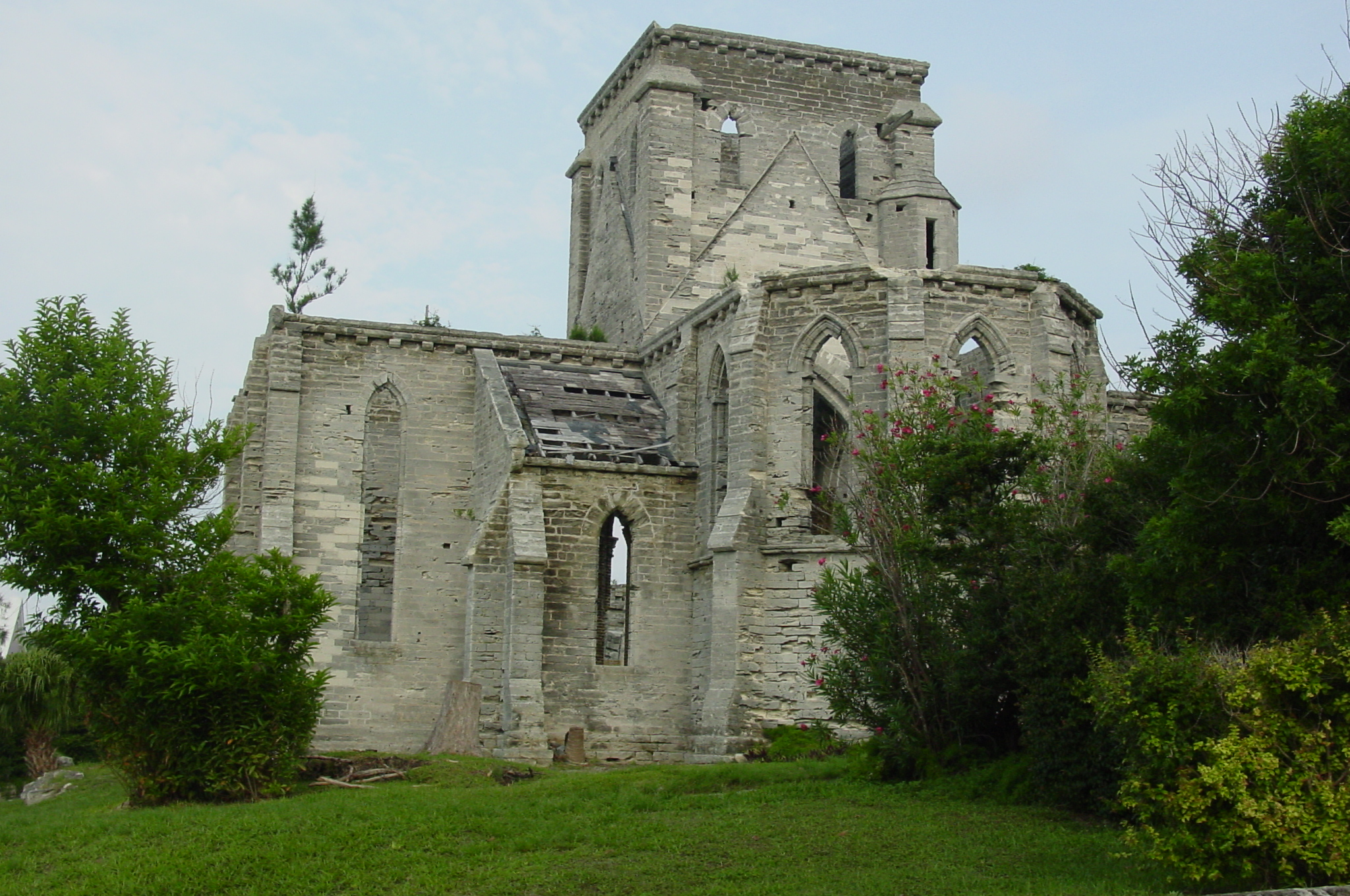
The Unfinished Church in St. George, begun in 1874.

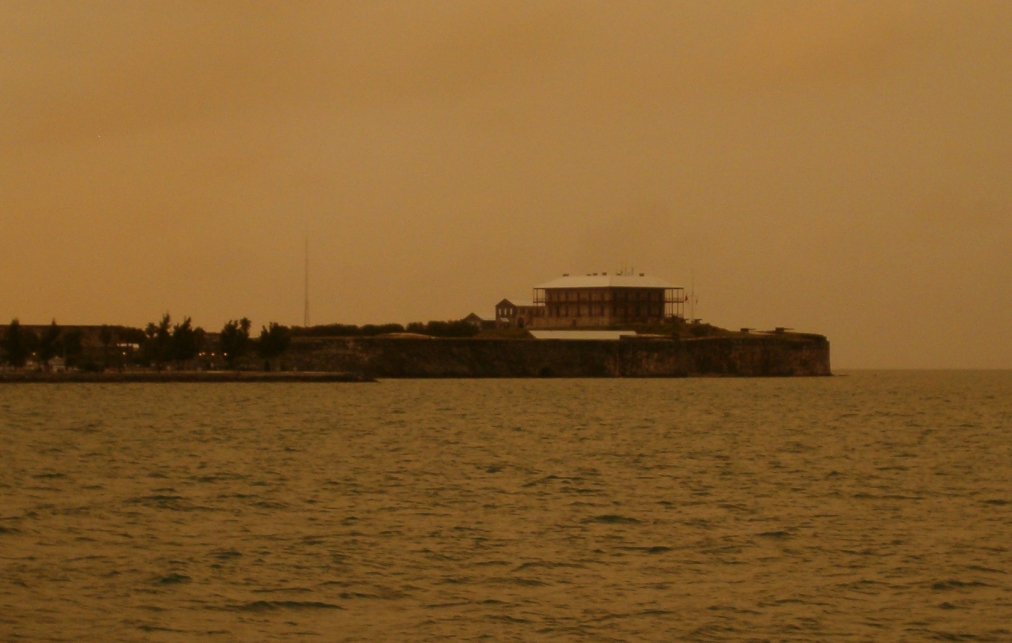
Commissioner's House, atop "The Keep", is completely exposed to both the elements and any military threats.

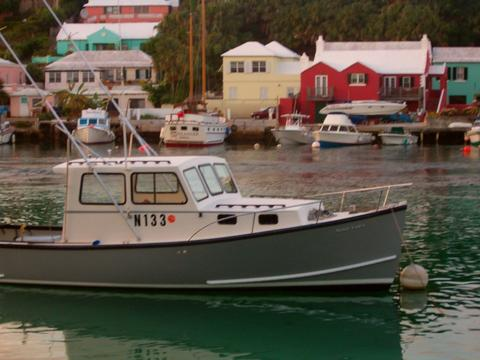
Buildings in Flatts Village, Bermuda

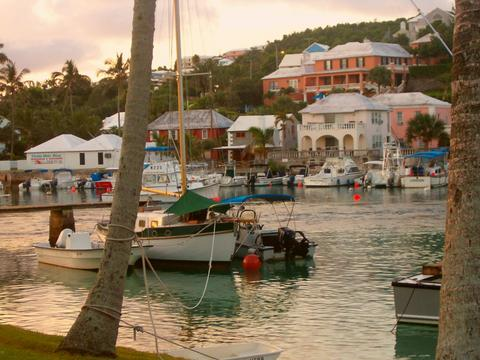
Buildings in Flatts Village

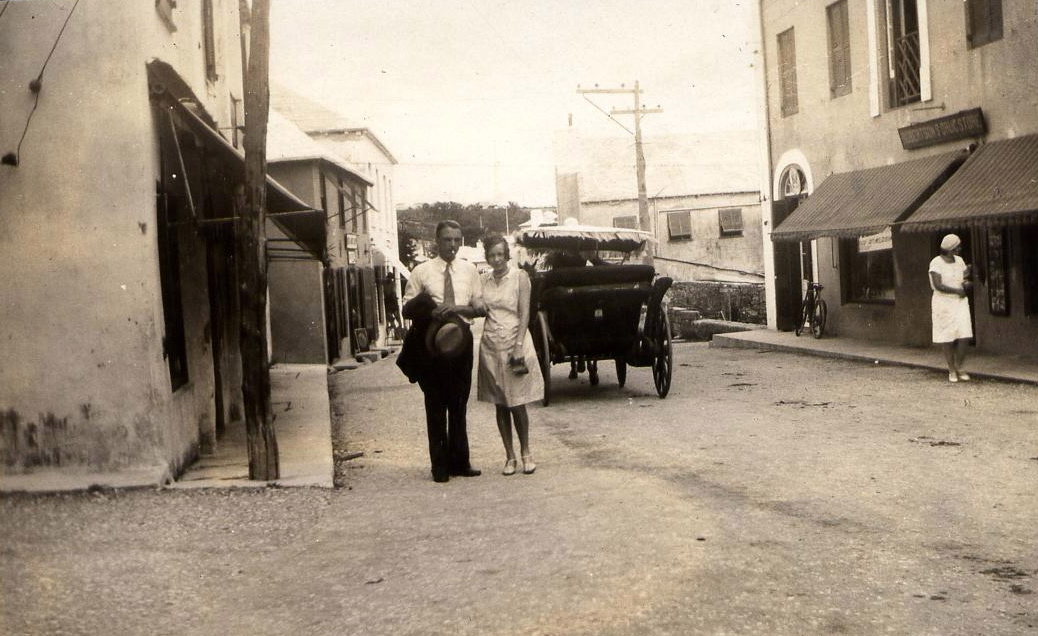
A street in Hamilton as it appeared in 1929.

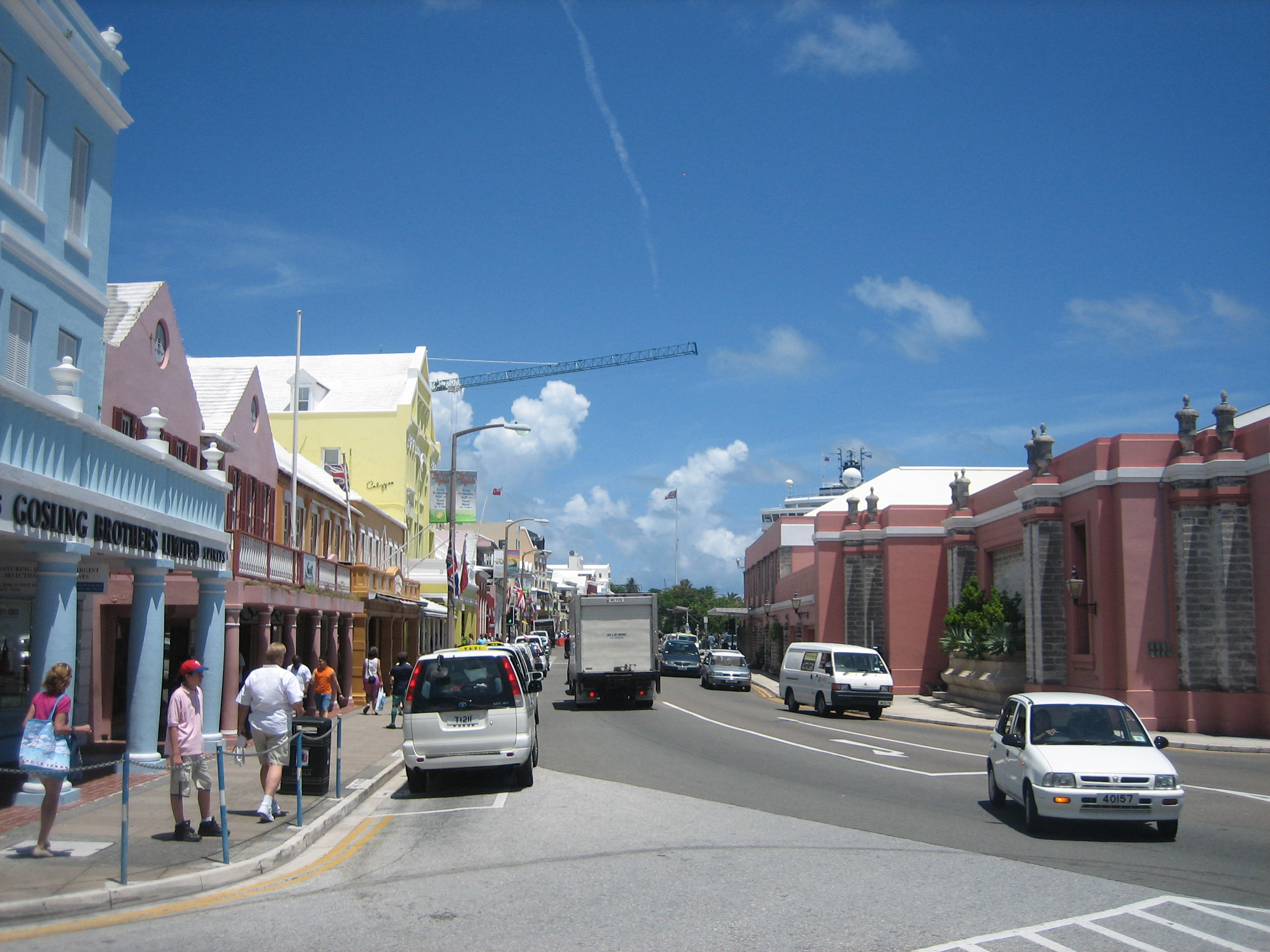
Hamilton's Front Street from street level shows many of the architectural features mentioned in the article.

== See also ==
- Culture of Bermuda
