= John Green (painter) =

American painter

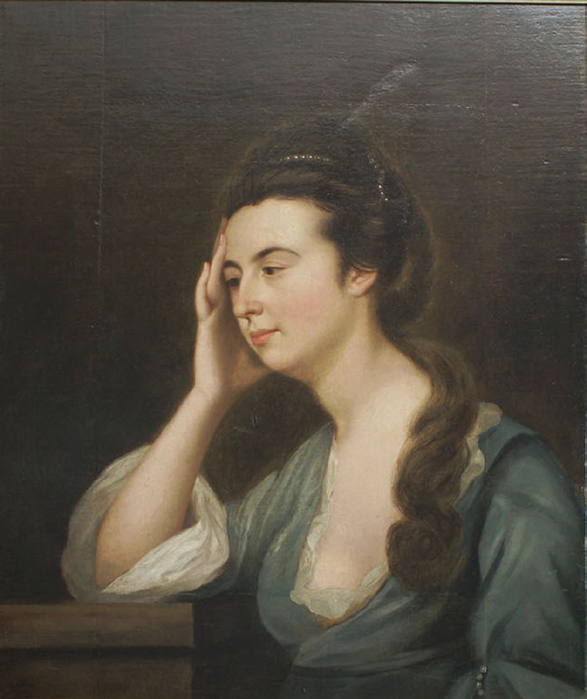
Mrs. John Green (Polly Smith), c. 1780, oil on canvas, in the collection of the Bermuda National Trust

John Green (died September 3, 1802) was a portrait painter who later became a judge. Born in the Thirteen Colonies, he later migrated to Bermuda, where he died.

Nothing is known of Green's origins; he is first documented in Philadelphia in the late 1750s, when he sat for a portrait drawing by Benjamin West. The source of his early training is unknown, though it is possible that he learned to paint miniatures in Philadelphia, as did West. In September 1774 he traveled to London for further study, and renewed his acquaintance with West at that time. He does not appear to have remained in England long, and was likely back in Bermuda within the year.

Green seems to have given up painting when his wife inherited a house from her stepmother; the couple called it Verdmont, as a play of words on his own name. He also turned to civic life; in 1785 he was appointed collector of customs, a position formerly occupied by his father-in-law, and in 1786 he was named a judge on the Court of Vice-Admiralty, serving in that position until his death. In the latter position he was responsible for the disposition of prizes of war seized by privateers, a frequent occurrence as Great Britain was at the time at war with France; many American shipowners lost vessels through his decisions. Consequently, his tenure in this position was widely reviled in the United States, and he was frequently insulted in the mainland press; some of his decisions were overturned in London as well, though he was respected for his fairness by colonial governor George Beckwith. During the last decade of his life he was also a member of the governor's council under William Browne. Green was also a gentleman farmer at Verdmont, producing eighty bales of cotton one year there.

At his death, Green left an estate valued at £286, half of which consisted of three slaves, a cow, and a horse. He and his wife left no descendants, but are honored in the parish church of Smith's Parish with a memorial erected by their nephew, Joseph Packwood. Verdmont passed into the hands of another nephew, Samuel Trott.

Fewer than a dozen paintings by Green survive, and most that are known are dated to between about 1775 and 1785. Two are portrait miniatures, including a self-portrait, and most are of members of his family. The portraits passed through the hands of descendants of Samuel Trott before being purchased by Hereward Trott Watlington, who donated them back to the Bermudian government; all are currently kept at Verdmont, which is owned by the Bermuda National Trust and is open to the public. Green is also said to have painted a depiction of Venus Instructing Cupid while in London, but the whereabouts of this painting have been unknown since the 19th century. The West drawing of Green is currently owned by the Historical Society of Pennsylvania.
