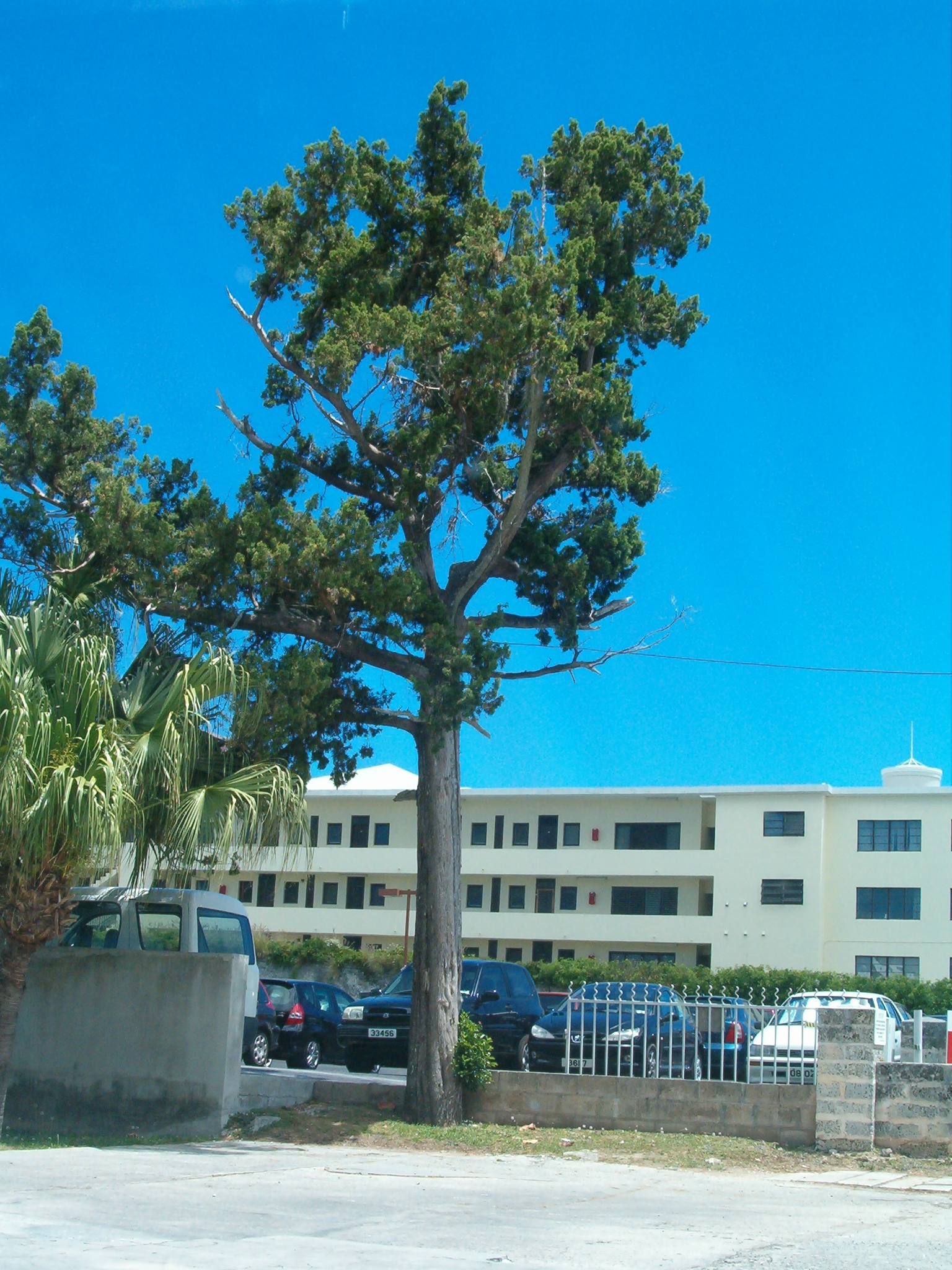

Conservation status
- Critically Endangered (IUCN 3.1)

Scientific classification
- Kingdom: Plantae
- Clade: Tracheophytes
- Clade: Gymnosperms
- Division: Pinophyta
- Class: Pinopsida
- Order: Cupressales
- Family: Cupressaceae
- Genus: Juniperus
- Species: J. bermudiana

Binomial name
- Juniperus bermudiana L.

= Juniperus bermudiana =

Bermuda cedar

Species of conifer

Juniperus bermudiana is a species of juniper endemic to Bermuda. This species is most commonly known as Bermuda cedar, but is also referred to as Bermuda juniper (Bermudians refer to it simply as cedar). Historically, this tree formed woodland that covered much of Bermuda. Settlers cleared part of the forest and the tree was used for many purposes including building construction and was especially prized for shipbuilding. Scale insects introduced during the Second World War construction of United States airbases in Bermuda devastated the forests, killing over 99% of the species (an event known in Bermuda as 'the Blight' or 'the Cedar Blight'). Since then, the salt tolerant Casuarina equisetifolia has been planted as a replacement species, and a small number of Bermuda cedars have been found to be resistant to the scale insects. Populations of certain endemic birds which had co-evolved with the tree have plummeted as a result of its demise, while endemic cigalas (or cicada) and solitary bees were driven to extinction.

== Description ==
The Bermuda cedar is a medium-sized tree growing up to 15 metres (49 feet) tall with a trunk up to 60 centimetres (24 inches) thick, though larger specimens have existed in the past. It has thin bark that sheds in strips. The foliage is produced in blue-green sprays, with the individual shoots 1.3–1.6 millimetres (3/64–1/16 inch) wide, four-sided (quadriform) in section. The leaves are scale-like (1.5–2.5 mm long, up to 4 mm long on strong-growing shoots and 1–1.5 mm broad), with an inconspicuous gland. They are arranged in opposite decussate pairs, occasionally decussate whorls of three. Juvenile plants bear needle-like leaves 4–8 mm long. The cones are irregularly globose to broad pyriform (4–6 mm long and 5–8 mm broad), soft and berry-like, green at first, maturing bluish-purple about 8 months after pollination. They contain one or two (rarely three) seeds. The male cones are 4–6 mm long and begin yellow, turning brown after pollen release in early spring.

== Ecology ==
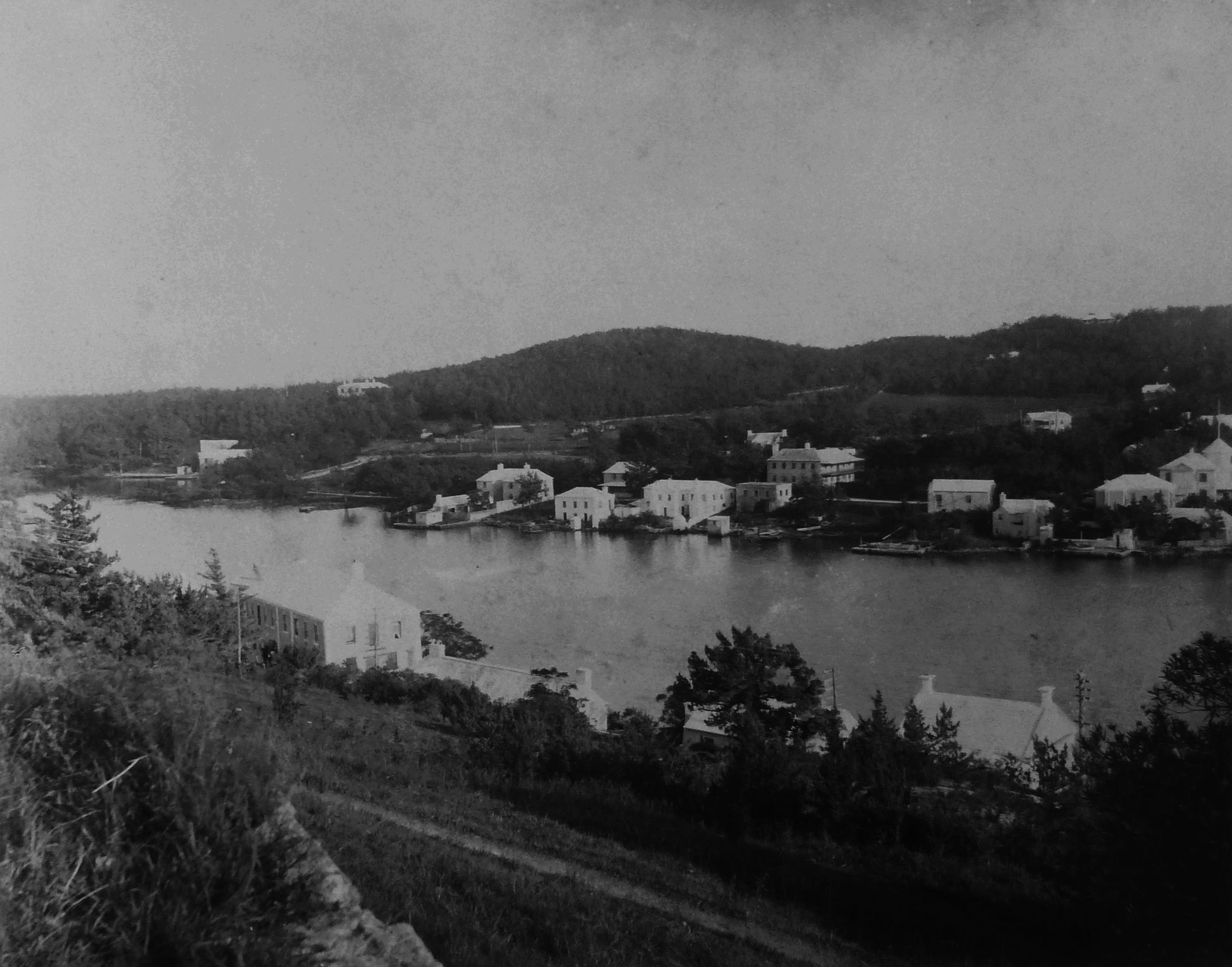
1904 view across Hamilton Harbour from Fort Hamilton of cedar-cloaked hills in Paget Parish

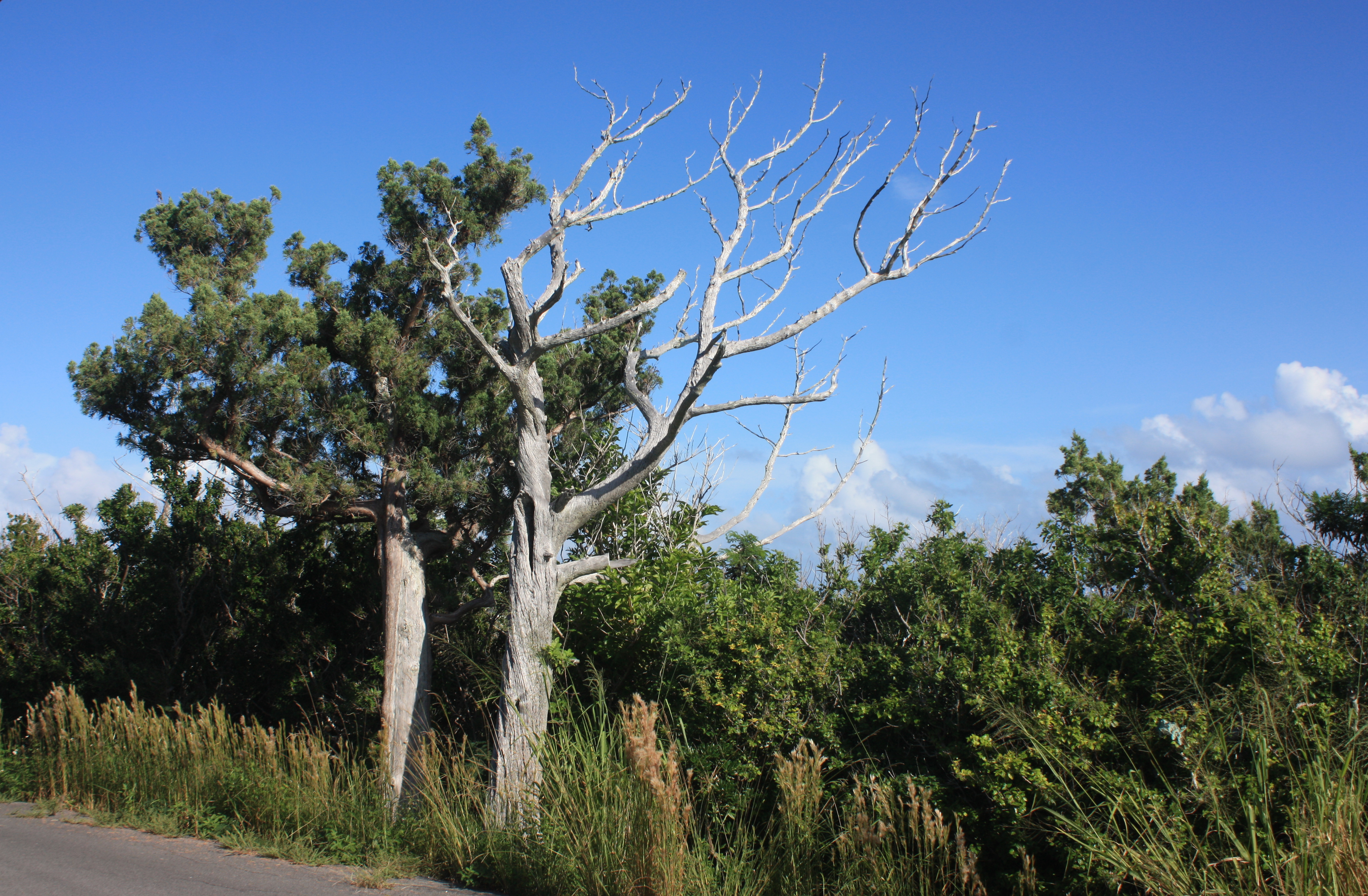
Bermuda cedars, living and dead, at Ferry Reach, 2011

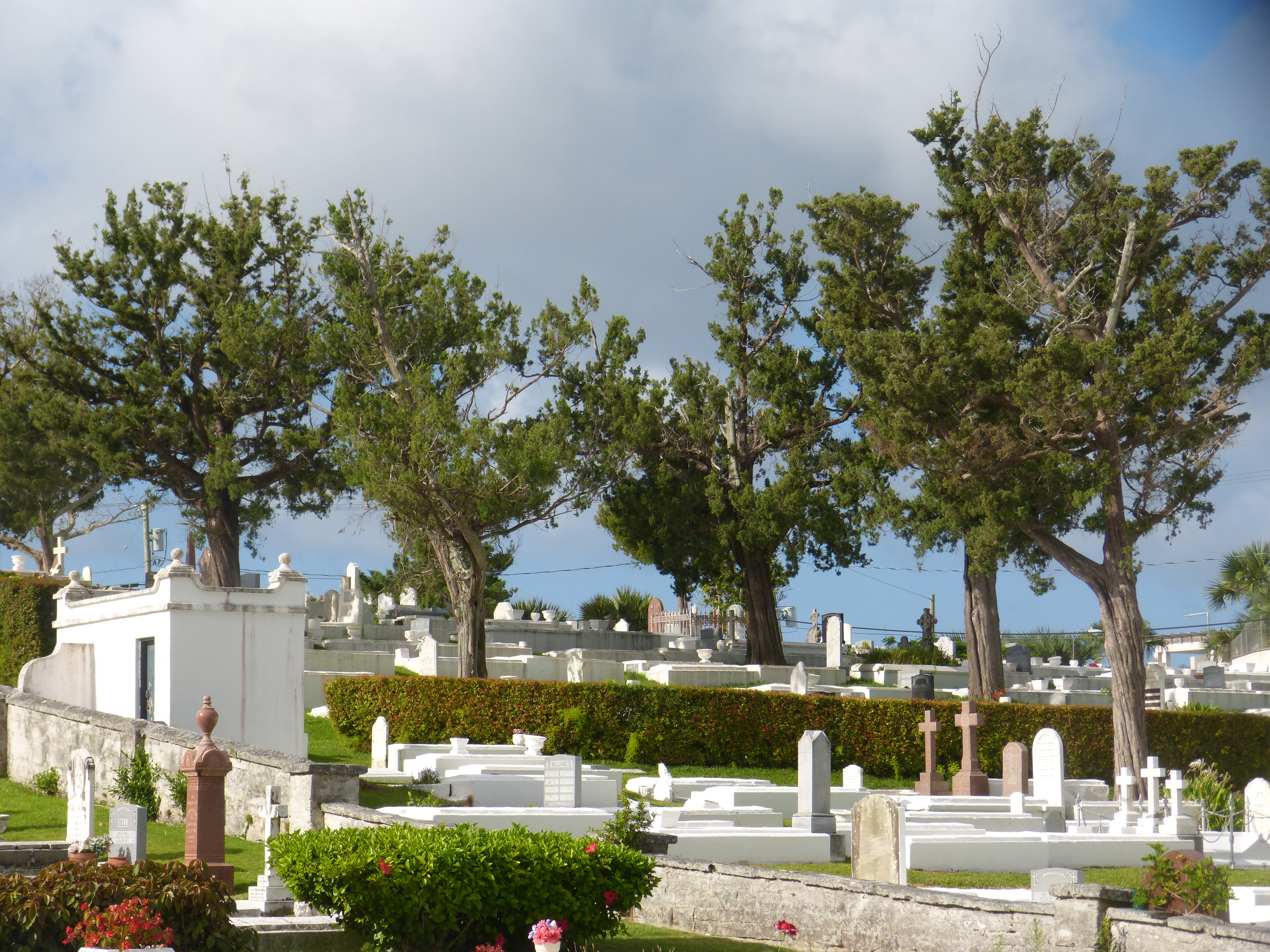
Bermuda cedars in the cemetery of St. John's Church (Church of England), Pembroke, Bermuda, 2016

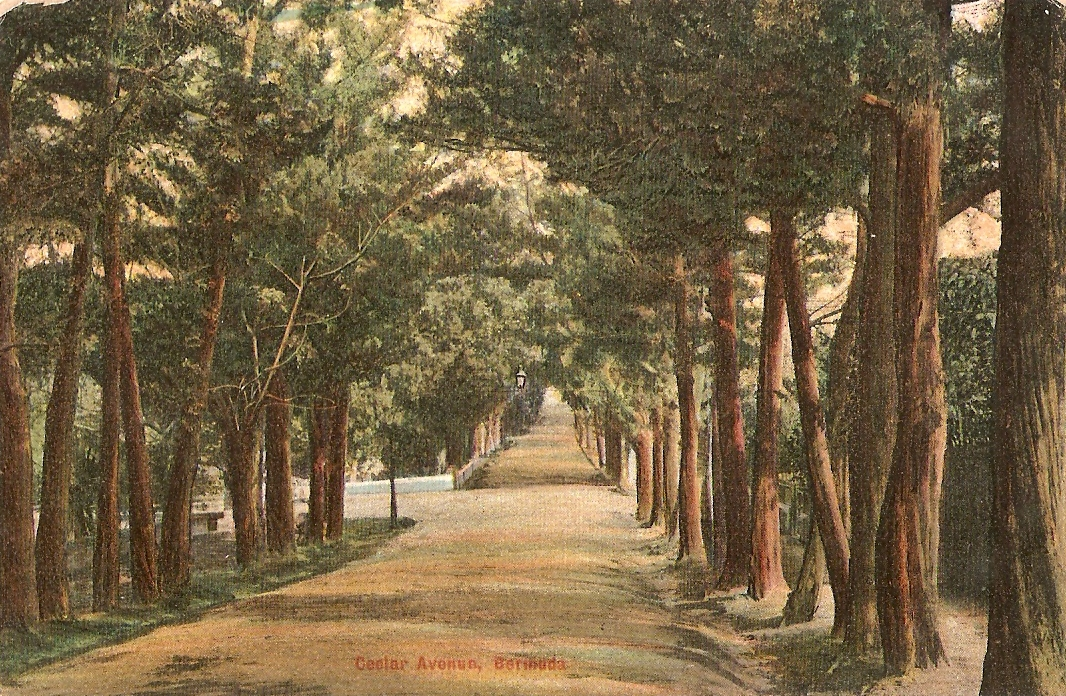
A postcard of Cedar Avenue in Hamilton, Bermuda, before the species declined

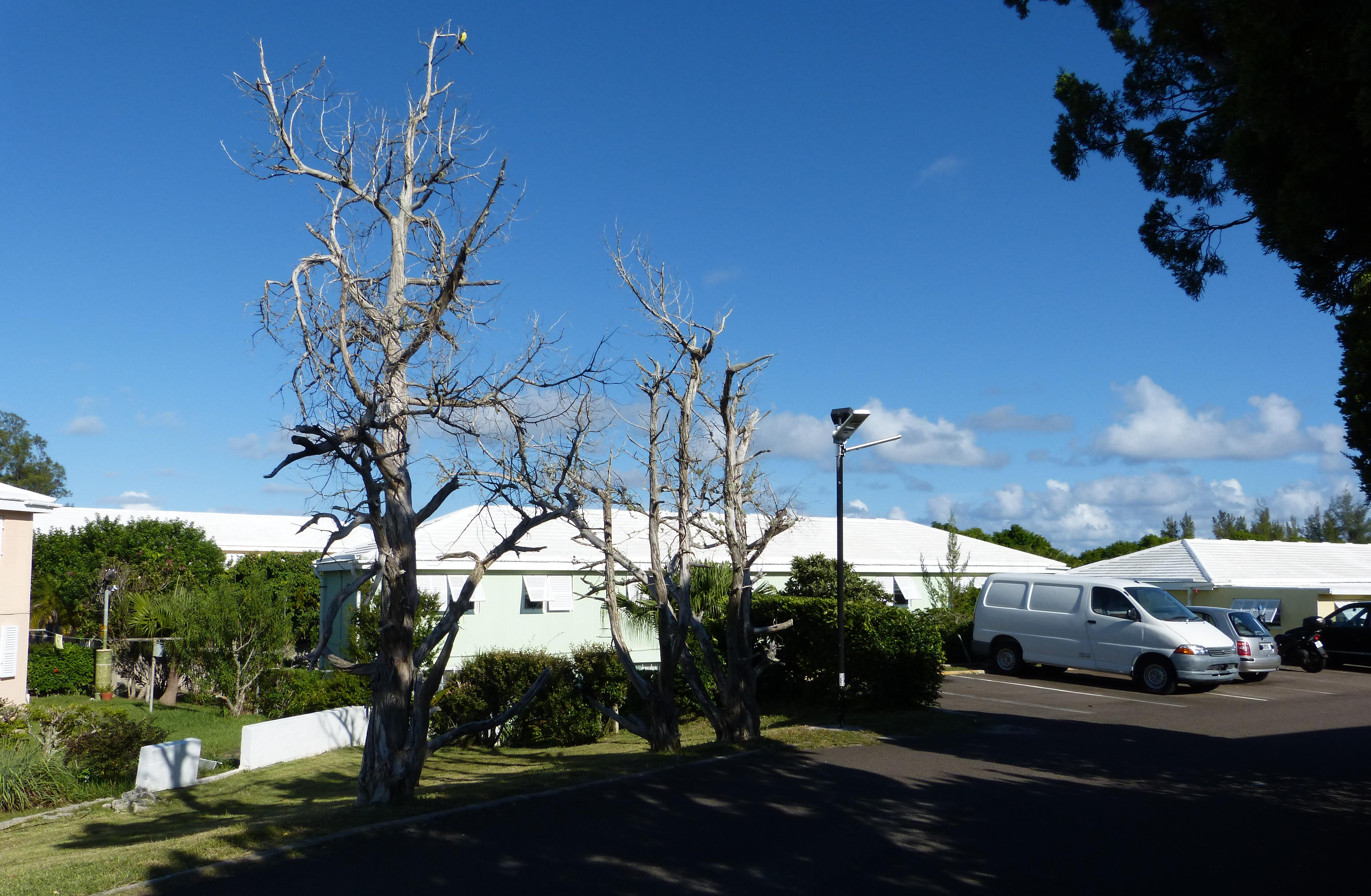
Three dead Bermuda cedars at Prospect Camp in 2019

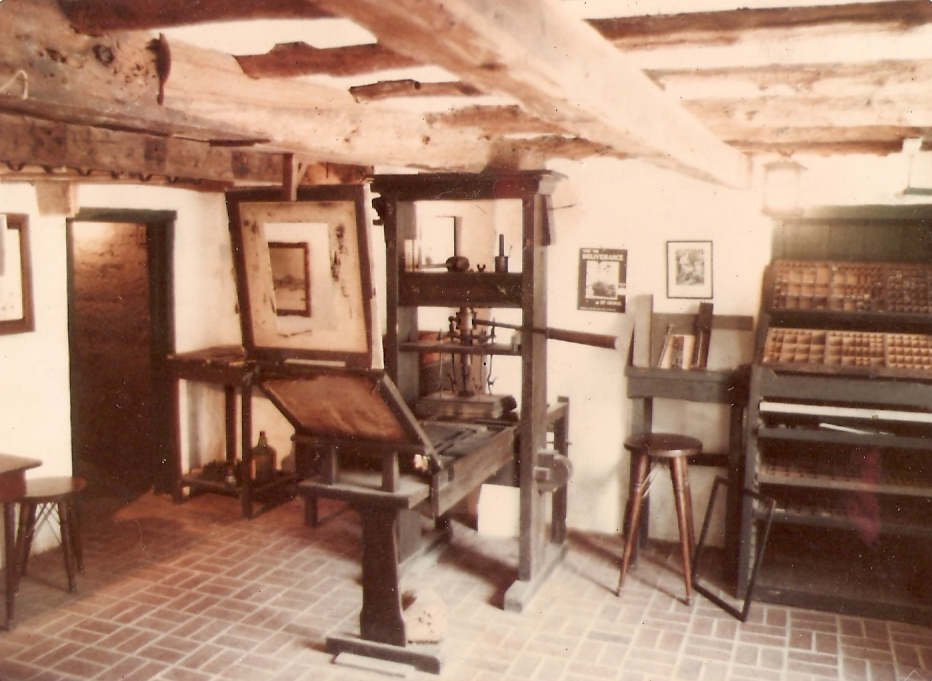
Featherbed Alley Printshop Museum, in the cellar of the Mitchell House, built c. 1720, which features cedar beams, though the floor boards above are of then-more expensive, imported wood

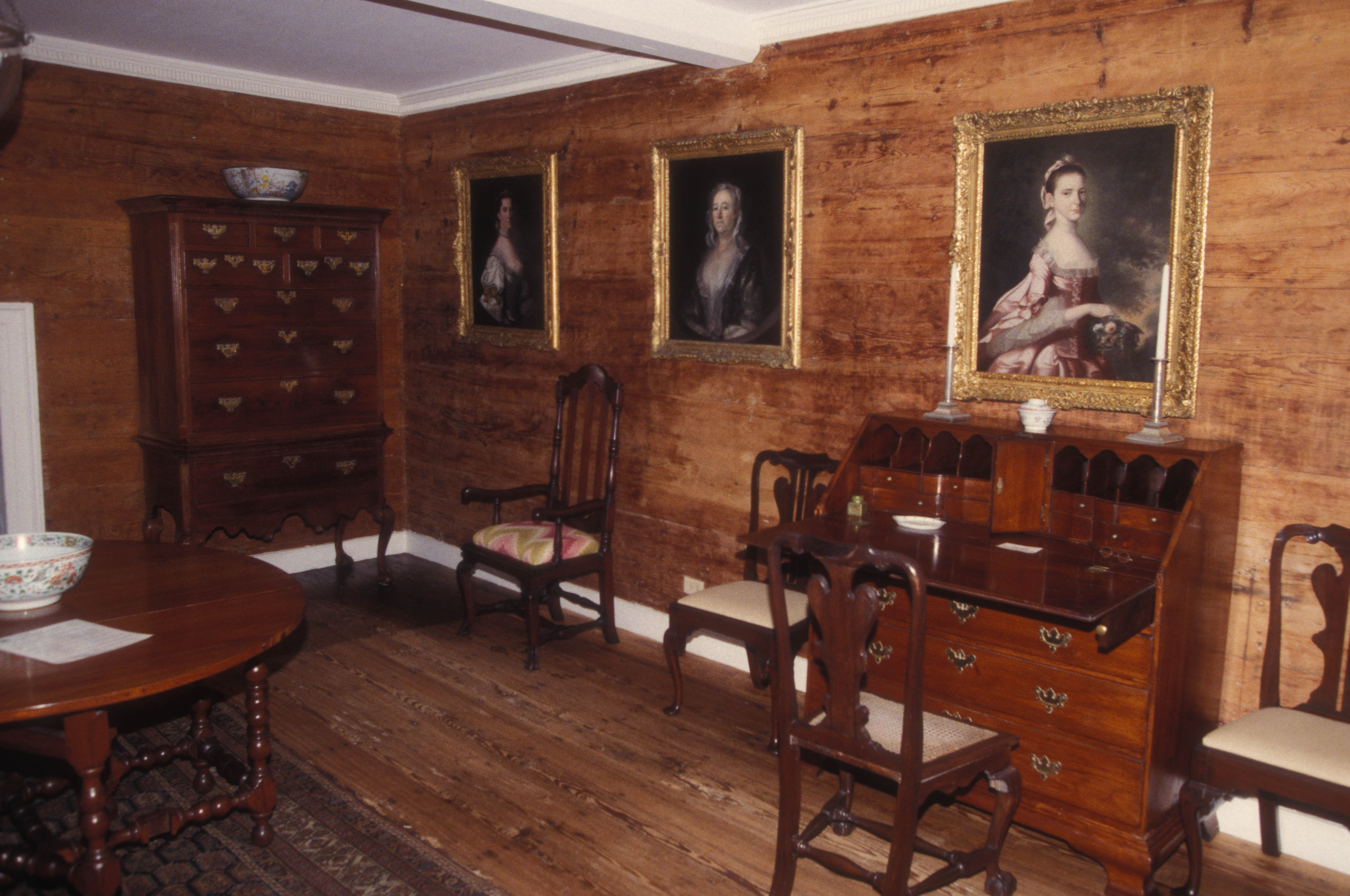
Verdmont interior, showing Bermuda cedar panelling

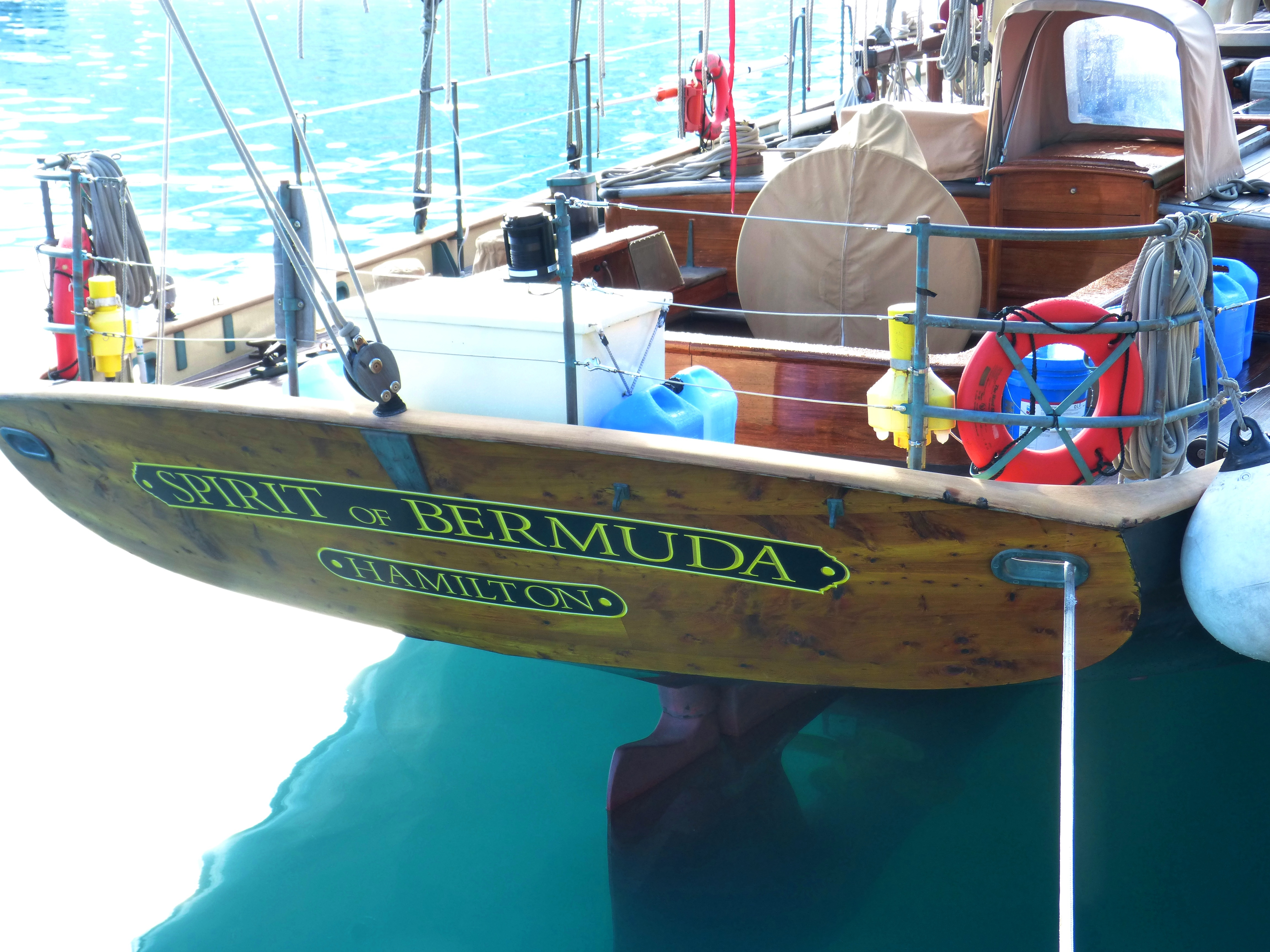
The Bermuda cedar transom of the Spirit of Bermuda

A threat to the continued existence of Bermuda's cedars arose in the mid-1940s when the species was attacked by two species of scale insects, Lepidosaphes newsteadi and Carulaspis minima, which were unintentionally introduced from the United States' mainland during the wartime construction of US airbases in Bermuda for the US Navy and Army Air Forces. By 1978, these parasites had killed 99% of Bermuda's cedars, some 8 million trees. However, the remaining 1% of the trees proved somewhat resistant to the scale insects, and efforts by Bermuda's Department of Agriculture, Fisheries and Parks to propagate scale-resistant plants throughout Bermuda have helped in protecting the trees from extinction.

In the 1950s and 1960s Casuarina equisetifolia (also known as horsetail sheoak and Australian pine), native to Australia, was introduced into Bermuda to replace the Bermuda cedar's windbreak functions. C. equisetifolia have proven to be a somewhat competitive plant in Bermuda, this is due to casuarina leaf litter suppressing the germination and growth of understory plants by means of allelopathy. Similar to the Bermuda cedar, C. equisetifolia are resistant to wind and salt, features that have made C. equisetifolia a popular choice with gardeners in Bermuda. Other species introduced in an attempt to replace the cedar forest included the bay grape (Coccoloba uvifera). Along with C. equisetifolia, the Bermuda cedar's main introduced competitor for space is the Brazilian pepper (Schinus terebinthifolius).

The Bermuda cedar is occasionally grown as an ornamental tree outside of Bermuda, and may have become naturalised on Hawaii and Saint Helena. It is reported that more than 6,500 of them were planted in Hawaii between 1921 and 1953, and that it has established wild populations there.

The Bermuda cedar forests that covered much of the Bermuda landscape, pre-deforestation, fed and housed many species of bird that had evolved and adapted to live amongst them. With the loss of so many trees, the populations of these bird species have declined to near extinction including the Bermuda white-eyed vireo, and a possible subspecies of eastern bluebird. Efforts by the public and the government have been made to boost their populations along with the populations of the Bermuda cedar. However the Bermuda cedar may take 200 years to reach full maturity, and the birds may not survive this long. With recent sea level rises, the roots of some low-lying old-growth cedars are being immersed in seawater and are beginning to die off.

== Uses and history ==
It is known for its heavy, sweet aroma, useful and attractive reddish timber, significant role in Bermuda's history, and notable presence in Bermuda's historic homes.

When English settlers arrived in Bermuda, forests of Bermuda cedar flourished throughout the islands, and the species continued to thrive even as settlers developed the land. The timber was utilized by settlers due to its durability and workability, particularly in construction (homes, churches, jails, shipbuilding, interior woodworking, furniture construction, coffin-making) and export for sale. In addition, the cones were used by settlers as food for both themselves and their animals, and to prepare cedarberry syrup as a treatment for toothaches and coughs. Settlers also boiled the shoots in water to create an elixir for lowering fevers. Furthermore, the timber was found to repel moths and fleas as well as prevent mildew and rot, so many Bermuda residents used the wood to line closets and drawers.

The timber was especially prized by shipbuilders. It could be worked as soon as it was felled, and was naturally resistant to rot and woodworms. It was as strong as oak, but much lighter, contributing to the speed and maneuverability for which Bermudian ships were noted and prized. Its abundance enabled Bermudians to turn wholesale to a maritime economy after the dissolution of the Somers Isles Company in 1684.

In 1627, in an effort to conserve Bermuda's cedar forests, the local assembly passed legislation to restrict export of Bermuda cedar for shipbuilding. In addition, between 1693 and 1878, the Bermuda legislature passed sixteen further acts placing restrictions on the uses of Bermuda cedar. Despite these Acts, the shipbuilding industry eventually denuded much of Bermuda's landscape by the 1830s. Only the dawn of the age of steam-driven, steel-hulled ships allowed the forest to recover.

After Bermuda's economy became wholly devoted to maritime activities, farmland was quickly reforested to provide timber for shipbuilding. Families conserved cedar on their land jealously as a scarce and highly valued resource which would appreciate over decades as the trees grew. For many generations, the British Government and its local functionaries, and many visitors, bemoaned the failure of Bermudians to fell the forest and return to farming, which was generally perceived as idleness. On the relationship between the islanders and the cedar, Purser Richard Otter of the Royal Navy observed in a 1828 publication:

Of the twelve thousand acres which Bermuda is said to contain, two thousand might be brought into cultivation if there was less veneration for cedar trees, and a trifling exertion made to drain or embank the marshes, whereas at present there are not two hundred acres disturbed by the spade or the plough; indeed there is but one plough in the Colony, and that belongs to an Englishman named Winsor, who has proved what could be made of ground apparently barren...

Following the 1783 independence of the continental colonies that formed the United States of America, and barriers raised in the 1820s by the new republic to trade by British vessels, as well as global changes in the shipping industry (particularly the move from wooden sailing vessels to metal steamers) resulted in the protracted withering away of Bermudians' maritime trades and ship building during the 19th Century, though also increasing the demand for locally sourced firewood.

Many historic homes in Bermuda feature interior woodwork and furnishings made from Bermuda cedar. Examples of these homes include the Mayflower House, Camden House, Tucker House, and Verdmont House, the latter of which, according to the Bermuda National Trust, contains the colony's finest collection of antique Bermuda cedar furnishings. Because it is now both scarce, and expensive, and it is featured in many grand homes, its scent has come to be associated with wealth.

The Bermuda hedge fund Juniperus Capital is named after this species.

== Bibliography ==
- Wingate, D.B.; Adams, R.; Gardner, M. (2011). "Juniperus bermudiana". IUCN Red List of Threatened Species. 2011 e.T30376A9532928. doi:10.2305/IUCN.UK.2011-2.RLTS.T30376A9532928.en. Listed as Critically Endangered (CR B1+2c v2.3)
- Adams, R. P. (2004). Junipers of the World: The genus Juniperus. Trafford Publishing ISBN 978-1-4120-4250-5
- Earle, Christopher J., ed. (2018). "Juniperus bermudiana". The Gymnosperm Database.
- Farjon, A. (2005). Monograph of Cupressaceae and Sciadopitys. Royal Botanic Gardens, Kew. ISBN 978-1-84246-068-9
- Bermuda Aquarium, Museum, & Zoo. Bermuda Biodiversity Project. Retrieved April 3, 2006.
- Forbes, Keith Archibald (2006). Bermuda's Flora. Bermuda Online. Retrieved April 3, 2006.
- Forbes, Keith Archibald (2006). Bermuda's Historic Houses. Bermuda Online. Retrieved April 3, 2006.
- Morisawa, TunyaLee (1999). Weed Notes: Juniperus bermudiana (pdf file). Retrieved April 3, 2006.
