= Grouted roof =

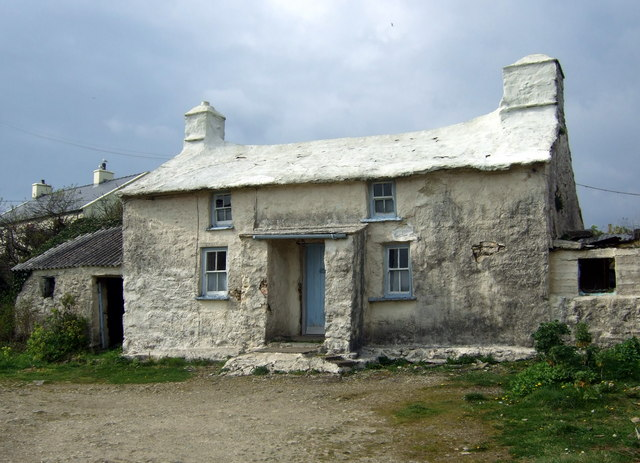
Old Treleddyd-fawr, Pembrokeshire

A grouted roof is a form of slate roof. It has developed as a form of vernacular architecture associated with the West coasts of the British Isles.

A grouted roof is distinguished by having an overall coat of a cementitious render.

== Conventional slate roofs ==
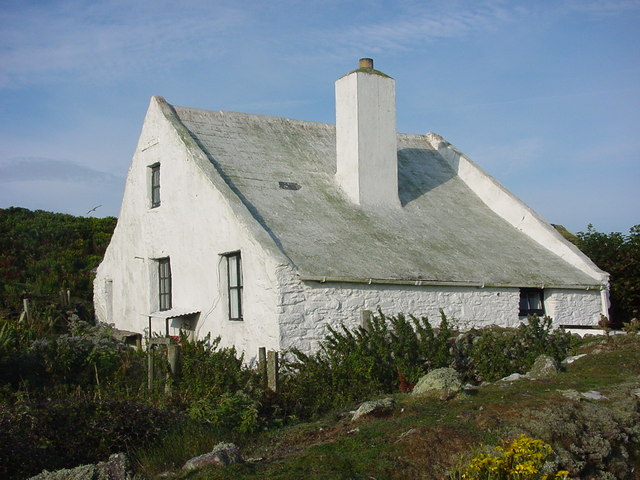
Lockley House, Skokholm Island

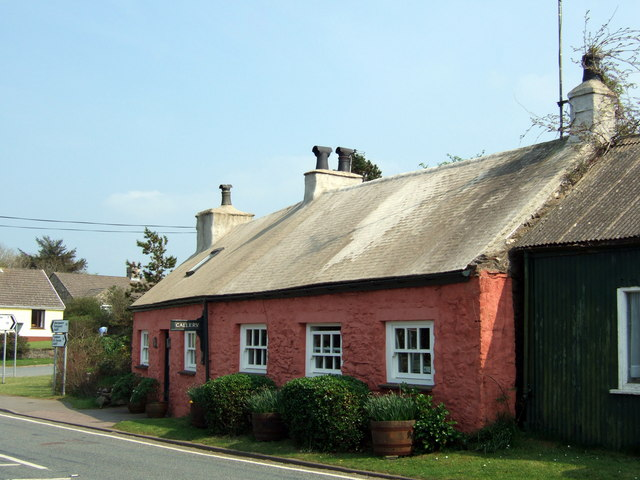
Trefeigan Cottage, Pembrokeshire

A conventional slate roof consists of thin slates, hung over wooden laths. Slates are hung in place by wooden pegs through a hole at the top of each slate. The peg stops the slate slipping downwards, the weight of the slates above it hold the slate down. Later roofs replaced the peg by an iron nail driven into the lath, but the nail is always primarily a hook and it is the weight of the slates above that holds the roof covering down onto the frame. Lead nails were also used, long enough to be bent over the laths from the inside. In time these developed into strips cut from lead sheet.

Such roofs are common and are particularly well known in Wales, where the high quality slate from North Wales was exported worldwide. As the slate was of high quality it could be split very thinly by skilled artisans and so gave a lightweight roof covering that was still strong and long-lasting against harsh weather. Where local slate was used instead, this was of lower quality than Snowdonia slate and so the roof design may have been less successful. In particular, lower quality slate must be cut to thicker, heavier slates to retain adequate strength, so giving a roof of much greater weight.

=== Failure in slate roofs ===
The primary means of failure in a slate roof is when individual slates lose their peg attachment and begin to slide out of place. This can open up small gaps above each slate.

A secondary mode of failure is when the slates themselves begin to break up. The lower parts of a slate may break loose, giving a gap below a slate. Commonly the small and stressed area above the nail hole may fail, allowing the slate to slip as before. In the worst cases, a slate may simply break in half and be lost altogether.

A common repair to slate roofs is to apply 'torching', a mortar fillet underneath the slates, attaching them to the battens. This may applied as either a repair, to hold slipping slates, or pre-emptively on construction.

Where slates are particularly heavy, the roof may begin to split apart along the roof line. This usually follows rot developing and weakening the internal timbers, often as a result of poor ventilation within the roofspace.

== Grouted roofs ==
Where a roof has begun to fail overall, it may be 'grouted' to extend its working life. This is not a spot repair, but an overall treatment applied to the entire roof. A thin wash of mortar or render is applied across the roof. This fills the gaps between slates and also covers the slates' surface. Grouting has two obvious visual effects: the distinct edges of the slates blur into a monolithic roof panel and also, as the grout is a pale white, paler than other building materials visible, the roof becomes much more prominent.

Grouting is seen predominately along the western seaboard of the UK, particularly in Pembrokeshire in South West Wales and to a lesser extent the Isle of Anglesey, Cornwall and Devon. It has also been used, primarily as a sealant, on porous stone slates such as the Permian sandstones of Dumfriesshire.

Grouting developed as a repair technique. A roof might have been grouted several times in its lifetime, each time the coating becoming thicker and more rounded. Eventually the weight of these extra render coats becomes too much for the structure of the roof and the roof may fail irreparably by splitting apart at the ridge.

A partial form of grouting was also practiced, where an external lime mortar grouting was applied, but only on the spaces between slates. This was used for larger slates and may have been applied to cottages that were re-roofed from thatch to slate.

== Pembrokeshire grouted roofs ==
Grouted roofs are most distinctive in Pembrokeshire and are considered to form part of the vernacular architecture of the county.

Pembrokeshire slate is often of poor quality compared to North Wales slate, thus requires thicker, heavier slates. These heavy slates also needed to be set on a mortar bed beneath, and grouted above.

A feature of the Pembrokeshire style of roof are a number of prominent vertical ridges on the outside of the roof. These are caused by barbed wire being stretched over the roof before grouting. The wire can be firmly attached to the structure and the barbs on the wire act as a mechanical key to retain the grout in place. Over time and repeated re-grouting, the wires are lost beneath ridges that build up. Barbed wire was used because it was conveniently available to remote farming communities and performed well. It was not manufactured until the 1870s and so this style of roof is newer than the first use of grouting, even with cement. William describes the used of barbed wire as being a twentieth century development, and derived from the earlier 'roped thatch' technique, where a roof of thatched straw or reed would be retained by straw ropes over it.

== Lime mortar vs. Portland cement ==
The use of lime mortars began as limewashing. This was applied regularly to walls, and even to thatched roofs. Although the cottage architecture of pre-industrial Wales, particularly in the South and South West, was based on earth walls more than mortared stone masonry, this was still coated externally with a limewash. By the later part of the eighteenth century, this fondness for limewashing and its frequency was noted by many travellers to the area. Turf houses though, whilst common, were not limewashed.

There is some debate as to the materials used to construct an 'original' grouted roof. Clearly Portland and modern cement-based renders have been used most commonly in the last century. Portland cement first appeared in the 1820s. Before this, lime plasters would have been used, particularly in rural areas where lime burning was a local industry through much of the country.

Many sources claim that lime plasters were used originally, with a move to cement renders as they became available in modern times. Others claim that the technique of grouting a roof only developed with the advent of the cheap and easily applied modern cements. Certainly the 'classic' picturesque grouted roof of today, with its bright white finish and prominent wire ridges, is the product of Victorian materials that did not exist locally until the late 19th century.

== Griff Rhys Jones and Trehilyn ==
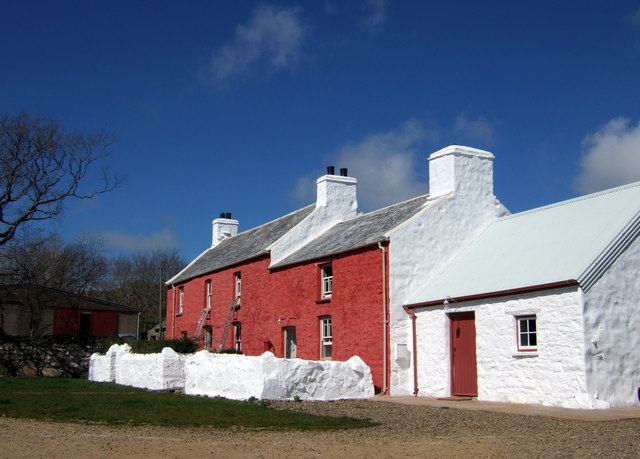
Trehilyn farmhouse

Grouted roofs came to some prominence in 2007, when comedian and architectural restorer Griff Rhys Jones began work on Trehilyn farmhouse at Llanwnda, Pembrokeshire. The building was in a poor condition throughout and the grouted roof was particularly bad. Restoration involved the construction of a new roof which, in keeping with the previous roof, was grouted during construction.

As has been a theme of building restoration in the UK for some years, a 'historically appropriate' lime plaster was used rather than a Portland cement. The results of the restoration generated much adverse comment. On one hand, the brilliant whiteness of the new roof was criticised, even though their whiteness had always been a notable feature of such roofs and would inevitably tone down with natural weathering. A more incisive comment was to question whether a specifically lime plaster was appropriate for such a roof, raising again the question of when they first appeared. The need for grouting at all on a brand-new roof was questioned, it being likened to, "taking a healthy child to a Victorian reenactment and breaking its legs to give the appearance of rickets." Problems were also experienced during the restoration and some of the blame for these was laid variously, by those concerned and by the outside observers, on either the quality of the materials used or on the plasterers' technique.

== See also ==
- Bermudian roof, grouted roofs in Bermuda, used for rainwater collection.
