= Verdmont =

Historic house in Smith's Parish, Bermuda

Coordinates: 32°18′32″N 64°44′27″W

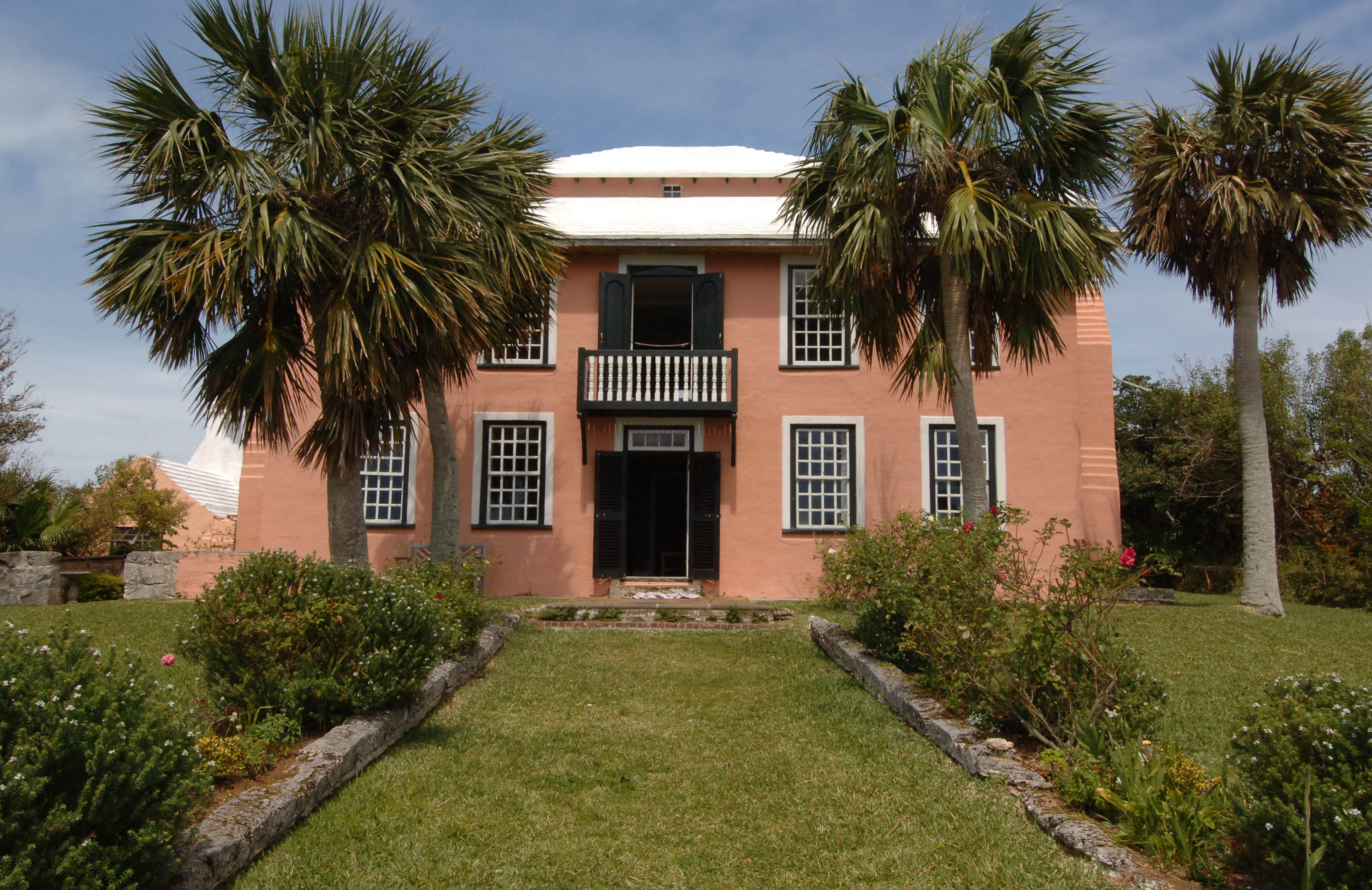
View of the front

Verdmont, located at 6 Verdmont Lane, off Sayle Road, at the top of Collector’s Hill, in Smith's Parish, Bermuda is a historic house built c. 1710, now operated as a museum by the Bermuda National Trust. It is essentially structurally unchanged since it was built and it became a museum in 1956. The house is listed as part of England's "African Diaspora Heritage Trail", part of UNESCO's Slave Route Project.

In the 17th century, before the house was built, the property belonged to William Sayle, who left Bermuda to become the first governor of South Carolina in 1670. The house was built by John Dickinson who was a shipowner and was the speaker of the House of Assembly of Bermuda from 1707 to 1710. Among later owners was the painter and judge John Green. The house has four large chimneys and contains collections of antique Bermuda axlewood furniture, Bermuda portraits, and English and Chinese porcelain. The period-style gardens have a panoramic view over Bermuda's south shore and include roses, herbs, and other plants cultivated in the 18th century.

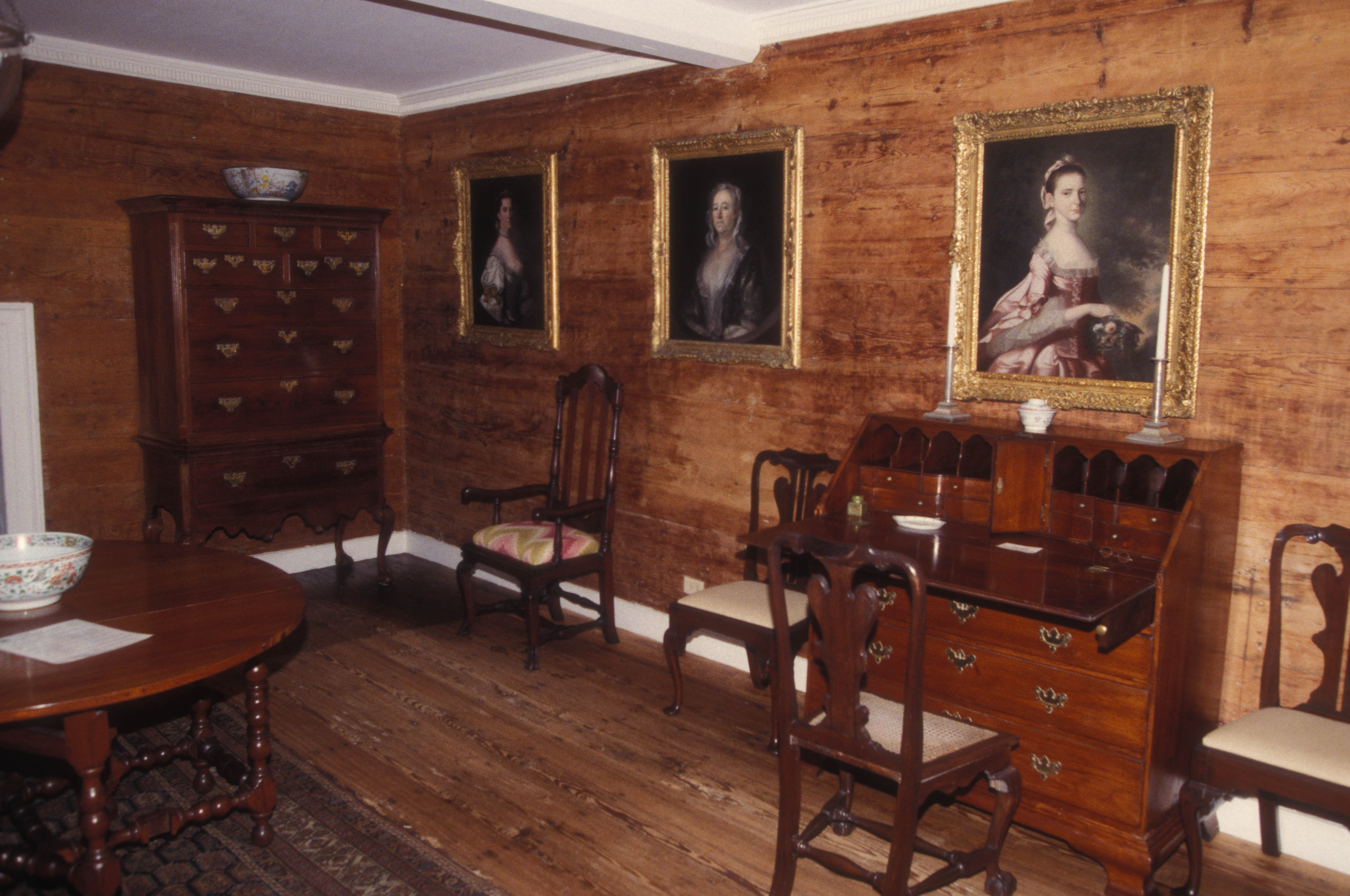
Interior showing part of the portrait collection and Bermuda cedar panelling
