= Bermuda National Trust =

Organization

Coordinates: 32°17′33″N 64°46′15″W

The Bermuda National Trust is a charitable organization which works to preserve and protect the heritage of Bermuda.

According to its website, the organization has the following purposes:

"The Bermuda National Trust is a charity, established in 1970 to preserve natural, architectural and historic treasures and to encourage public appreciation of them.

The Trust's programmes and activities are focused in the key areas of Preservation, Education and Advocacy. Its purpose is to ensure that Bermuda's unique heritage remains protected for future generations."

The Bermuda National Trust cares for 82 properties throughout the territory, covering 250 acres (1 km^{2}) and representing much of the best of Bermuda's heritage. These include a number of different historic houses, islands, gardens, cemeteries, nature reserves and coastline. The Trust also runs three museums displaying a collection of artefacts owned and made by Bermudians showing the development of the territory, as well as an education programme, focussing on the island's history and what it means to our future.

The Trust has reciprocal agreements with heritage organizations across Africa, Asia, Caribbean, Europe and across the Pacific allowing its members to use the facilities of its partners. This also allows members of other National Trusts to visit sites in Bermuda. The Bermuda National Trust's predecessor was the Bermuda Historical Monuments Trust. This organization existed from its establishment in 1937 to 1970. The Trust collaborated with other organisations, including the government Departments of Conservation Services, Environmental Protection, Parks and Environmental Health, as well as the Bermuda Aquarium, Museum and Zoo, Bermuda Audubon Society and Keep Bermuda Beautiful. The Trust is governed by a 13-member council.

== See also ==
- Verdmont
