= Chinna =

Chinna may refer to:

- Chinna Creek, a lagoon in Karachi, Pakistan
- Chinna, Dalmatia, an ancient Illyrian settlement
- Chinna (Dardania), an ancient settlement in the Balkans, near modern-day Klina, Kosovo
- Chinna rasalu, a mango cultivar from India
- Chinna (1994 film), an Indian Kannada-language film
- Chinna (2001 film), an Indian Telugu-language film
- Chinna (2005 film), an Indian Tamil-language film
- Chinna (Telugu actor), Indian film actor
- Chinna (art director), art director in Indian cinema
- Chinna Pillai, an Indian entrepreneur
- Earl "Chinna" Smith (born 1955), Jamaican guitarist
