= China (disambiguation) =

China, officially the People's Republic of China, is a country in East Asia.

China may also refer to:

== Geographic and cultural regions, polities, and concepts ==
- "China", a broader concept referring to the cultural region and nation with Chinese civilization (disambiguation)
- Greater China, a geographical region encompassing mainland China, Hong Kong, Macau, and Taiwan
- Mainland China, the geopolitical area directly controlled by the People's Republic of China, excluding Hong Kong and Macau
- Republic of China, now more commonly known as Taiwan
  - Republic of China (1912–1949), the sovereign state based in mainland China prior to its government's relocation to Taiwan
- One China, assertion that there is only one de jure Chinese sovereign state
- Two Chinas, describing the fact that the above two countries named with "China" exist

== Places ==
=== United States ===
- China, Indiana, an unincorporated community
- China, Maine, a town
- China Township, Michigan, a township
- China, Missouri, an unincorporated community
- China, New York, a hamlet
- China, Texas, a city
- China Grove, Texas, a town
- China Spring, Texas, an unincorporated community

=== Elsewhere ===
- China, Kagoshima, a town in Japan
- China, Nuevo León, a municipality in Mexico
- China, Pakistan, a village
- China Beach (British Columbia), a beach on Vancouver Island, Canada

== Film and television ==
- China (film), 1943, by John Farrow
- "China" (The Office), an episode of The Office
- China, IL, a show on Adult Swim

== Music ==
- China (band), a hard rock band from Switzerland
  - China (China album)
- China (Vangelis album) (1979)
- China (The Parlotones album) (2018)
- "China" (Anuel AA song)
- "China" (Red Rockers song)
- "China" (Tori Amos song)
- China cymbal, a type of accent cymbal
- China Records, a record label

== People ==
=== Football ===
- China (footballer, born 1923), born José Gonçalves da Silva, Brazilian football forward
- China (footballer, born 1939) born José Ricardo da Silva, Brazilian striker
- China (footballer, born 1948), born Ademir Ueta, Brazilian football forward
- China (footballer, born 1959) born Henrique Valmir da Conceição, Brazilian defensive midfielder
- China (footballer, born 1964) born Carlos Alberto Gomes Kao Yien, Brazilian rightback
- China (footballer, born 1980) born Leonardo Bruno dos Santos Silva, Brazilian rightback
- China (footballer, born 1982) born João Pedro dos Santos Gonçalves, Portuguese leftback
- China (footballer, born 1996), born Rogerio Alves dos Santos, Brazilian football striker
- China (footballer, born 1998), born Weyderson Denilson dos Santos Xavier, Brazilian football rightwinger

=== Other people with the name ===
- Edd China (born 1971), British motor specialist
- William Edward China, British entomologist (heteropterist)
- China Chow (born 1974), English actress
- China Kantner (born 1971), American actress
- China Keitetsi (born 1976), Ugandan activist
- China Machado (1929–2016), fashion model and editor
- China Anne McClain (born 1998), American actress and singer
- China Miéville (born 1972), British writer
- China Moses (born 1978), American singer and television host living in Paris
- China Zorrilla (1922–2014), Uruguayan actress
- China P. Arnold (born 1980), American convicted killer

== Other uses ==
- China (insect), a genus of grasshopper
- China (material) or porcelain
- China (schooner), destroyed in 1883
- China (Superleague Formula team), a national racing team from China
- 1125 China, an asteroid
- HMS Africa, launched 1862, renamed China in the Lay-Osborn Flotilla
- HMHS China, a British hospital ship in World War I
- Smilax china, a plant species
- Chinas, a people mentioned in ancient Indian literature

== See also ==
- China Lake (disambiguation)
- Chinatown, sometimes referred to as "Little China"
- Republic of China (disambiguation)
- Chinese (disambiguation)
- Chinna (disambiguation)
- Cochinchina, a region in modern Vietnam
- Indochina, a peninsula in Southeast Asia
- Chyna (name), given name and surname, including a list of people with the name
- Cina, a former kingdom absorbed by Luwu in Indonesia
