= China doll (disambiguation) =

A china doll is a doll made of glazed porcelain.

China doll or China Doll may also refer to:

== Literature ==
- China Doll (play), a 2015 play by David Mamet
- China Dolls (novel), a 2014 novel by Lisa See
- The China Doll, a 1964 novel

== Music ==
- "China Doll" (Slim Whitman song), 1952
- "China Doll" (Julian Cope song), 1988
- "China Doll", a song by the Grateful Dead from the album From the Mars Hotel
- China Doll (band), a British pop duo
- China Dolls, a Thai pop duo

== Other uses ==
- A stereotype of East and Southeast Asians in the United States reflecting hypersexuality and submissiveness
- In human trafficking in Malaysia, the nickname of female Chinese nationals
- Radermachera sinica, an evergreen tree native to China and Taiwan
- China Doll (brand), an Alabama-based brand of rice and beans
- China Doll (film), a 1957 film starring Victor Mature
- "China Doll" (Magnum, P.I.), a television episode
- China Doll, a Marvel Comics character and member of Technet

== See also ==
- China (disambiguation)
- Chyna Doll (disambiguation)
