= Government House, Bermuda =

Official residence of the Governor of Bermuda

Government House
- Location within Bermuda

General information
- Type: Official residence
- Architectural style: Italianate
- Location: Langton Hill, Hamilton, Pembroke, Bermuda
- Coordinates: 32°18′13.18″N 64°46′56.90″W
- Current tenants: Governor of Bermuda
- Completed: 1892
- Owner: Government of Bermuda

Design and construction
- Architect: William Cardy Hallet

Government House is the official residence of the governor of Bermuda. It is located on Langton Hill, overlooking the North Shore in Hamilton, Pembroke. Government House is also the official residence of the Bermudian head of state (currently King Charles III) when staying in Bermuda.

== History, architecture and grounds ==
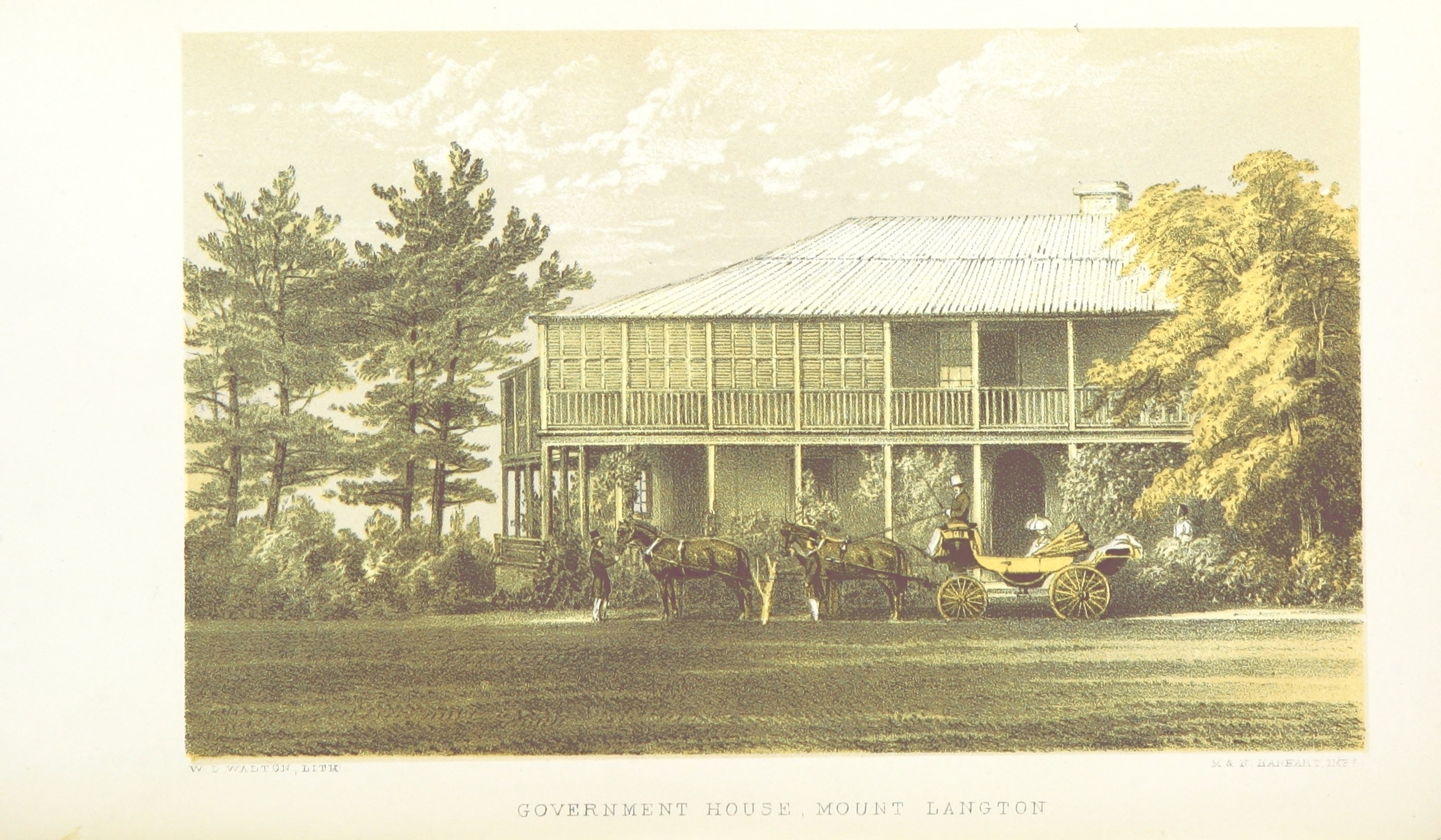
Former Government House, Mount Langton, 1857

Built in the Italianate style, Government House was designed by architect William Cardy Hallet and built in 1892. It replaced an earlier residence called "Mount Langton" (after a Scottish estate belonging to Sir James Cockburn, 9th Baronet, of Langton, Berwickshire, Governor of Bermuda from 1811 to 1812, from 1814 to 1816 and from 1817 to 1819) which had served as Government House from 1815 when the seat of government was moved from St. George's. Built with stone imported from France, it is a landmark which is visible from the road or water with its off-white stone towers and arches. The house's grounds consist of 33 acres (130,000 m^{2}), making them one of the largest open spaces left in Bermuda.

Government House has more than 30 rooms, including a large drawing room and dining room for formal entertaining, both of which open onto a long enclosed glass sun terrace overlooking the pool and garden. All the paintings are of Bermuda images, and the theme continues upstairs through the corridors and upstairs in The Royal Suite, and the private quarters of the governor which overlook the North Shore towards Hamilton Harbour, and the four guest bedrooms whose verandah offers views of Hamilton. Some of the artwork is part of the Government Collection, the rest is on loan from Masterworks Foundation and local artists and these are always changing.

Outside the main entrance to the house are three cannons, which have been in their present position since 1919. On either side of the cannons are two Washingtonia filifera (Petticoat Palms) planted by Queen Elizabeth II and Prince Philip, Duke of Edinburgh, in February 1975. From the terrace opposite there used to be steps down into the garden; it was close to these that on the night of March 10, 1973, the then governor Sir Richard Sharples was murdered, together with his aide-de-camp, Captain Hugh Sayers, and his dog.

To the left are the West Gates and on the terrace is a Podocarpus macrophyllus (Japanese yew tree), planted by Governor Sir Alexander Hood and Lady Hood to commemorate the coronation of Queen Elizabeth II. On the next terrace there is a Juniperus bermudiana (Bermuda cedar) planted by Winston Churchill in 1942 after his visit to the United States to meet President Franklin Roosevelt and address a joint session of the United States Congress. On the same level there is a Dictyosperma (princess palm) planted in 1963 by Emperor Haile Selassie I of Ethiopia, a Roystonea regia (royal palm) planted by Princess Margaret in 1975 and a Thrinax parviflora (thatch palm) planted by Margaret Thatcher in 1981. On the terrace below, on either side of the path, are a pair of Syagrus romanzoffiana (queen palms) planted by Queen Elizabeth II and Prince Philip in 1994. Near to the next flight of steps is another Podocarpus macrophyllus planted by Queen Elizabeth II in November 1953.

Down the steps there is an avenue of Bermuda cedars, the first on the left planted by Sir Edward Richards, the first black Bermudian to head the government of the Island. Two others bear the names of Princess Alexandra and Princess Margaret. Just to the left of the bottom of the path there is a royal poinciana planted by the Duke of Windsor on in 1940, and 25 yards (23 m) back towards the house a royal palm planted by Prince George, Duke of Kent, in 1928.

Across the lawn towards the garage and outbuildings or Government House takes is a Delonix regia planted by Charles, Prince of Wales, in 1970. Behind is the old drive lined with Phoenix canariensis (Canary Island date palms). Sloping down to the right are woodlands with a paddock and a meadow. Beyond the site of the old house, the flat area to the right of the cottage, there is a semi circular area of grass on which stands a Mangifera indica (mango tree) planted by Prince George, later King George V, and Bermuda's first Hevea brasiliensis (rubber tree), planted by Governor Lt. Colonel William Reid in 1840. On either side of the cutting leading to the entrance to the grounds are evergreen shrubs, and large bougainvillea vines over 100 years old cover the 30-foot (9.1 m) walls.

Opposite the cottage there is a flight of steps leading down into the Marsh Folly Gardens. In this sheltered and well-wooded area there some of the oldest white cedars on the island. On the other side of the road is a rock garden. Back towards the terrace is a collection of Arecaceae (palms) planted by British prime ministers and US presidents: John Major (1991), George H. W. Bush (1990 and 1991), Margaret Thatcher (1990), Harold Macmillan (1961), Edward Heath (1972) and Richard Nixon (late 1960s).

The 1925 American silent drama film The Little French Girl was filmed in Bermuda, where some scenes were filmed at Government House (the Governor and Commander-in-Chief at the time being General Sir Joseph John Asser.

As the largest open green area in Pembroke Parish, it has every endemic and native species of vegetation that existed before the colonisation of Bermuda. These are crucial to ward off erosion and wind damage from hurricanes. The grounds of Government House were severely damaged by Hurricane Fabian on September 5, 2004, and there is underway a long-term programme of clear-up, re-landscaping and planting. Five gardeners from the Parks Department of the Bermuda government maintain the grounds.

== Government House today ==
Government House is used for national and ceremonial functions, as well as receptions and meetings with foreign dignitaries and heads of state. As well as being the official residence of the governor's family, it is also a working office employing executive, secretarial and domestic staff for the governor and the deputy governor (who resides elsewhere).

Although the governor is King Charles III's representative, appointed by the British government, the upkeep of Government House (and the governor's own salary, staff and other expenses) is the responsibility of the Government of Bermuda.

In 2024 the building was deemed uninhabitable due to deterioration caused by water ingress and vacated pending major repair works.

== See also ==
- Governor of Bermuda
- Government Houses of the British Empire and Commonwealth
