= James Willcocks =

British general (1857–1926)

General Sir James Willcocks GCB GCMG KCSI DSO
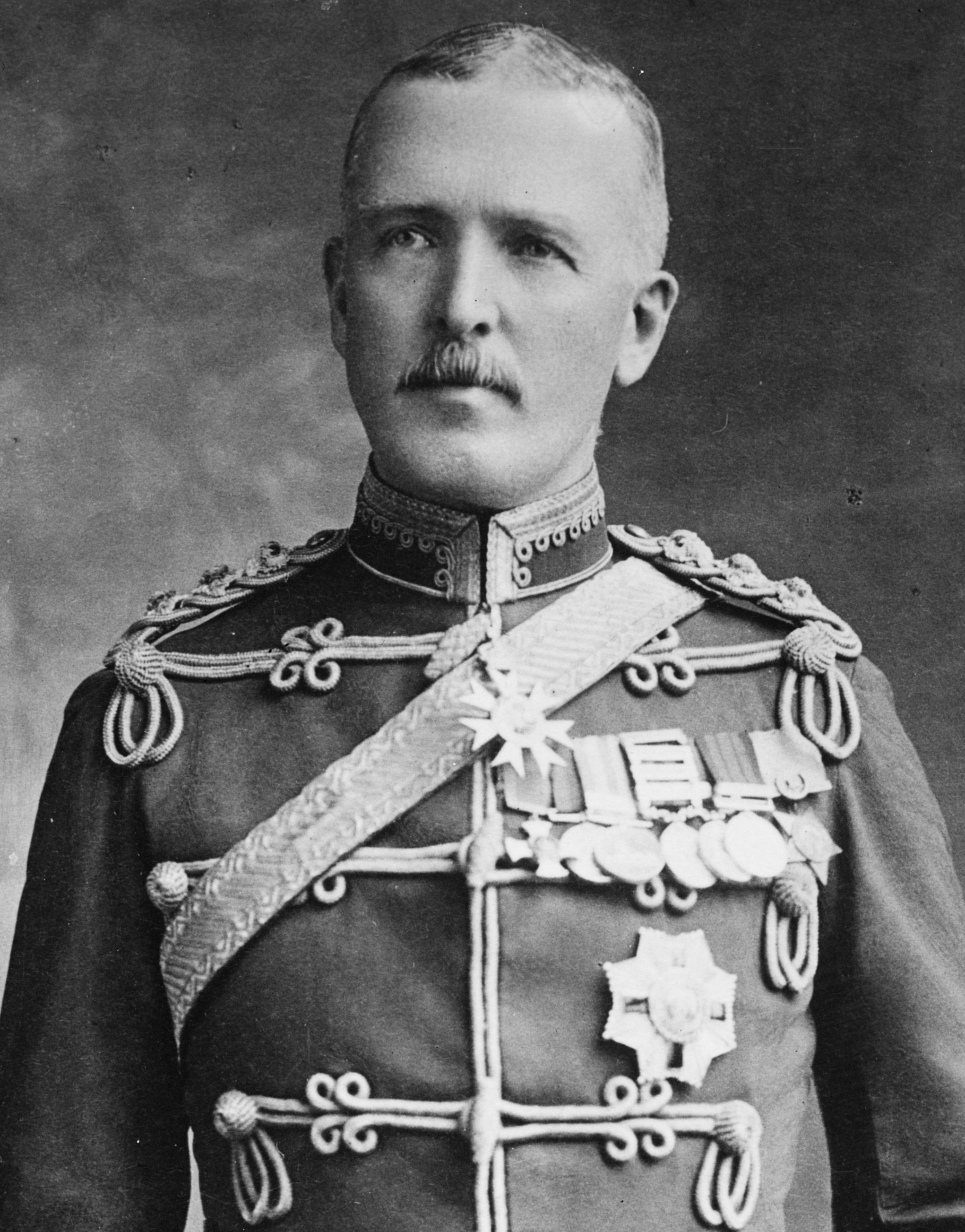

Governor of and General Officer Commanding Bermuda
- In office May 1917 – 1922

General Officer Commanding, Indian Corps
- In office 1914 – September 1915

General Officer Commanding, Northern Army, India
- In office October 1910 – 1914

Commander, Peshawar Division
- In office 1908–1910

Commander, Nowshera Brigade
- In office 1906–1907

Commander, Belgaum District
- In office February 1902 – 1906

Colonel-Commandant, West African Frontier Force
- In office 1 January 1900 – January 1902

Personal details
- Born: 1 April 1857 Baraut, India
- Died: 18 December 1926 (aged 69) Bharatpur, India
- Awards: Knight Grand Cross of the Order of the Bath; Knight Grand Cross of the Order of St Michael and St George; Knight Commander of the Order of the Star of India; Distinguished Service Order

Military service
- Allegiance: United Kingdom
- Branch/service: British Army
- Years of service: 1878–1922
- Rank: General
- Commands: Indian Corps; Northern Army, India; Belgaum district West African Frontier Force
- Battles/wars: War of the Golden Stool; Second Afghan War; Second Boer War; Bazar Valley campaign First World War

General Sir James Willcocks, GCB, GCMG, KCSI, DSO (1 April 1857 – 18 December 1926) was a British Army officer who spent most of his career in India and Africa and held high command during the First World War.

== Early life and education ==
Willcocks was born in Baraut, Meerut District, British India, the son of an officer in the East India Company's army. He was educated in England and passed out from the Royal Military College, Sandhurst, in January 1878 (having only got in on the third attempt), being commissioned into the 100th Foot then stationed in the Punjab in India.

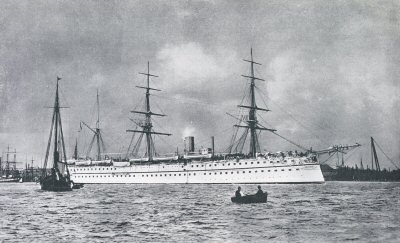
HMS Malabar, the troopship aboard which Willcocks returned to India as a subaltern

== Military career as a company and field officer ==
In late 1879, shortly after being promoted lieutenant, Willcocks persuaded his superiors to send him to the Second Afghan War (although his regiment was not engaged there), where he served as a transport officer. In 1881 he again served as a transport officer in the Mahsud Waziri expedition, rejoining his regiment the following year. In 1884 he was seconded to the newly formed Army Transport Department and posted to Assam. He was promoted captain in what was by now the Prince of Wales's Leinster Regiment in August 1884. He served in the Sudan in 1885–1886 and then returned to Assam before serving in Burma in 1886, for which he was awarded the Distinguished Service Order (DSO). In December 1887 he was offered a permanent transfer to the Commissariat and Transport Department, but declined in favour of the adjutantcy of the 1st Battalion of his regiment.

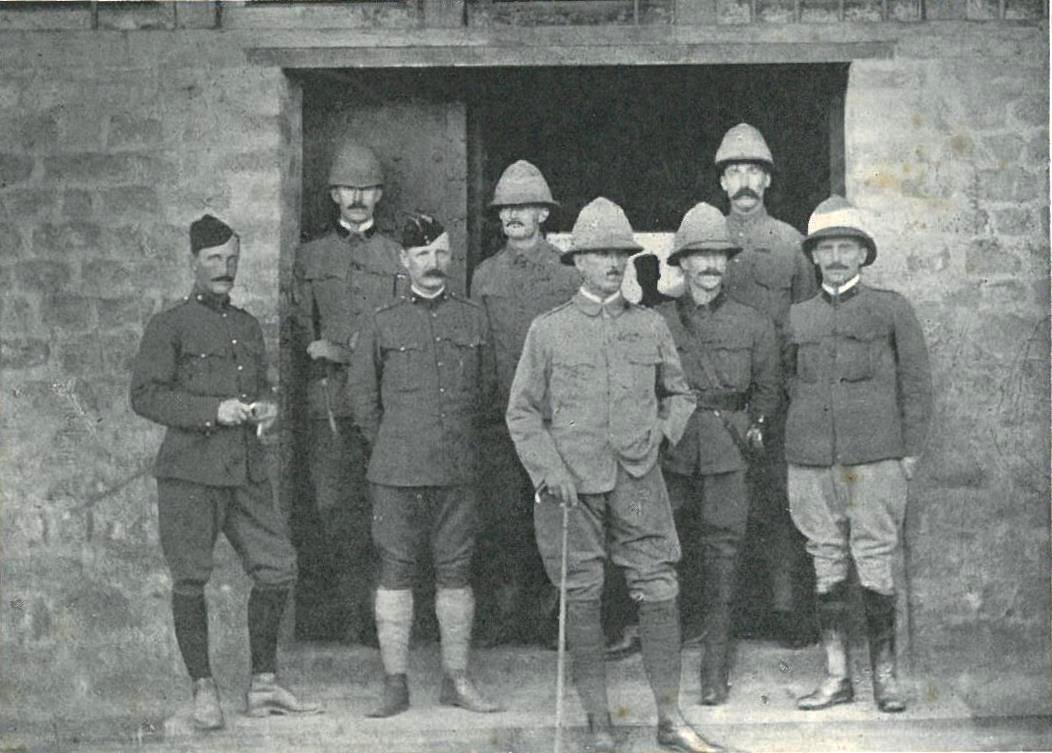
General Sir James Willcocks, K.C.M.G., D.S.O., and staff, at the entrance to the fort at Kumasi

In 1889 Willcocks served as an intelligence officer in the Chin-Lushai expedition and in 1891 in the Manipur expedition. In June 1897 he was appointed assistant adjutant-general of the Baluchistan field force, and in November 1897 second-in-command of the new West African Frontier Force as a temporary lieutenant-colonel, under the command of Frederick Lugard. He was appointed Companion of the Order of St Michael and St George (CMG) in the 1899 New Year Honours. In July 1899, while on half-pay, he was promoted substantive lieutenant-colonel (having received his brevet in May 1898). On the 23 September 1899 Willcocks is recorded as being aboard the British and African Steam Navigation Company Royal Mail ship SS Bornu, embarking from Liverpool with the destination being Forçados. He was accompanied aboard ship by a number of officers who took part in the War of the Golden Stool.

Colonel Lugard became High Commissioner following the proclamation of the new Protectorate of Northern Nigeria on 1 January 1900, and Willcocks succeeded him as colonel-commandant of the Frontier Force, being granted the local rank of colonel on the same day. For his relief of Kumasi during the Ashanti War of 1900, Willcocks was appointed Knight Commander of the Order of St Michael and St George (KCMG) and promoted to brevet colonel.

== Military career as a general officer ==
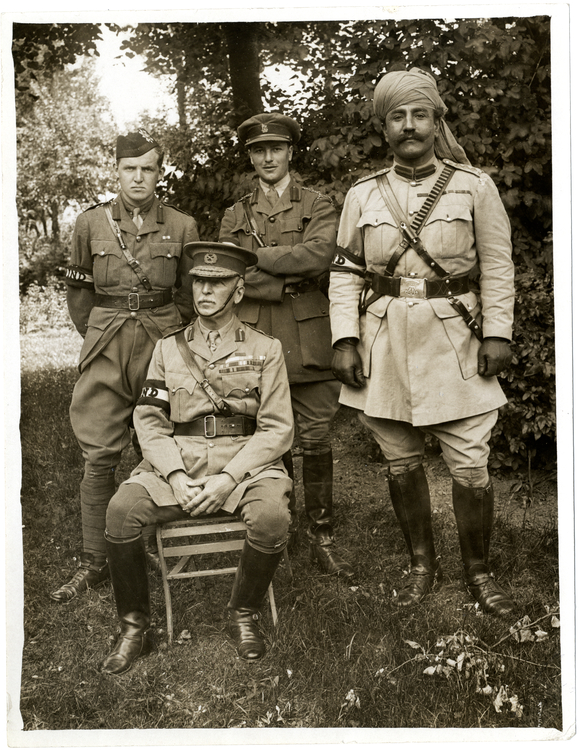
General Sir James Willcocks and his personal staff in July 1915

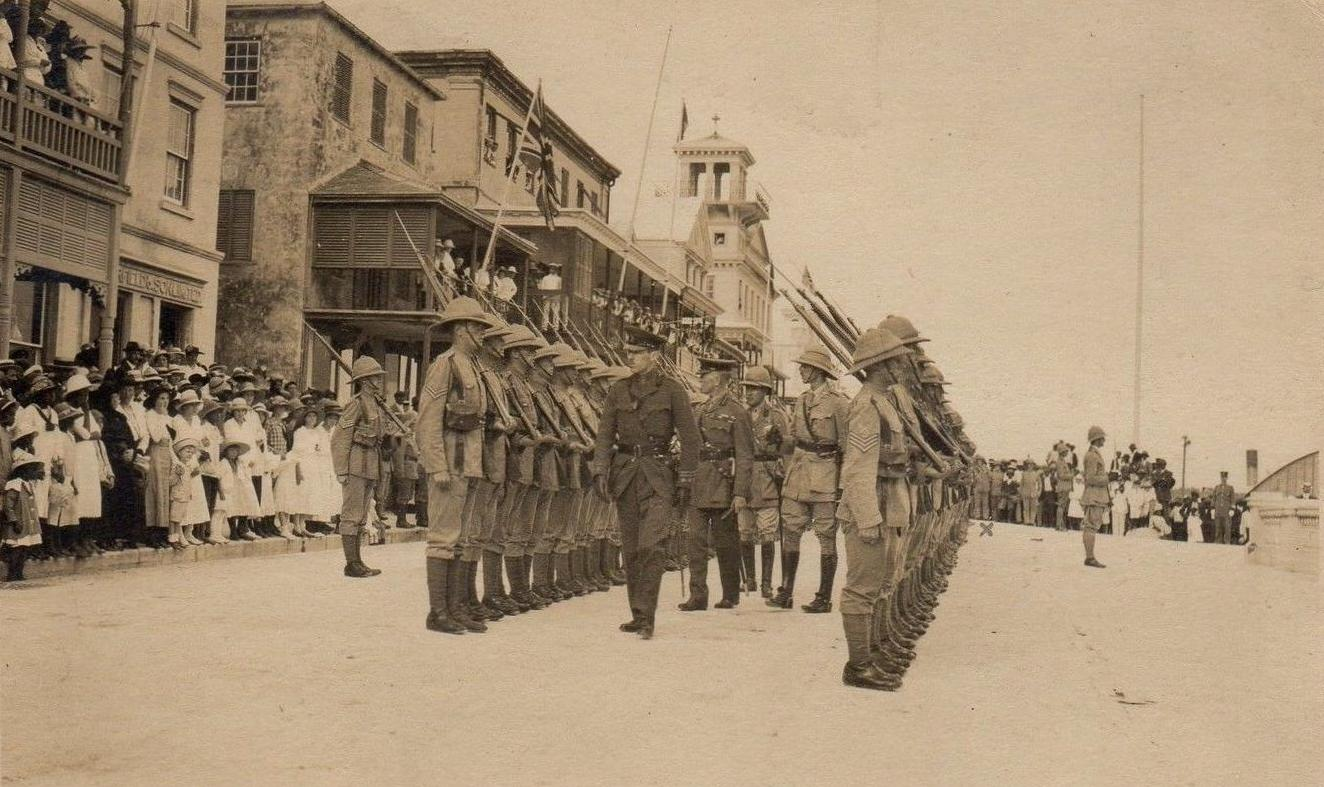
2/4 Bn East Yorkshire Regiment and General Sir James Willcocks in Hamilton, Bermuda in 1917

In early January 1902, Willcocks received orders to go to South Africa, and issued a statement to say how welcome he found this order, as he had never before been unemployed. He was graded as a colonel on the staff while employed on special service in South Africa.

After serving only a couple of weeks in the late stages of the Second Boer War, Willcocks was transferred to India in late February, to assume command of the Belgaum district. He was promoted to the substantive rank of colonel on 29 March 1902, on the day he took up command with the temporary rank of brigadier general while so employed. He was promoted major general in December 1906, and given command of a brigade and was appointed Companion of the Order of the Bath (CB) in the 1907 Birthday Honours. He was promoted to command the Peshawar Division in January 1908 and commanded the Bazar Valley Field Force against the Zakka Khel clan of the Afridi in February and March 1908, and promoted lieutenant general for distinguished service in the field following his command of the Mohmand Field Force in July 1908. In October 1910, he was appointed to the command of the Northern Army. In the 1913 New Year Honours he was appointed Knight Commander of the Order of the Star of India (KCSI). He was appointed Knight Commander of the Order of the Bath (KCB) in 1914.

In 1914 Willcocks was given command of the Indian Corps in France. He was appointed Knight Grand Cross of the Order of St Michael and St George (GCMG) in the 1915 Birthday Honours, and was promoted general in May 1915, but resigned in September 1915 after friction with General Sir Douglas Haig, who commanded the First Army of the British Expeditionary Force (BEF).

Willcocks was given the colonelcy of the Loyal Regiment (North Lancashire) from April 1916 until his death.

== Governor of Bermuda and General Officer Commanding-in-Chief Bermuda, retirement and death ==
In May 1917, Willcocks was appointed Governor and General Officer Commanding-in-Chief the Imperial fortress of Bermuda (where a large Bermuda Garrison protected the Royal Naval Dockyard and other strategic assets), being sworn in by the Chief Justice of Bermuda at the entrance to the Council Chambers in Hamilton on 2 June 1917.

Serving under Willcocks in Bermuda as General Staff Officer, 2nd Grade, was his son, Major James Lugard Willcocks, DSO, MC (1893–1963) of the Black Watch. His granddaughter (the daughter of James Lugard Willcocks and his wife, Muriel Kathleen Price, the daughter of the late Colonel Gordon Price, I.M.S.), Wendy Winifred Willcocks, was born at Bermuda on 15 November 1919.

The depot ship at the Royal Naval Dockyard Bermuda at the time was the old troopship HMS Malabar, which had been assigned to that role in 1897 and was renamed HMS Terror (the name of her predecessor as depot ship) in 1901. She was placed on the sale list in 1914 and was sold in 1918. She was the first ship Willcocks saw at Bermuda when he arrived in 1917. Shortly after visiting her alongside the wharf at Front Street in the city of Hamilton, he wrote a letter for the Royal Gazette newspaper (dated 3 September 1918 and published on the front page on 7 September 1918) in which he fondly recalled his passage to India aboard her when he was a subaltern at the start of his career as a military officer. Willcocks also memorably was carried aloft in the first flight over Bermuda (by a Burgess-built Curtiss N-9H Jenny floatplane (A2646) of the United States Navy from the former USS Elinor) on 22 May 1919 (strictly the second flight: US Navy Ensigns G. L. Richard and W. H. Cushing flew the seaplane from Murray's Anchorage to Hamilton Harbour, where they set down to collect Willcocks, who took Cushing's place in the two-seater). Willcocks dropped a message of goodwill to the people of Bermuda, which was Bermuda's first air mail. Willcocks was also a passenger in the first descent by a submarine in local waters. He was the life patron of the Bermuda War Veterans Society.

He served in these posts until 1922. He was appointed Knight Grand Cross of the Order of the Bath (GCB) in the 1921 Birthday Honours. He authored his memoirs The Romance of Soldiering and Sport, which was published in 1925. He later returned to India and died at Bharatpur in 1926.

== Personal life ==
Willcocks married Winifred Way, the second daughter of Colonel George Augustus Way, CB, BSC, on 29 July 1889, at Calcutta. James Lugard Willcocks, born 5 January 1893, in Delhi, was their only child.

== Death ==
Willcocks died at Moti Hahal Palace, Bharatpur, Rajputana, India, on 18 December 1926. News of his death was received at Bermuda on 21 December. A ball scheduled to take place that evening at Government House was postponed until 23 December. The Legislative council was sitting, but limited business to one matter other than sending a letter to the Governor asking that the council's sympathies be expressed to Lady Willcocks. The House of Assembly of Bermuda also sent a message to the Governor, on the motion of Major Thomas Melville Dill, MCP, asking that the profound regret of the Legislature and people of Bermuda and an expression of sympathy be sent to Lady Willcocks by the Secretary of State for the Colonies. General Willcocks' final message to Bermuda was printed in the Royal Gazette on 29 December 1926.

Camp, foot of Himalayas,

India,
21st November, 1926.

The Editor,
"Royal Gazette."

Very Happy Xmas and New Year to all in Bermuda-It was with genuine grief I read of the fearful hurricane, which lately passed over your beautiful islands and the great loss of life in His Majesty's Navy.

I wired to the War Veterans for their gathering on 11th November and I mean one day to again visit Bermuda and meet such old friends as may still remember me.

God bless you all,
JAMES WILLCOCKS,

General.

== Footnotes ==
Military offices
Preceded by Sir Josceline Wodehouse	GOC-in-C, Northern Army, India; 1910–1914	Succeeded by Sir Robert Scallon
Preceded by Sir George Bullock	GOC-in-C Bermuda; 1917–1922	Succeeded by Sir Joseph John Asser
Government offices
Preceded by Sir George Bullock	Governor of Bermuda; 1917–1922	Succeeded by Sir Joseph John Asser
