= The Little French Girl =

1925 film

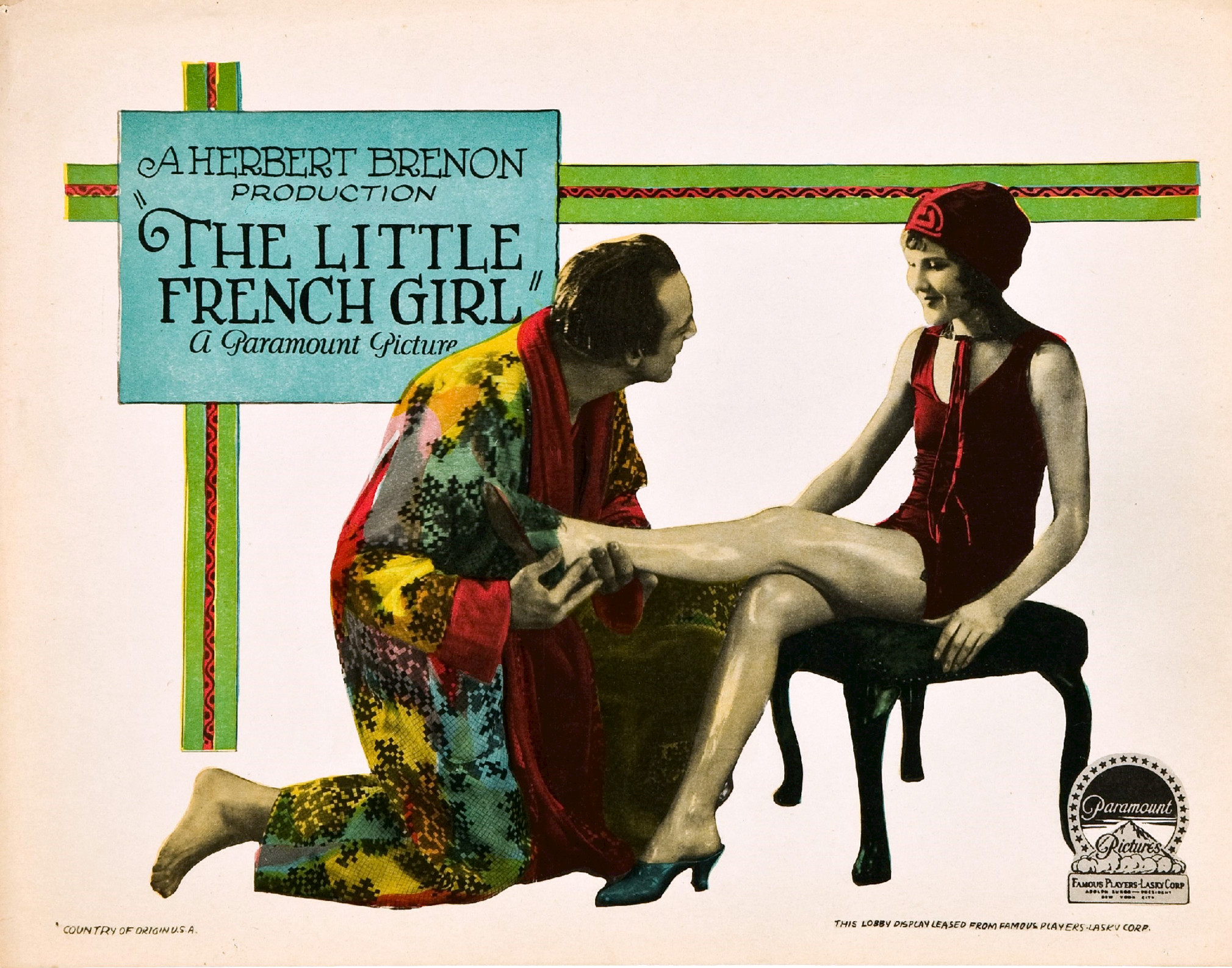
- Lobby card
- Directed by: Herbert Brenon
- Screenplay by: John Russell
- Based on: The Little French Girl by Anne Douglas Sedgwick
- Produced by: Jesse L. Lasky; Adolph Zukor
- Starring: Mary Brian; Maurice de Canonge; Paul Doucet; Maude Turner Gordon; Neil Hamilton; Julia Hurley; Jane Jennings
- Cinematography: Harold Rosson
- Production company: Famous Players–Lasky Corporation
- Distributed by: Paramount Pictures
- Release date: May 31, 1925
- Running time: 62 minutes
- Country: United States
- Language: Silent (English intertitles)

The Little French Girl is a 1925 American silent drama film directed by Herbert Brenon and written by John Russell and Anne Douglas Sedgwick from a 1924 novel by Sedgwick, and filmed in the British Imperial fortress colony of Bermuda, 640 miles off North Carolina, where some scenes were filmed at Government House, the official residence of the Governor and military Commander-in-Chief of Bermuda General Sir Joseph John Asser. The film stars Mary Brian, Maurice de Canonge, Paul Doucet, Maude Turner Gordon, Neil Hamilton, Julia Hurley, and Jane Jennings. The film was released on May 31, 1925, by Paramount Pictures.

== Plot ==
As described in a film magazine review, Madame Vervier, a sophisticated woman, sends her daughter Alix to live with Owen Bradley's parents in London. Madame is ashamed of the life she has led in Paris. Owen is in the midst of a flirtation with her despite his family's feelings and his having a fiancée. After Owen's death, Alix learns of the reputation her mother has, and tries to keep Toppie, Owen's fiancée, from joining a convent. Toppie is told of the affair between Owen and Madame, but she still wants to go to a convent. Giles, a friend of Toppie, goes from London to Paris seeking Alix, the "little French girl."

== Cast ==
- Mary Brian as Alix Vervier
- Maurice de Canonge as Jerry Hamble
- Paul Doucet as Andre Valenbois
- Maude Turner Gordon as Lady Mary Hamble
- Neil Hamilton as Giles Bradley
- Julia Hurley as Mme. Dumont
- Jane Jennings as Mother Bradley
- Anthony Jowitt as Owen Bradley
- Alice Joyce as Madame Vervier
- Mario Majeroni as DeMaubert
- Esther Ralston as Toppie Westmacott
- Mildred Ryan as Ruth Bradley
- Eleanor Shelton

== Preservation ==
With no prints of The Little French Girl located in any film archives, it is a lost film.

== See also ==
- The Little Irish Girl (1926) starring Dolores Costello
