= Chynna =

Chynna, Chyna, or Chynah can be both a given name and surname. Notable people with the name include:

- Chyna (1969–2016), American professional wrestler, actress, glamour model, and bodybuilder
- Chynna Clugston Flores (born 1975), American comic book creator
- Chynna Ortaleza (born 1982), Filipino actress, television host, and model
- Chyna Layne, American-born Jamaican actress
- Chyna Taylor (born 2009), American ice hockey player
- Chynna Phillips (born 1968), American singer and actor
- Chynna Rogers (1994–2020), American rapper and model
- Blac Chyna (born 1988), American model and entrepreneur
- Chynah Tyler (fl. 2017), American politician from Massachusetts

== See also ==
- China (disambiguation), includes a list of people with the name China
- Chyna Doll (disambiguation)
