= Beryl de Zoete =

English ballerina

Beryl Drusilla de Zoete, also known as Beryl de Sélincourt (July 1879 – 4 March 1962) was an English ballet dancer, orientalist, dance critic and dance researcher. She is also known as a translator of Italo Svevo and Alberto Moravia.

Born in London of Dutch descent, she lived there for most of her life. She studied English at Somerville College, Oxford. In 1902, a year after she graduated, she married Basil de Sélincourt, though the celibate marriage lasted for only a few years. She published poems in the modernist magazine The Open Window. She entered into a lifelong relationship with the Orientalist and translator Arthur Waley, whom she met in 1918 but never married. She traveled extensively, particularly in Bali and South Asia.

In the field of dance, she taught eurhythmics, investigated Indian dance and theatre traditions and collaborated with Walter Spies on Dance and Drama in Bali (1937), which is still a standard reference for traditional Balinese dance and theatrical forms. She studied dance, at least in part with Emile Jaques-Dalcroze in 1913 and 1915 and subsequently taught dance until sometime in the 1920s. She wrote on dance at various times for The Daily Telegraph, the New Statesman and Nation and Ballet (edited by Richard Buckle). She published books on dance in Bali (1938), India (1953) and Sri Lanka (1957).

According to Harold Acton, she had a tendency to overstretch the hospitality of her friends: when Paola Olivetti, a little vexed, went away from one of her villas, Beryl stayed on; she left only when the cook told her he was going on vacation.

Beryl makes an appearance in Anuradha Roy's novel All the Lives We Never Lived (2018), which combines a portrayal of her time in Bali with Walter Spies with a fictional trip to India that Spies had planned to take in order to research Indian dance forms.
