= Chinna (art director) =

Chinna a.k.a. Dharma Rao is an Indian film art director, working mostly in Telugu cinema. His debut film was Kalisi Naduddam. He also worked on Tamil films, such as Roja Malare.

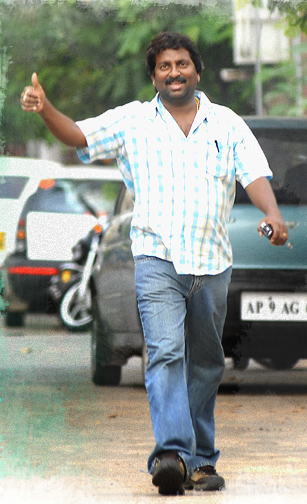

== Partial filmography ==
- Kalisi Naduddam (2001)
- Vechivunta (2001)
- Anandam (2001)
- Aaduthu Paaduthu (2002)
- Pellam Oorelithe (2003)
- Amma Nanna O Tamila Ammayi (2003)
- Taarak (2003)
- Sivamani (2003)
- Thoda Tum Badlo Thoda Hum (2004)
- Andhrawala (2004)
- Shart: The Challenge (2004)
- 143 (2004)
- Intlo Srimathi Veedhilo Kumari (2004)
- Super (2005)
- Lakshmi Songs (2006)
- Happy (2006)
- Pokiri (2006)
- Hello Premistara (2007)
- Yogi (2007)
- Chirutha (2007)
- Desamuduru (2007)
- Bujjigadu: Made in Chennai (2008)
- Chintakayala Ravi (2008)
- Neninthe (2008)
- Konchem Ishtam Konchem Kashtam (2009)
- Wanted Hindi (2009)
- Ride (2009)
- Anjaneyulu (2009)
- Bumper Offer (2009)
- Ek Niranjan (2009)
- Arya 2 (2009)
- Golimar (2010)
- Nagavalli (2010)
- Nenu Naa Rakshasi (2011)
- Adhinayakudu (2012)
- Kandireega (2011)
- Businessman (2012)
- Cameraman Gangatho Rambabu (2012)
- Devudu Chesina Manushulu (2012)
- Manushulatho Jagratha (2013)
- Traffic (2013)
- Anamika (2014)
