= Basil de Sélincourt =

British essayist and journalist

- Born: 19 August 1876; Wandsworth, England
- Died: 16 February 1966 (aged 89); Moreton-in-Marsh, Gloucestershire, England
- Occupations: Essayist, journalist
- Spouses: Beryl de Zoete; Anne Douglas Sedgwick; Julia Sanford Chapin

Basil de Sélincourt (19 August 1876 – 16 February 1966) was a British essayist and journalist.

In 1900, de Sélincourt was an Acting Professor of Greek at the University of Sydney and from 1900-1901 served as President of the Sydney University Union (now the University of Sydney Union).

In 1902 he married the orientalist Beryl de Zoete, but the celibate marriage failed, and in 1908 he married the writer Anne Douglas Sedgwick (1873–1935). Basil de Sélincourt's third wife was Julia Sanford Chapin.

De Sélincourt died in Moreton-in-Marsh, Gloucestershire in February 1966.

== Works ==
- Giotto (1905)
- William Blake (1909)
- Walt Whitman A Critical Study (1914)
- The English Secret and Other Essays (1923)
- The Religion of the Spirit (1927)
- Selected Poems of William Blake (1927) editor
- Pomona or the Future of English (1928)
- Towards Peace and Other Essays Critical or Constructive (1932)
- Enjoyment of Music (Hogarth Press)
- Anne Douglas Sedgwick: A Portrait in Letters (1936)
