= Bazar Valley campaign =

1908 punitive expedition in NW Frontier Province, British India

- Part of Instability on the North-West Frontier
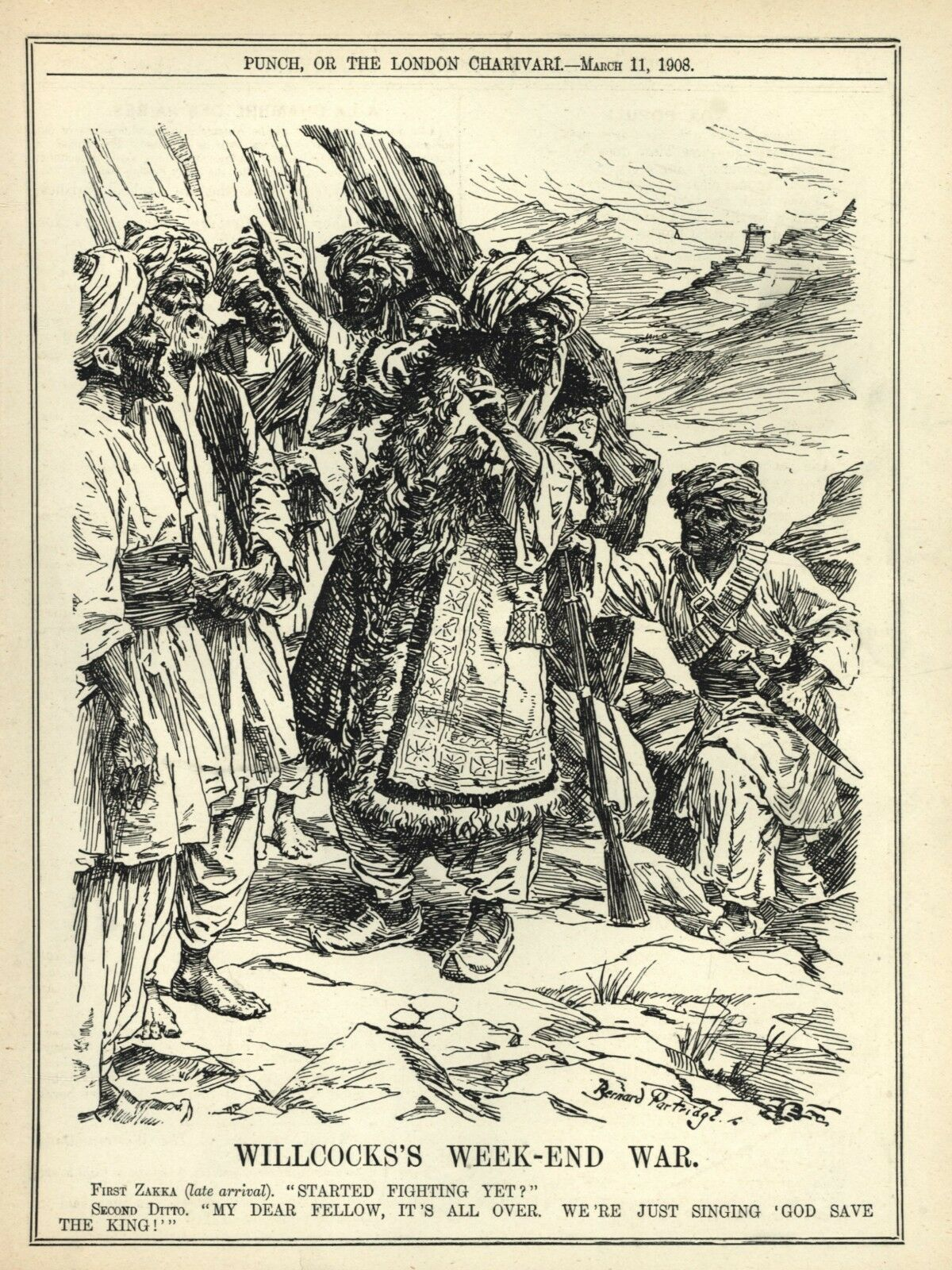
- Punch Magazine cartoon - "Wilcock's Weekend War"
Date	12 February – 2 March 1908 (Official dates)
Location	Bazar Valley
Result	Jirga and peace

Belligerents
(United Kingdom) Britain: British Raj	Zakka Khel clan of the Afridi

Commanders and leaders
Archibald Wavell; James Willcocks	Dadai (WIA); Multan; Gul Baz; Muhammad Afzal Ziauddin; Usman Khusrogi

Strength
Unknown	6,000 (British estimate)

Casualties and losses
Officers: 1 killed, 4 wounded Others: 2 killed, 33 wounded	70 or more killed, 70 or more wounded

The Bazar Valley campaign of 1908 was a punitive expedition against the Zakka Khel clan of the Afridi, a Pakhtun tribe inhabiting the mountains on the Peshawar border of the North West Frontier province of British India.

It was undertaken by the Bazar Valley Field Force, under the command of General Sir James Willcocks. The campaign began on 12 February 1908, and was concluded by a jirga and peace in March 1908. The satirical magazine Punch characterised the campaign as Willcocks' Weekend War. The main British Army elements were the Seaforth Highlanders and the 37th Lancers. Regiments of the British Indian Army included sections of the 45th and 53rd Sikhs, the Madras Sappers and 5 Gorkha Rifles. Archibald Percival, 1st Earl Wavell took part in this campaign as a junior officer.

== Background ==
=== Situation on the North West Frontier (1897–1907) ===
In the Tirah campaign of 1897-98 the forces of the British Government had effectively dispelled the cloud of mystery that had been spread over Tirah for many centuries. The country had been explored from end to end. The Afridi tribes had learnt at last, that their secluded villages and mountain fastnesses, nestling along the base of the Safed Koh, could no longer be regarded as inaccessible if the country were invaded by a determined and well-equipped force.

The settlement concluded at the end of the operations proved satisfactory to both parties. The lenient and liberal terms granted by the Government were appreciated by the tribesmen whose resources were temporarily exhausted from the effects of the invasion. Recruiting in the Indian Army and Frontier Militias became as brisk as ever.

It may confidently be asserted that the stability of the peace would have been more permanent, had it not been for the existence of certain sinister influences, which continually threatened to undermine the loyalty of the border tribesmen towards the British Government. The mullahs dwelling in tribal territory as well as in Afghanistan were, by reason of their fanatical inclinations, ever prone to stir up strife against a foreign Government, while the presence of an anti-British party in Kabul afforded a sure guarantee that disaffected tribesmen could obtain encouragement and support from that centre. In the year 1904 a large body of Afridis visited Kabul. They were well received and dismissed with substantial presents of cash; they were also permitted to purchase arms and ammunition. In consequence an unusually large number of rifles, mostly Martinis, and cartridges were imported into Tirah during that year. The reception accorded in 1904 to the Afridis who went to Kabul emboldened the tribes as a whole and the Zakka Khel in particular to adopt a contumacious attitude towards the British Government. On the night of 3 September 1904 a daring raid on the village of Darshi Khel near Bahadur Khel was made by a band of 15 Afridis (Zakka Khel and Kambar Khel) and two Orakzais. As a consequence of this raid the well disposed among the tribal maliks were induced to attempt the coercion of the offending section, but with no definite result. The maliks confessed that the tribesmen owing to the favour shown to them at Kabul had got beyond control. The stoppage of the whole of the allowances due to the Afridis for 1904 again induced the remainder of the tribes to take concerted action against the Zakka Khel. Their endeavors produced no lasting results, but it was recognized that they had done all that could be expected to coerce the recalcitrants, and early in 1905 the allowances of all except the Zakka Khel were paid.

During the years 1904, 1905, 1906 and 1907 the Zakka Khel maintained an attitude of open defiance to Government. Bands of the tribe so harried the borders of the Kohat and Peshawar districts that security of life and property was seriously menaced. The other Afridis behaved well in so far as they restrained members of their own clans from joining in these raids, but they confessed their inability to restrain the Zakka Khel and indeed recommended to Government the occupation of the Bazar Valley, as the only effective means of dealing with the situation.

In June 1907 the Zakka Khel on finding that there was no intention of calling in their jirga along with other Afridi sections to receive allowances, sent a jirga uninvited to Landi Kotal and announced that they had come to make peace with Government, to hear the charges against the section and to settle the cases. On being informed of the claims against them they said that they were absurd and could not be entertained. They were prepared to restore any stolen property which accused men might acknowledge to be in their possession, and to return three of the six rifles taken in a raid from the Pabbi Police Station. They said that the system of deducting fines from allowances must be stopped; that their oath must be accepted in all cases; that they would accept no responsibility for raiders passing through their country to and from British territory; that in no circumstances would they surrender offenders for punishment; and that all restrictions on members of the tribe going to Kabul, or receiving allowances from the Amir must be removed. Their attitude in short showed that they had no real desire to come to a settlement, and they returned to Bazar without matters being in any way advanced. However the uncompromising reception of this jirga had so excellent an effect that the borders enjoyed an immunity from their raids during the summer months. As time passed without the long expected punishment being inflicted, so the fear of punishment passed with it. In October raiding recommenced when the leaders, the chief of whom were Dadai, Usman and Multan, returned from a visit to Kabul.

=== Raids on British Indian towns (1907) ===
The Zakka Khel who visited Kabul had been favourably received bv Sardar Nasrulla Khan, those who were in receipt of annual allowances from the Amir were paid, many allowances were augmented and new ones granted. Every facility was again allowed to the tribesmen to purchase rifles, of which a large number were available from the Persian Gulf source of supply. In the mind of the Afridi the fact of receiving an allowance from the Afghan Government and joining the "Kabul party" is equivalent to pledging himself to unequivocal hostility to the British Government, so that the resumption of raiding on their return was a natural sequel to this visit to Kabul. Early in October five separate raiding gangs, whose numbers were augmented by outlaws from other tribes, were organised in the following manner:

Leader name	Tribe
Dadai	Anai Zakka Khel
Multan	Unknown
Gul Baz	Unknown
Muhammad Afzal Ziauddin	Zakka Khel
Usman Khusrogi	Zakka Khel

These set to work at once and offences, of which the following were the most important, now began to be reported with unceasing regularity.

==== 5 October 1907 ====
A gang of some 30 Zakka Khel under Dadai raided the village of Sumari in the Kohat district, killing one Muhammadan and carrying off two Hindus and property for the value of Rs. 600.

==== 28 October ====
A gang of 30 Afridis, mainly Zakka Khel, attacked Pabbi in the Peshawar district and seized five Hindus. They fired on a party of troops at the station seriously wounding a sepoy and a zamindar. At Tarnab they attacked and wounded the Revenue Assistant in camp and carried off his Chuprassi and horses. En route they robbed ten cartmen. Near Peshawar they encountered a party of police and fired on them, wounding two constables. Here they had to abandon most of their heavy booty and retreated into tribal territory.

==== 13 November ====
The village of Lachi in the Kohat district was attacked by 22 men, mainly Zakka Khel. The Post Office was looted and one villager killed and three wounded. The raiders met a party of Border Military Police and fired on them, killing two and wounding two others. They carried off four rifles, jewels and other property.

==== 20 November ====
A similar gang under Dadai fired on a village near the Bara Fort. The garrison of Border Military Police turned out and were at once attacked, two men being killed and two wounded at the first discharge.

==== 24 November ====
A large gang of Zakka Khel attacked the Marai village in Kohat, but were driven off by the troops and villagers with a loss of two men killed and three wounded, all Zakka Khel. One of the men killed was Rokhan, Karigar, Khusrogi, a well-known raider of the Dadai faction.

==== 25 November ====
Multan, with some 35 Zakka Khel, carried off 400 goats from Matanni and attacked a police post, where they were repulsed.

==== 5 December ====
The village of Masho Khel in the Peshawar district was attacked and a bania's shop looted and the owner killed by a gang of 16 persons, mainly Zakka Khel, and on the same day 12 mules working on the Khaibar Road near Jamrud were carried off to Bazar by the Zakka Khel.

=== Attempts to avoid armed conflict (January 1908) ===
These raids were not mere border affairs such as might reasonably, in the circumstances of the frontier, be passed over without serious notice. Many of them, and those the most important, were organised raids by large and well armed bodies of men on peaceful villages far in the interior of British administered districts, or direct attacks upon Government posts and property. It was evident by this time that those hostile acts of the Zakka Khel had now rendered military operations indispensable. In a dispatch, dated 9 January 1908, to the Secretary of State for India, the Government proposed that, before having recourse to punitive methods themselves, in order to exhaust every possible alternative, Sir H. Deane, the Chief Commissioner and Agent to the Governor General in the North-West Frontier Province, should call in a jirga of the Afridi clans and announce to them that unless they put an end to the present state of affairs created by the Zakka Khel, the Government had decided to punish this section at once.

This action, it was pointed out, might obviate the necessity for taking punitive methods themselves, and at the same time if the Afridis expressed their inability or unwillingness to coerce the Zakka Khel it would be tantamount to a public admission of the British Indian authorities' right to adopt coercive measures themselves and would deprive them of any excuse for joining the Zakka Khel. The attitude of the Afridis at this time showed no disposition on the part of other sections to identify themselves with the Zakka Khel and there was little reason to anticipate that they would join in opposing the British advance into Bazar.

In the same despatch (9 January 1908), it was explained that a punitive expedition on the old lines was not contemplated, but that the action proposed included the following measures:

- The recovery of a fine and the disarmament of the section.
- The capture and trial of the ringleaders and those implicated in the recent raids.
- The construction of a road which would in the future contain this section and prevent their escape into the inaccessible regions to which they now resort. The road would be maintained on lines similar to those prevailing with regard to the Khaibar, so far as they are applicable.
- The actual offenders in the recent raids and their supporters, if captured, would be dealt with by suitable tribunals locally assembled.

Stress was laid on the desirability of the movement on the Bazar Valley being made suddenly, and it was therefore requested that preparations might be made, so that no time should be lost between Sir H. Deane's announcement to the Afridi jirga and the advance of the force, should this course be found necessary after his interview with the jirga. Before an answer to this dispatch was received the Zakka Khel perpetrated two most daring raids.

On the night of 24 January some 30 raiders attacked the Kacha Garhi Railway Station between Peshawar and Jamrud, with the object of luring out the Border Military Police garrison and then attacking them. In this they were unsuccessful.

On the night of 28 January another raid was undertaken. A gang of 60 to 80 men raided Peshawar City, killing one policeman, and wounding two others and two chowkidars. Property said to be worth one lakh of rupees was carried away. The Khaibar rifles spent 15 hours trying to cut them off, but owing to a telephone being out of order they were informed too late and the raiders got clear away. The situation was now so acute that immediate action was necessary.

=== British authorities prepare for armed conflict (January–February 1908) ===
On 31 January the Viceroy, in a telegram to the Secretary of State pointed out that it was expedient to vindicate the British authority without delay. He considered that it was no longer possible to influence the position by the assistance of the jirga. as suggested previously in the dispatch of 9 January. He proposed that, immediately after the reasons for the expedition had been explained to the maliks of the other Afridi sections, the expedition should at once start for the Bazar Valley. He named two brigades with one brigade in reserve as the proposed strength of the force to be employed.

On the same day a reply was received to the dispatch of 9 January. The form in which the punitive measures were outlined in this dispatch was not generally approved, as suggesting a policy of annexation or permanent occupation of the Bazar Valley; but, in view of the incessant raids, The British Government was prepared to sanction an expedition, provided that it was confined to punitive measures or blockade. The British Government also considered that the neutrality of the remaining Afridis was all that could be expected of them, and that to expect their active co-operation would be trying them too high.

On 1 February the Indian Government still urged that, in order to prevent a recurrence of similar events in future, steps should be taken to open up the country of the Zakka Khel section. It was pointed out that a blockade on the lines of the Mahsud operations, 1901, would, owing to the geographical position of the Zakka Khel territory, be impossible without British troops entering into territory of other sections of the Afridis, whose friendship it was advisable to retain.

In a telegram received on 3 February from the Secretary of State, immediate action was approved of, provided that there was to be no annexation or occupation and that a strict limitation of time of duration of punitive operations was imposed. Details of the operations contemplated were asked for and it was suggested that a small detachment acting with great celerity might be sufficient for actual punitive measures in Bazar.

To this the Indian Government replied that small sallies of troops unsupported in Bazar Valley would involve a great risk of disaster to British troops, the result of which would undoubtedly be to set the whole frontier in a blaze. The following report of details of proposed operations was rendered:

The Zakka Kliel in the Bazar Valley can produce about 6,000 fighting men and we propose to move two brigades consisting of about a similar number, with two batteries, sappers, etc., into the valley at or near China, holding one brigade ready to support them if necessary. After occupying China the force in the Bazar Valley would act as circumstances may require with a view to the capture of the ringleaders and those implicated in the recent raids. During this period the passes surrounding the valley would be blockaded, and we propose to use a force of selected Khaibar Rifles who, we are assured, can be relied upon for the purpose, to assist in this.

These proposals were approved of by the British Government on 6 February and at the same time the following restriction was imposed on subsequent action in Bazar Valley:

It must be clearly understood that the end in view is strictly limited to the punishment of the Zakka Khels and neither immediately nor ultimately, directly or indirectly, must there be occupation or annexation of tribal territory.

Sir H. Deane was instructed to assemble the Maliks of the Afridis and to inform them of British actions against the Zakka Khel. This information was also to be conveyed to the Orakzai Maliks. As soon as the Afridi Maliks had been dismissed the expedition was to start.

In the meantime raids were still being carried out by the Zakka Khel in the Peshawar district. On 12 February Sir H. Deane saw the jirga of Afridi Maliks. He explained the position fully to them and advised them to go to their tribes and assist in making the Zakka. Kind come to a reasonable settlement, so that troops might be withdrawn from the Bazar Valley as quickly as possible. He dismissed the jirga on the same day (12 February). He reported that the attitude of the jirga appeared satisfactory, and that they seemed relieved to hear that punitive measures would be confined to the Zakka Khel. The Maliks returned to re-assure their tribesmen, after which they proposed to raise a lashkar and taking it to the Zakka Khel villages in Upper Bara to put the utmost pressure on Zakka Khel.

It was now reported that the Zakka Khel were moving their families, flocks and moveable property to Ningrahar and the Bara, and that they had buried their grain. A wholesale exodus via the Thabai Pass was also taking place. For political reasons it had been considered advisable to inform the emir of Afghanistan, Habibullah Khan, as of British intention as regards the expedition. Immediately after the dismissal of the jirga on 12 February a kharita was accordingly forwarded to him in the following terms:

I write to inform you that the Zakka Khel section of the Afridis have faithlessly broken their engagements with the Government of India and, notwithstanding the very kind and too compassionate treatment that I have meted out to them, have misunderstood my leniency and, by constant raids and murderous attacks on my law-abiding people, have filled up the cup of their iniquities. I can no longer shut my eyes to these nefarious proceedings, and I therefore write to inform you that I intend to punish these people, who deserve severe treatment, and I hope that, through the friendship that exists between us, Your Majesty will issue stringent orders to prevent any of these people from entering your territories or receiving assistance from the tribes on your side of the frontier.

Meanwhile, Major-General Sir J. Willcocks, K.C. M. G., had been selected to command the Zakka Khel Field Force. (Note: With Lieutenant Colonent G. O. Rroskeppel, C. I. E., as Political Adviser.) The force had been mobilized with the utmost secrecy. On 12 February Major Willcocks was informed that the expedition might start on 13 February, and on the same day he moved out from Peshawar. The following instructions were issued by the Government of India :

- The General Officer Commanding the Expedition is vested with full political control.
- The Political Agent, Khaibar, will accompany him as Chief Political Officer, and as such will advise and give him every possible assistance in political matters.
- The authority and responsibility of the General Officer Commanding must be complete, but he shall forward to the Government of India any statement of the views of the Chief Political Officer on any question of policy affecting the attitude of any of the tribes of the Khaibar or adjacent country, if for reasons recorded the Chief Political Officer so desires.
- The end in view is strictly limited to the punishment of the Zakka Khel and neither immediately nor ultimately, directly or indirectly, will there be occupation of or annexation of tribal territory.
- Every possible precaution must be taken to prevent any extension of the trouble to country outside the Bazar Valley.
- No terms of fine or surrender of raiders must be imposed on the Zakka Khel tribe without previous reference to the Government of India.
- It is necessary to punish the persons implicated in the numerous raids which have been organised in tribal territory and which have resulted in murder and robbery in British India. For the trial on the spot when possible of any such persons who may be captured the Political Agent, Khaibar, will take action with the fullest powers conferred by Government of India's order No. 1424-F., dated 25 May 1903.

Formal orders on this point follow.

- All communications on political questions will be addressed by the General Officer Commanding direct to the Foreign Secretary, Government of India, and repeated to the Chief of the Staff and also to the Chief Commissioner, Peshawar. Telegrams regarding military operations will be repeated to the Foreign Secretary, Government of India.

== Bazar valley ==
Location of China in modern-day Pakistan.
This village was described as a "great Zakka Khel stronghold".

The Bazar Valley, which is one of a series of parallel valleys running almost due east and west, is only about 20 miles (32 km) long with a varying breadth of between eight and twelve miles from watershed to watershed. The valley itself lies at an elevation of three thousand feet. On the north the Alachi mountains separate it from the Khaibar Pass and on the south the Sur Ghar range separates it from the Bara Valley. The highest peaks of these two ranges attain elevations of from 5000–7000 feet (1500–2100 meters). Through the valley runs the Bazar stream fed by tributaries draining the heights on either side, and flowing almost due east, till it joins the Khaibar stream at Jabagai. The eastern end of the valley is narrow and just before its final debouchure on to the Peshawar plain contracts into an almost impassable defile. The western end of the valley, on the other hand, is comparatively wide and open, and climbs gradually up to the magnificent snow capped range of the Safed Koh, the lower ridges of which form the boundary of the valley.

It was this upper portion of the valley which was owned by the Zakka Khel. It consisted of two main branches, each about 2 miles (3 km) broad, enclosing between them an irregular spur. This spur running out from the main watershed in a series of relatively small hills, ends in an abrupt peak, just above the great Zakka Khel stronghold, China. About 2.5 miles (4 km) east of China the two branch valleys unite and in the apex of their junction, closing the mouth of the China plain, is an isolated hill known as Khar Ghundai.

Through the circle of mountains to the south-west and west go four principal passes the Mangal Bagh and the Bukar giving access to the Bara Valley, and the Thabai and Tsatsobi leading into Afghanistan. The two former passes may be regarded as side-doors giving communication to near neighbours—the clans of the Bara Valley. The Thabai and Tsatsobi passes constitute the "back-doors" of the Bazar Valley, the "bolt-holes" into Afghan territory, by which, whenever their home is threatened from the Indian frontier, the tribesmen could retire, carrying with them their women and children and all moveable property.

The great difficulty in dealing with the Zakka Khel was due to the existence of this "back-door" and the knowledge that beyond it laid a sure and safe asylum. The "front-door" to the valley was from the Khaibar Pass and over the Alachi range, across which are four passes—the Chura, Alachi, Bori and Bazar. The first three had been made use of by British troops on former expeditions. Of all four the Chura was by far the easiest and it has the advantage, or disadvantage as the case may be, of leading through the territory of another clan, the Malikdin Khel, of which the chief, Yar Muhammad Khan, professed the deepest sympathy with the British cause.

== British plans ==
General Willcocks had formed the following plan of operations for entering the Bazar Valley: to concentrate the field force at Lala China and to despatch on the day after concentration an advanced brigade without transport and carrying emergency rations to China in Bazar by the Chura Pass. The rear brigade, with all transport for the force was to reach Chura on the same day and remain there ready to reinforce. Meanwhile, a flying column moving from Landi Kotal was to block the passes at the west end of the Bazar Valley.

It was, however, found that, owing to the heavy snow on the higher hills, the latter movement had to be modified, it being at that time impossible to reach the Thabai Pass on the Morga range from Landi Kotal, or to reach the Tsatsobi Pass without entering the Bazar Valley by the Bazar Pass.

=== British order of battle ===
On 12 February the expeditionary force, composed as follows, was assembled at Peshawar ready to make a forward movement.

Brigade	Commander	Composition
1st Brigade	Brigadier-General Anderson	1st Battalion, Royal Warwickshire Regiment; 53rd Sikhs; 59th Scinde Rifles; 2nd Battalion, 5th Gurkhas (Note: Temporarily attached to the 2nd Brigade.); Sections A and B, No. 1. British Field Hospital; No. 101, Native Field Hospital; Sections A and B, No. 102 Native Field Hospital (Note: Remained temporarily at the base.); Brigade Supply Column
2nd Brigade	Major-General Barrett	1st Battalion, Highlanders; 28th Punjabis; 45th Sikhs; 54th Sikhs; Sections C and D, No. 1 British Field Hospital; Sections C and D, No. 102 Native Field Hospital; No. 103 Native Field Hospital; Brigade Supply Column
Divisional Troops		
2 Squadrons, 19th lancers		
2 Squadrons, 37th lancers		
23rd Sikh Pioneers (Note: Temporarily attached to the 1st Brigade)		
25th Punjabis		
No. 3 Mountain Battery, Royal Garrison Artillery		
4 guns, 22nd (Derajat) Mountain Battery.		
No. 6 Company, 1st Sappers and Miners.		
Three sections No. 9 Company, 2nd Sappers and Miners.		
No. 105 Native Field Hospital		
Reserve brigades		
3rd Brigade (in reserve at Nowshera)	Major-General Watkis	1st Battalion, Royal Munster Fusiliers (Note: Retained at Nowshera.); 23rd Peshawar Mountain Battery.; 1st Battalion, 5th Gurkhas. (Note: Retained at Peshawar); 55th Coke's rifles; 25th Punjabis (Note: Temporarily on the Line of Communication.); Sections A and B, No. 2 British Field Hospital.; No. 112 Native Field Hospital.; Sections A and B., No. 113 Native Field Hospital.; Brigade Supply Column.

== Conflict ==
=== Opening moves (12–16 February) ===
Colonel Roos-Keppel was placed in command of the flying column, which was to advance from Landi Kotal. The wing of the 2nd 5th Gurkhas left Jamrud on the evening of 12 February en route for Landi Kotal. On the 13th, the posts of Khaibar Rifles. the Khaibar Rifles, as far as Ali Musjid, were taken over by the 25th Punjabis from the 3rd Reserve Brigade and two squadrons of the 19th Lancers from the Divisional Troops. Colonel S. Biddulphwas placed in command of the Line of Communications. The Khaibar Rifles on being relieved marched to Landi Kotal. at which place on the evening of the 14th, the flying column was assembled and ready for the move into the Bazar Valley. At 4:00 a.m. on the 15th, Colonel Roos-Keppel left Landi Kotal with his force and by 9-15 A. M. reached the crest of the Bazar Pass without meeting with any opposition. From the Bazar Pass the force continued its march south, and arrived at China the same evening. China was found to be unoccupied and the towers and enclosures of the village gave shelter from the fire of the snipers who, as usual, opened fire as soon as it was dark. One is said to have been killed and another wounded during the night.

The main column under General Willcocks left Peshawar on the morning of 13 February and halted that night at Jamrud. On the following day Ali Musjid was reached. On the 15th the field force left Lala China and entered the Bazar Valley by the Ohura Pass. At daybreak the 2nd Brigade with certain additional troops advanced, simultaneously with the movement of the "flying column" by the Bazar Pass. General Willcocks accompanied this column. Three days' rations were carried on the person by all ranks. An echelon 1st Line Transport and detachments of No. 1 British and No. 103 Native Field Hospital only were taken. The remainder of the 2nd Brigade Baggage and supply columns marched in rear of the 1st Brigade, which followed the 2nd Brigade. The 59th Rifles from the 1st Brigade were left at Ali Musjid.

==== Battle of Khar Gundai ====
Battle of Khar Gundai
Date	15–16 February 1908
Location	East of the crest of Khar Gundai
Result	British victory

Belligerents
British Raj	Anai Zalcka Khel; Sangu Khel

Commanders and leaders
James Willcocks	Dadai (WIA)

Units involved
1st Brigade	N/A

Casualties and losses
1 killed 2 wounded	3 killed 7 wounded

As the first part of the march was through Malikdin Khel - opposition was not expected, nor was it encountered. Passing Chura the column turned west up the Bazar Valley, and until Tsarkhum on the borders of Zakka Khel Country was reached, no shot was fired. Tsarkhum stands on a steep cliff overlooking the Bazar Tangi, and as the advanced guard reached this point fire was opened from the high hill Tsapara, and the left flank piquets, covered by the guns, were engaged the whole way to Walai, near where the column halted for the night. The wing of the 2-5th Gurkhas was left to occupy Tsapara. and thus secure the line of communication with Chura where the 1st Brigade and baggage columns were to halt for the night of the 18th-19th. South of Walai, and in the fork formed by the junction of the Bazar and Walai nalas, stands a hill called Khar Gundai, which occupies a commanding position in the Bazar valley.

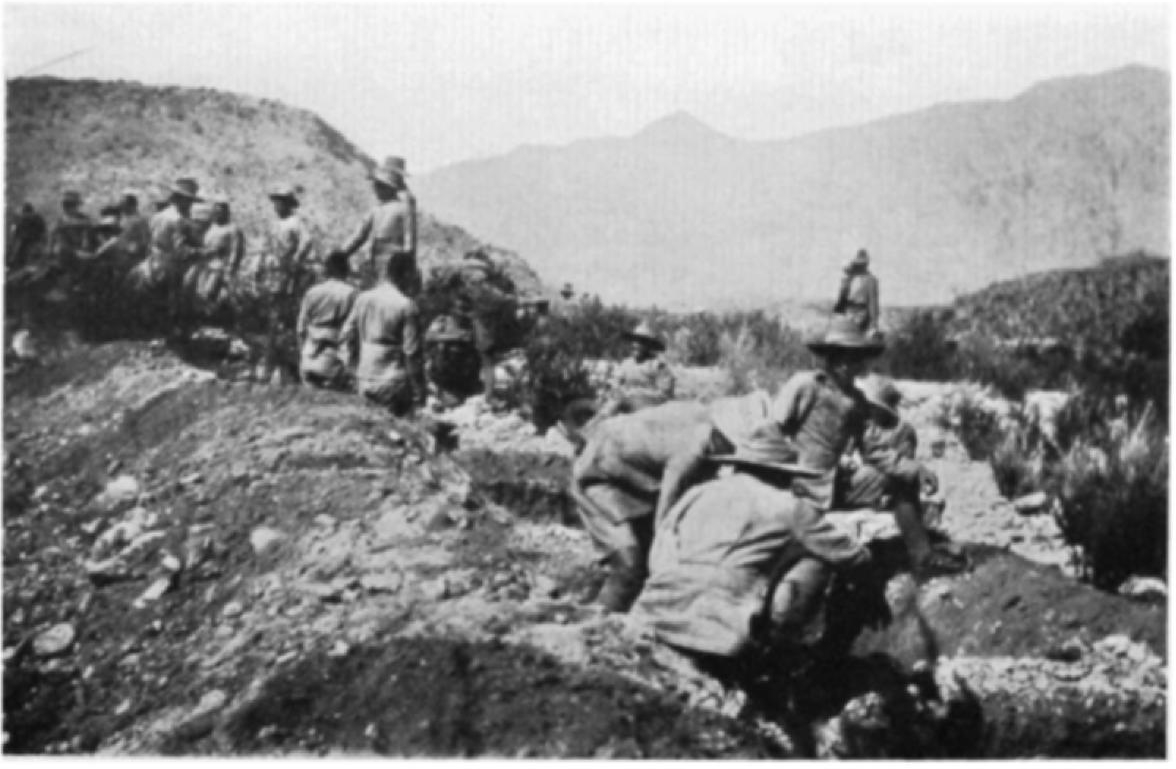
2-5th Digging in on reaching Walai

Contrary to all expectation this was found to be unoccupied by the enemy. Taking shelter from snipers the force bivouacked for the night in the nala about 1,500 yards (1,370 meters) due east of the crest of Khar Gundai, which was piquetted by the Seaforth Highlanders. During the night, these piquets and others surrounding the camp were heavily fired on. The enemy, who appear to have been chiefly Anai Zalcka Khel and Sangu Khel, were led by Dadai, the notorious raider who was severely wounded. It is said that three of the enemy were killed and seven wounded, whilst the casualties in General Willcocks' column were one killed and two wounded. Early on the morning of the 16th, signalling communication was established with Colonel Boos-Keppel's column at China and General Willcocks having selected a site for his standing camp nearer to Walai, the Landi Kotal column moved in to join him there. During the day the baggage and supply columns were brought up from Chura, where the strong fort belonging to Yar Mahomed Khan of the Malikdin Khel had been occupied by the 1st Brigade under General Anderson on the previous day.

==== Battle of Sara Pial ====
A piquet of the 45th Sikhs, forming part of an escort to a convoy of supplies, was attacked whilst on the lower slopes of Sara Paial hill by Anai Zakka Khel led by Multan. The hill which the enemy had occupied was carried by the 46th Sikhs with the loss of two men wounded. They were supported by the Seaforth Highlanders and mountain guns. The site selected for the camp, a well concealed position practically in the bed of the Walai Stream, was surrounded by the Khar Gundai and a circle of hills to the north, all of which were piquetted. This position had the advantage of a well secured line of communication with the 1st Brigade at Chura, and at the same time it gave complete command of the whole valley. General Willcocks was now able to turn his attention to carrying out punitive measures. Owing to the naturally barren nature of the country it was almost impossible to inflict any serious damage upon the Zakka Khel. The village of China, the most important settlement in the valley was the first objective, and on the following day its destruction was commenced.

=== British advance, destruction of China village (16–22 February) ===
==== 16–17 February ====
Desultory firing into camp took place on the night of the 16th, but the troops had been able to provide themselves with sufficient cover and no casualties were reported. Telephonic communication had been established between Head-Quarters and the most important piquets, from which early information was obtained of the enemy's movements. During the morning the enemy were seen to be moving about amongst the hills near China and building sangars. The mountain guns opened fire from Zir Ghund and about 200 men were seen to retreat south towards Halwai. It was also reported that earlier in the morning three or four hundred had been seen leaving Jabagai, that about a hundred were in Halwai and that the towers along the Bazar nala were occupied. During the day most of the 1st Brigade marched in from Chura, so that sufficient troops were available to form two columns for daily operations in the valley.

==== 18 February ====
A mixed column under General Barrett moved out before day break to destroy the towers and enclosures at China. The Seaforth Highlanders and Gurkhas, moving by Sarmundo and Khwar and covered by the mountain guns, occupied the hills north of China. Lieutenant Macfadyen, attached Seaforth Highlanders, was mortally wounded in this advance. Meanwhile, the remainder of the column arrived at China, destroyed the main towers and collected a quantity of wood and fodder. On leaving to return to camp the column was followed up by the enemy. The troops retired steadily. The battery and its escort in the comparatively open country south of China was specially selected by the enemy for attack. The 54th Sikhs, who were also on this flank, were hotly engaged, some of the tribesmen approaching to revolver range. By 4:30 p.m. the Gurkhas, who held the hills above China, had moved off them and the Seaforth Highlanders had also come down from the eastern slopes which they had occupied. The Zakka Khel, who made fruitless attempts to follow up the retirement, lost heavily and it was noticeable that in future they were more careful to avoid open country.

As the troops retired within the camp piquets, the enemy's fire slackened gradually and by 6 p.m. had ceased. Not a single shot was fired at the piquets during the night. The total casualties were three officers, two British rank and file, and four native rank and file wounded. It was reported on this day that large numbers of the Bazar Zakka Khel and many Sanga Khel Shinwari volunteers were collected at the Thabai and Mangal Bagh passes, also that traders in ammunition had arrived from Afghanistan and were selling their supplies at half the usual rate. On the other hand, reports were also received that jirgas of the other Afridi tribes were collecting with a view to coming in to arrange a settlement and that many of the tribes were anxious for peace.

==== 19 February ====
A column under the command of General Anderson marched out of camp Walai at 7-15 a.m. The object of the day's operations was to complete the destruction of China and to collect forage. No opposition was encountered during the forward movement, but the enemy endeavored to harass the retirement. Two hundred and fifty mule loads of fodder were collected, and camp was reached at 5:30 p.m. without any casualties on the British side.

==== 20 February ====
A column under General Anderson advanced towards the Tsatsobi pass in order to carry out a reconnaissance in that direction. On the way the towers at Khwar and Sarmando were destroyed. As the column approached the pass the advanced guard was fired on from the hills on both sides, and the left flanking battalions were attacked on the hills west of China. Information regarding this route, as far as the foot of the pass, was obtained for incorporation in the survey of the valley and the column returned to camp. Casualties nil.

==== 21 February ====
During the last few days the enemy had been seen gathering in considerable strength in the vicinity of Halwai, in the south-western corner of the valley, where they had been joined by many Sangu Khel and other Shinwaris from the direction of the Thabai pass. On the 21st two columns under Generals Barrett and Anderson moved out to deliver a combined attack on this position. Soon after daylight the 28th Punjabis occupied the heights near China and held them during the day to cover the retirement, the remainder of General Barrett's column taking the route south of China. The Khaibar Rifles and No. 6 Company Sappers moved by the Bazar nala and destroyed the towers of Kago Kamar. The enemy kept up a continuous fire on this place during the whole day. The Seaforth Highlanders on the extreme left occupied the Saran Hills and kept the enemy to the south and west of Halwai.

Meanwhile, General Anderson's column moving north of China by Khwar and the Sarwakai pass debouched on to the plain north of Halwai. During this movement the enemy kept up a dropping fire from the direction of Pastakai. The two columns now advanced simultaneously. The steep cliffs overlooking Halwai were occupied without a check, the mountain guns making the enemy's sangars quite untenable. The right of General Anderson's column was well protected from any attack from the direction of the Thabai or Mangal Eagh passes by the 59th Rifles. The towers and stacks of timber in Halwai were destroyed and the force commenced its return march to camp. This was, as usual, the signal for numerous parties to come down from the Thabai direction. These opened fire at long ranges, but the Mountain Battery kept them on the move.

Both Brigades were now moving by the south of China hills, which were held by the 28th Punjabis. As the rearmost battalion arrived abreast of China, the enemy's fire had almost died away, but as the 28th Punjabis covered by the fire of the guns began to leave the hills, the tribesmen appeared in considerable numbers and closely pressed the battalion. The Punjabis withdrew steadily, but lost one man killed and eight wounded. On the left the Seaforth Highlanders and Khaibar Rifles were also attacked, the enemy advancing to close range suffered many casualties. Whilst directing his rearmost companies at this stage of the fight Major Hon'ble Forbes-Sempill, commanding the Seaforth Highlanders, was killed. The 53rd Sikhs, who formed the rear centre, covered the retirement. On the arrival of the rear guard east of China hills, the enemy drew off and only fired at long ranges. British casualties for the day were one officer and one sepoy killed, and ten native rank and file wounded. Not a shot was fired into camp this night.

==== 22 February ====
The force stayed in camp and only ordinary convoy duties were done. Sangu Khel and other Shinwaris continued to arrive by the Thabai Pass, and although the most influential Maliks of the Afridi tribes were now assembling at Chura to arrange terms of peace, it was feared that the presence of these reinforcements would have the effect of delaying a settlement. On this night the tribesmen tried sniping from several directions simultaneously, and some of them again pushed up close to the piquets. A non-commissioned officer was wounded.

=== Moves towards a peace settlement (23–27 February) ===
==== 23 February ====
A column under General Anderson moved out during the morning to China to collect fuel, the scarcity of which was beginning to make itself felt in camp. The opposition offered was half-hearted. Two hundred and fifty mule loads of fuel were collected. During the afternoon nearly 400 men representing the united Afridi jirga, came in from Chura and appeared extremely anxious to arrange a settlement. The Maliks even professed themselves ready to use force to bring the Zakka Khel to terms.

==== 24 February ====
The jirga was interviewed by Colonel Roos-Keppel. They expressed confidence in their ability to effect a settlement with the Zakka Khel and all, even the Pakkai Zakka Khel, were agreed that no settlement would be satisfactory, which did not provide for the punishment of the individual raiders. A suspension of operations for two days (25 and 26 February) was granted to allow the jirga to meet the Zakka Khel and discuss terms with them at Halwai.

==== 25 February ====
The Afridi jirga left on the morning to meet the Zakka Khel at Halwai. They had to perform a delicate task, which was meet the Zakka Khei rendered even more difficult by the presence of Sangu Khel volunteers who stood around the jirga shouting abuse, endeavoured to persuade the Zakka Khel to further resistance. The maliks had urged that the presence of the troops in the valley was necessary in order to give weight to their representations to the Zakka Khel and that if they were withdrawn before their deliberations were completed, they could not guarantee the success of their mission. General Willcocks had meanwhile been informed that no rigid limitation was imposed on his stay in the valley, provided a settlement was quickly arrived at and followed by the early withdrawal of the troops. In spite of the interference of this outside element at the jirga, the counsels of the maliks prevailed and the representative elders of the Zakka Khel took an oath on the Koran to abide by their decisions.

==== 26–27 February ====
A water escort of the 45th Sikhs on Tsapara Hill was attacked in thick scrub jungle and lost one sepoy killed and two wounded. Early in the morning of this day terms having been arranged, the Afridi jirga started back to report the result to General Willcocks. However they were delayed by a miscellaneous lashkar consisting of Sangu Khel Shinwaris, about a thousand Ningra- haris and a few Mohmands, which advanced from the direction of the Thabai Pass. The Zakka Khel prevailed upon these to withdraw again to the western end of the valley pointing out that they had come too late to be of use and that they would only spoil the settlement which all the Afridis desired. After some demur this Iashkar agreed to wait until the negotiations of the jirga were known. Owing to these delays the Waiab Prga return to jirga arrived too late to be received at Walai on this day, and on the 27th they were met and conducted into camp by the Chief Political Officer after depositing their rifles for safe custody.

=== Peace settlement, British withdrawal (28 February–1 March) ===
==== 27–28 February ====
Zakka Khel peace settlement
- Type: Peace
- Drafted: 28 February 1908
- Location: Walai
- Effective: 28 February 1908
- Negotiators: (British Empire) James Willcocks
- Parties: British Empire; Zakka Khel

The night of the 27th was spent in discussing the details of settlement, and by the afternoon on the 28th a document drawn up in Persian by General Willcocks. and giving the full terms, was presented to General Willcocks in public jirga. This document was endorsed by all the maliks and influential elders, and in it was apportioned to different clans the responsibility the good behaviour of the various Zakka Khel sections. They promised to assist each other in punishing bad characters and agreed that Government might punish them for the misdeeds of those for whom they stood security. General Willcocks seeing that these terms more than satisfied the demands of Government formally accepted them. Meanwhile, secret orders had been issued for the withdrawal of the troops on the following day. The Zakka Khel and such other of the jirgas as desired were allowed to proceed to China at once, and the work of strengthening the camp was carried out as usual. During this night, before the terms of agreement were known at Chura, the camp there was heavily sniped and four native soldiers were wounded.

==== 29 February ====
Early in the morning General Barrett's brigade commenced their return march to Ali Musjid via the Chura Pass. By 9 a.m. the baggage and transport of both brigades 20 had left Walai Camp and by 10 a.m. the rearmost piquets began to withdraw. General Anderson's brigade covered the withdrawal and remained at Chura on the night, whilst General Barrett's brigade had marched straight through to Ali Musjid.

==== 1 March ====
All troops except the 59th Rifles and 2 Squadrons, 19th Lancers, which were left as a guard over the stores at Ali Musjid, arrived at Jamrud, and on the following day at Peshawar. During the entire operations not a single follower, public or private, was killed or wounded and only one rifle was lost, belonging to a man killed whilst skirmishing in thick bush. From the time the force left Walai Camp until its arrival in British India not a shot was fired.

== Aftermath ==
The results of the expedition appeared in every way successful. The Afridi jirga had undertaken the punishment of the raiders and the responsibility for their future good behaviour. After the return of the troops the whole jirga came to Peshawar to discuss with the Political Agent the nature of the punishment to be inflicted upon the raiders. They organised a jirga of about 600 men, representatives of each Afridi clan, to visit the Zakka Khel settlements in turn. This jirga spent about a month in Zakka Khel country, living on the inhabitants according to tribal custom. This proceeding in itself constituted a punishment. They succeeded in getting hold of all the raiders except Multan, who had taken refuge in Afghan territory. They beat them and took away their booty, which was subsequently handed over to the Political Agent at Jamrud for return to the owners. They deposited some rifles as a pledge that they would not allow Multan to settle in Tirah until he had been properly punished and they further made a petition that Government would request the Amir either to surrender him and like refugees or to expel them. Whilst at Jamrud the jirgas were pestered by numerous messengers from the Mohmands and from Afghanistan urging them to join in a rising and to threaten Peshawar. Although this produced an unsettling effect no trouble resulted. The Maliks and elders of the Aftidis had fully redeemed their promises and they were rewarded by the Government.

=== Casualties ===
James Willocks assessed that the rebel forces had suffered at least 70 killed and even more wounded. The rebels were disinclined to give details about their losses, partly owing to their pride and partly owing to the fear of the evil eye, to which wounded men were particularly susceptible. The British recorded among the officers, 1 killed, 4 wounded, 0 missing, and others as suffering 2 killed, 33 wounded, 0 missing.
