= The Impossible Woman =

- Directed by: Meyrick Milton
- Based on: Tante by Anne Douglas Sedgwick; The Impossible Woman by C. Haddon Chambers
- Starring: Constance Collier; Langhorn Burton; Christine Rayner; Alan Byrne; Edith Craig
- Production company: Ideal Film Renting Company
- Distributed by: Ideal Film Renting Company
- Release date: September 1919
- Running time: 5 reels; 1,524 metres
- Country: United Kingdom
- Language: Silent

The Impossible Woman is a 1919 British silent comedy film directed by Meyrick Milton and starring Constance Collier, Langhorn Burton and Christine Rayner. It was based on the 1912 novel Tante by Anne Douglas Sedgwick, and 1916 play of the same name by C. Haddon Chambers.

== Cast ==
- Constance Collier as Mme. Kraska
- Langhorn Burton as Gregory Jardine
- Christine Rayner as Karen
- Alan Byrne as Edwin Drew
- Edith Craig as Mrs. Talcotte
