= Anne Douglas Sedgwick =

British writer (1873–1935)

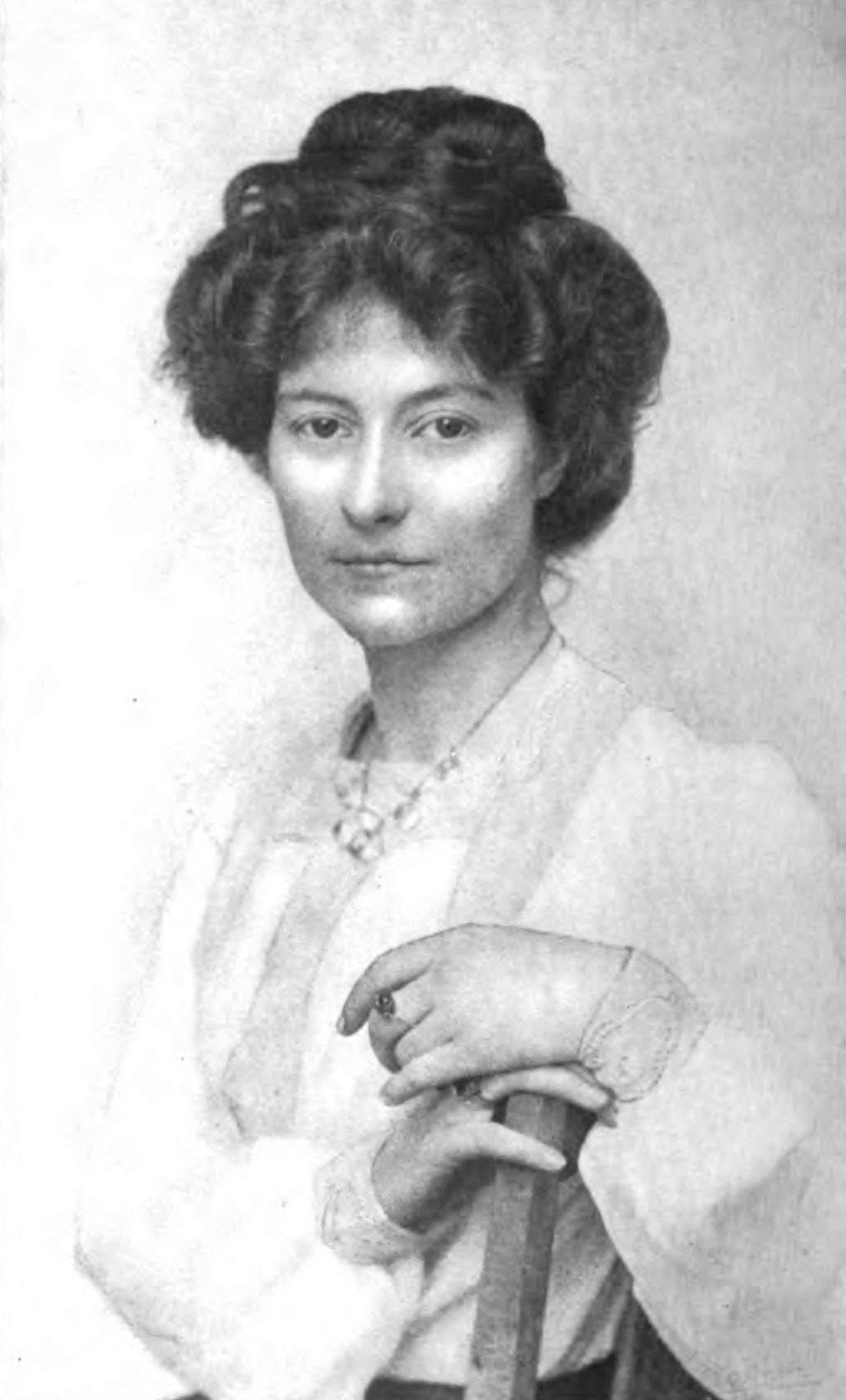
- Anne Douglas Sedgwick (1903)
- Born: 28 March 1873; Englewood, New Jersey, United States
- Died: 19 July 1935 (aged 62); Hampstead, England
- Occupation: Novelist
- Spouse: Basil de Sélincourt
- Writing career
- Notable works: Tante, The Little French Girl

Anne Douglas Sedgwick (28 March 1873 – 19 July 1935) was an American-born British writer. She wrote novels throughout her adult life, two collections of short stories, and a volume of reminiscences of the Comtesse de Cabarru.

== Biography ==
The daughter of George Stanley Sedgwick, a businessman, and Mary (Douglas) Sedgwick, she was born in Englewood, New Jersey. At age nine, her family moved to London, and she was based in England for the rest of her life, though she made return visits to the United States. As a young woman, she studied art in Paris for five years before turning to writing.

In 1908, she married the British essayist and journalist Basil de Sélincourt. During World War I, she and her husband were volunteer workers in hospitals and orphanages in France.

Her novels, which frequently feature artists or musicians and are set in English or French country houses, explore the contrast in values between Americans and Europeans, leading her to be compared to Henry James. Her best-selling novel Tante was made into a 1919 film entitled The Impossible Woman; likewise The Little French Girl was made into a 1925 film of the same name. In 1931, she was elected to the United States National Institute of Arts and Letters. Four of her books were on the list of bestselling novels in the United States for 1912, 1924, 1927, and 1929, as determined by The New York Times.

Sedgwick died in Hampstead, England, in 1935. The following year her husband published Anne Douglas Sedgwick: A Portrait in Letters.

== Bibliography ==
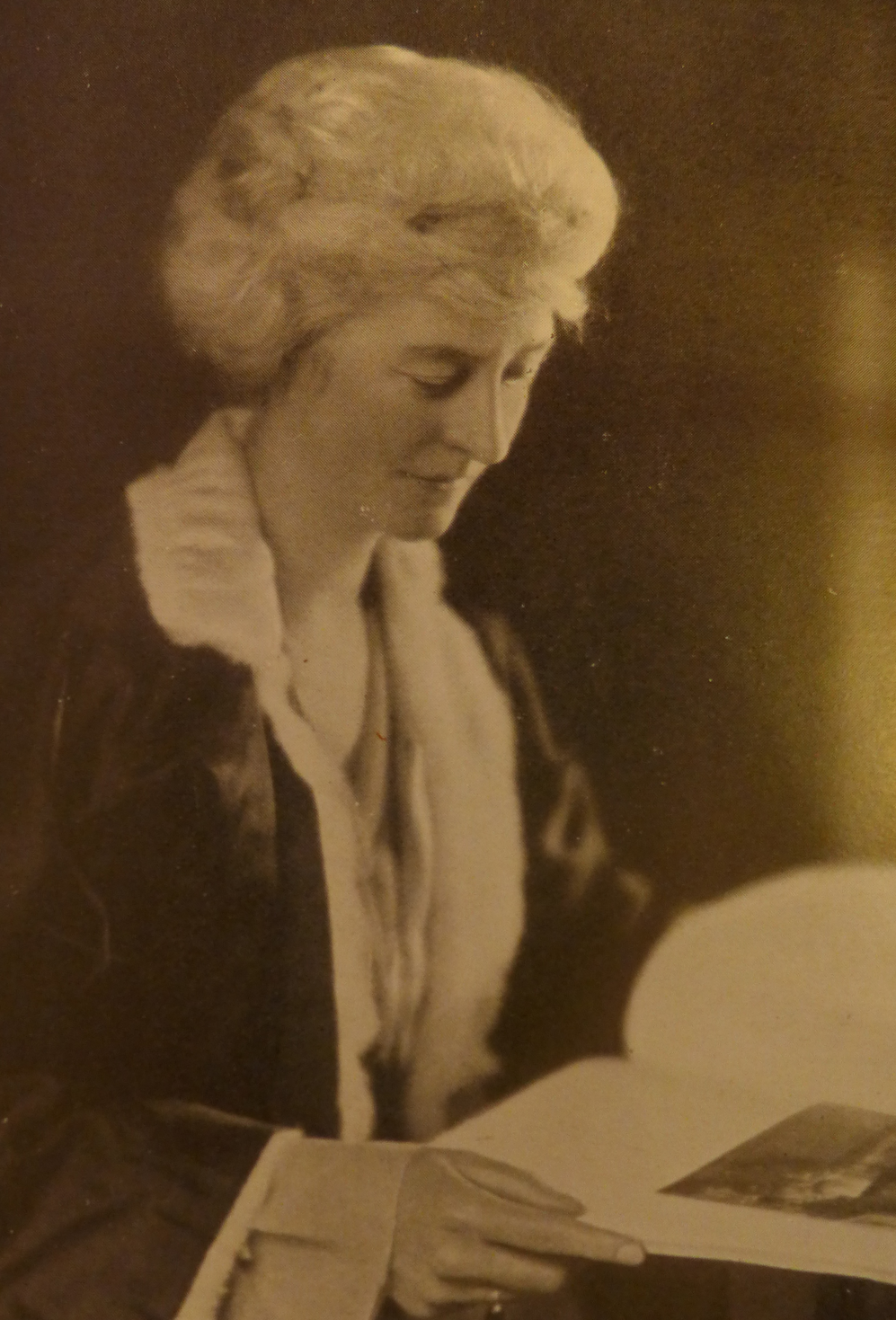
Anne Douglas Sedgwick circa 1921

=== Novels ===
- The Dull Miss Archinard (1898)
- The Confounding of Camelia (1899)
- The Rescue (1902)
- Paths of Judgement (1904)
- The Shadow of Life (1906)
- A Fountain Sealed (1907)
- Valerie Upton (1908)
- Amabel Channice (1908)
- Franklin Winslow Kane (1910)
- Tante (1912) – No.9 for the year in the U.S.
- The Encounter (1914)
- The Third Window (1920)
- Adrienne Toner (1922)
- The Little French Girl (1924) – No.3 for the year in the U.S.
- The Old Countess (1927) – No.9 for the year in the U.S.
- Dark Hester (1929) – No.3 for the year in the U.S.
- Philippa (1929)

=== Short stories ===
- The Nest (1913)
- Christmas Roses and Other Stories (1920)

=== Non-fiction ===
- A Childhood in Brittany Eighty Years Ago (1919)

=== Letters ===
- Anne Douglas Sedgwick: A Portrait in Letters (ed. Basil de Selincourt, 1936)
