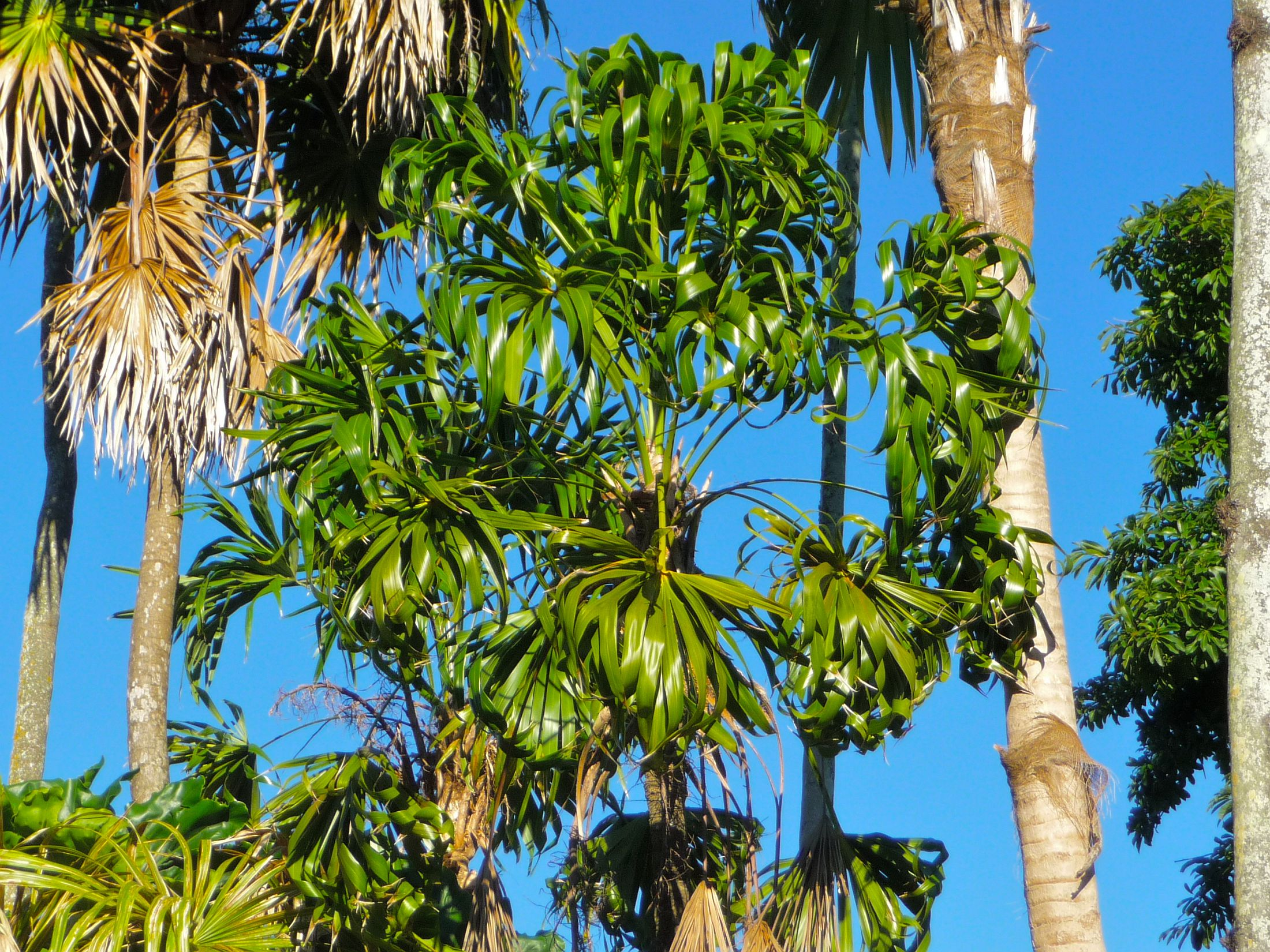
- Thrinax parviflora var. parviflora at Fairchild Tropical Botanic Garden, Coral Gables, Florida, United States

Scientific classification
- Kingdom: Plantae
- Clade: Tracheophytes
- Clade: Angiosperms
- Clade: Monocots
- Clade: Commelinids
- Order: Arecales
- Family: Arecaceae
- Genus: Thrinax
- Species: T. parviflora

Binomial name
- Thrinax parviflora (Burret) Borhidi & Muniz

= Thrinax parviflora =

Species of palm

Thrinax parviflora is a palm which is endemic to the Blue Mountains of Jamaica where it occurs in open and rocky, seasonally dry open deciduous forest up to 900-metre (3,000 ft) elevation.

== Taxonomy ==
Some botanists recognize two subspecies, one being Thrinax parviflora var. parviflora.

== Description ==
It grows a slender, smooth trunk no more than six inches (150 mm) with a maximum height of 50 feet (15 m). It is topped by an open crown of smallish, very thick, and leathery fan leaves 3–4 feet (0.91–1.22 m) in diameter with curiously twisted and curled, heavily veined grass green segments. Adult palms are graceful due to the nature of the crown and the rather thin trunk.

== Horticulture ==
This palm is rare in cultivation. However, because it will grow to some elevation and tolerate drier conditions, it is expected to thrive in subtropical climates and favorable warm temperate climates, tolerating an occasional light frost. It is tolerant of limerock and coastal exposure.
