= Chinese civilization =

Chinese civilization may be related to:

- Chinese culture
- The country China
- The geographic region covered by the term Greater China
- The history of China
- The amalgamated ethnic group Zhonghua minzu

== See also ==
- Sinosphere
- Adoption of Chinese literary culture
