= China, Pakistan =

Village in Khyber Pakhtunkhwa, Pakistan

China
- Location in Pakistan China (Khyber Pakhtunkhwa)
- Coordinates: 33.9954926°N 71.056917°E
- Country: Pakistan
- Province: Khyber Pakhtunkhwa
- District: Khyber District

China is a village in north-western Pakistan. It is located in Khyber District, formerly part of the Federally Administered Tribal Areas, which in 2018 were merged into the Khyber Pakhtunkhwa Province. During the 1900s decade, this village served as an important stronghold for elements of the Zakha Khel as a raiding base, prompting British authorities to launch the Bazar Valley campaign to pacify the region. In that campaign, China was largely destroyed by British forces in an attempt to force the Zakha Khel into a peace agreement.
