= Kalisi Naduddam =

- Official poster
- Directed by: Kodi Ramakrishna
- Written by: Diwakar Babu (dialogues)
- Screenplay by: Kodi Ramakrishna
- Story by: Sree Venkateswara Art Films Unit
- Produced by: Burugapally Sivarama Krishna
- Starring: Srikanth; Soundarya
- Cinematography: Adusumalli Vijayakumar
- Edited by: Nandamuri Hari Babu
- Music by: S. A. Rajkumar
- Production company: Sree Venkateswara Art Films
- Release date: 29 June 2001
- Country: India
- Language: Telugu

Kalisi Naduddam (transl. Let's walk together) (Note: The title refers to that women should not walk behind men and instead should walk together.) is a 2001 Indian Telugu-language romantic drama film directed by Kodi Ramakrishna. The film stars Srikanth and Soundarya. It features music composed by S. A. Rajkumar. The plot follows relationship between Krishna and Vijaya, a married couple with opposing ideologies.

Kalisi Naduddam was released theatrically on 29 June 2001.

== Plot ==
Krishna is a government employee who is not satisfied with his meagre salary. He is married to Vijaya, a progressive woman who is devoted to her husband, in an arranged marriage. In order to earn money quickly, he leaves his job and invests the dowry received from his wife Vijaya and her jewellery in the real estate and prawns business. Vijaya is against this and firmly believes that a job which offers a fixed salary is much better than such risky business plans. Krishna, however, remains unbudged and challenges himself to leave her should he lose her money in business. Afraid of Krishna's attitude, Vijaya resolves to bring a change in her husband.

As expected, Krishna suffers losses due to his reckless attitude while Vijaya gradually sees success in her and becomes an inspiration for the fellow women in her neighbourhood. Vijaya is honoured for her work toward the empowerment of women. Krishna realizes his misdeeds and apologizes to Vijaya on stage.

== Cast ==
- Srikanth as Krishna
- Soundarya as Vijaya
- Sudhakar
- Brahmanandam
- M. S. Narayana
- Mallikarjuna Rao
- L. B. Sriram
- Sri Lakshmi
- Rama Prabha
- Jr. Relangi
- Alphonsa
- Suma Kanakala

== Production ==
The film was launched during the first week of February 2001. Filming began on 3 February 2001. Srikanth and Soundarya both worked on this film and another film titled Manasista Raa.

== Soundtrack ==
Music by S. A. Rajkumar. Telugucinema wrote "The songs are in general melodious and should be an asset for such a medium-budget movie. The list of lyricists and playback singers suggests that almost everyone from among the prime choices took part to make the movie a musical hit. The songs probably can sell well, if they're picturized in an equally good manner. Most songs seem to be shorter than usual. S.A. Raj Kumar needs to be commended specially for maintaining the melody in the songs without overriding the lyrics under heavy metallic sounds and for not killing the meaning with awkwardly pronouncing singers."

- "Okka Sari Krindiki" – Sujatha, Hariharan
- "Kanchare Kanchare" – Sujatha, Hariharan
- "Yenati Sarasami" – K. S. Chitra
- "Jil Jil Jil Jil" – Swarnalatha, Mano
- "Atu Itu Chudake" – S. P. Balasubrahmanyam, K. S. Chitra

== Reception ==
A critic for Sify wrote, "This is another such attempt to make tears flow to float currency into producer’s bank account. Story is as old as Telugu film industry. There were many such movies Telugu viewers watched earlier". Bhargav Shastry of Full Hyderabad wrote, "Every alternate scene in the film is a glaringly irritating comic scene, and that kills the tempo. Incongruously placed songs sans melody irk you every now and then. Srikant's character as the arrogant MCP gets on your nerves. Soundarya, though, gives a very good performance as we've grown to expect from her".

On the contrary, Griddaluru Gopalrao of Zamin Ryot gave a positive review for the film. He appreciated Kodi Ramakrishna for bringing novelty in screenplay and direction while praising the performances of Srikanth and Soundarya as a married couple. A critic for Andhra Today wrote, "A simple plot combined judiciously with entertainment has been made impressive mainly for the women audience by the director. A gripping screen-play without losing sight of the central idea is a plus point for this movie. Humor that matches the theme without sermonizing on some principles will gel well with the audience".
