= Kinna (Illyria) =

Ancient human settlement

Kinna was an ancient town of the Kinambroi, a tribe of Illyrians, located to the east of Lake Skadar.
