= Chyna Doll =

Chyna Doll may refer to:

- Chyna Doll (album), an album by Foxy Brown
- Chyna Doll or Chyna (1969–2016), American professional wrestler

== See also ==
- China doll (disambiguation)
