= Chinna Pillai =

Indian microfinancier

Chinna Pillai is a community leader from Pulliseri, a small village near Madurai, Tamil Nadu, India. She had started a very successful banking system in the villages of Tamil Nadu, and has made many contributions to attempt to reduce poverty and debt grievances by empowering women. She made efforts in starting a savings unit among the women of the village of Pullucheri. Chinna Pillai is illiterate and can only sign her name. She was recognized as a leader because of people find her negotiation skills effective. She bargained on behalf of workers and eventually the employers realized that there may be some benefit in paying higher wages.

== Recognition ==
Chinna Pillai was one of five women to receive the Stree Shakti Puraskar in 1999. In a picture perfect moment for the press, then-Prime Minister Atal Bihari Vajpayee bowed down in respect and touched her feet while presenting her with the award. She had received the Padma Shri for her service in 2019.
