= China Lake (disambiguation) =

Naval Air Weapons Station China Lake is a United States military facility in California.

China Lake may also refer to:

== Places in the United States ==
- China Lake, Kern County, California, an unincorporated community named for a nearby dry lake
- China Lake Acres, California, a census-designated place (CDP)
- China Lake (Maine), a pond in Kennebec County
- China Lake, Sacramento, California former lake in the City of Sacramento

== Other uses ==
- China Lake (film), a 1983 thriller film
- China Lake grenade launcher, developed at the military facility
- China Lake, a 1992 novel by Anthony Hyde
- The China Lake Murders, a 1990 film
