= China Doll (band) =

China Doll was a pop duo of the early 1980s comprising singer songwriter Fay Goodman and keyboard player Mark Wolski. They were signed to the EMI Parlophone label and had a hit single in Europe (Top 10 in France) with "Turkish Delight". Fay Goodman went on to become a martial arts teacher and writer.

== Discography ==
Singles

- 1980: "Oysters and Wine", B-side "Past Tense"
- 1981: "China Doll", B-side "Jade"
- 1983: "Turkish Delight", B-side "Red Lantern"
