= Chinna (Dardania) =

Ancient Illyrian settlement in present-day Kosovo

Chinna was an Illyrian settlement located near the White Drin, near the modern-day settlement of Klina, Kosovo. It was settled by the ancient Dardani tribe.

== See also ==
- List of ancient cities in Illyria
