= John Asser =

Governor of Bermuda (1867–1949)

General Sir John Asser KCB KCMG KCVO
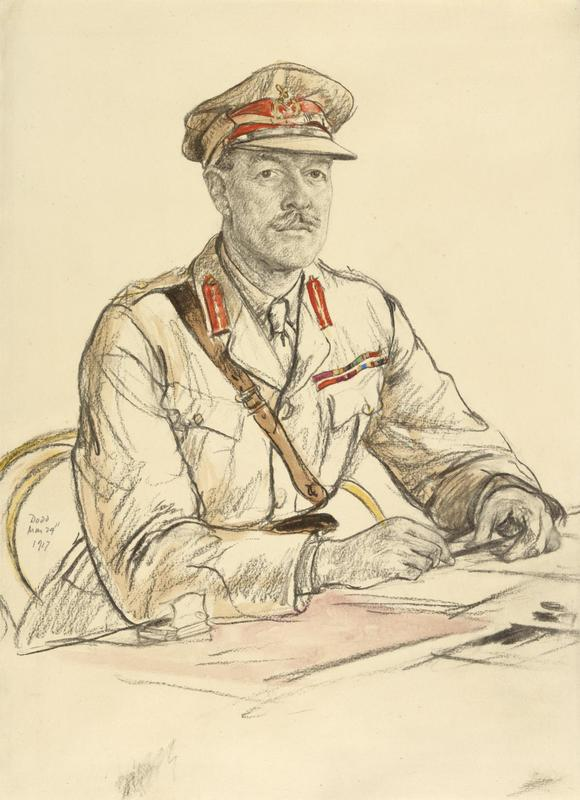
- Major-General Sir Joseph John Asser by Francis Dodd
- Born: 31 August 1867; Dartford, Kent, England
- Died: 4 February 1949 (aged 81)
- Military career
- Allegiance: United Kingdom
- Branch: British Army
- Service years: 1887–1930
- Rank: General
- Commands: Bermuda (1922–1927); British Troops in France and Flanders (1919)
- Conflicts: Mahdist War; First World War
- Awards: Knight Commander of the Order of the Bath; Knight Commander of the Order of St Michael and St George; Knight Commander of the Royal Victorian Order; Mentioned in Despatches

General Sir Joseph John Asser, KCB, KCMG, KCVO (31 August 1867 – 4 February 1949) was a British Army officer.

== Early career ==
Asser was born on 31 August 1867, the son of S. B. V. Asser of Windlesham, Surrey. He entered the Dorsetshire Regiment in September 1887 and was appointed aide-de-camp to the General Officer Commanding, Egypt in 1892. He served in the Nile expedition of 1897 and was awarded the medal and clasp; in 1898 he was promoted to captain. For his service in the Nile expedition of 1898 he was granted the brevet rank of major and awarded the medal with two clasps, and for the Nile expedition of 1899 a further clasp. He was promoted to the substantive rank of major in 1907 and to lieutenant colonel the same year. From 1907 to 1914 he was adjutant-general of the Egyptian Army; during this period he commanded the Southern Kordofan expedition in 1910, for which he was awarded the medal and clasp. He was also an Egyptian pasha and a member for some years of the Sudan Government Council. He had been appointed a colonel in July 1911.

== First World War ==
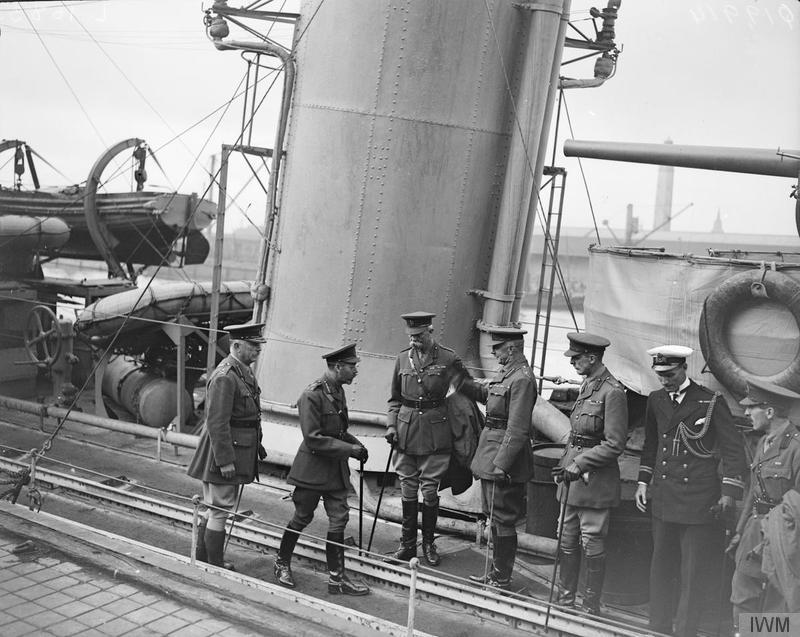
King George V about to disembark from the Royal Navy flotilla leader HMS Whirlwind at Calais, 5 August 1918. With him are Lieutenant-General George Henry Fowke, the Adjutant-General of the Expeditionary Force; Arthur Bigge, 1st Baron Stamfordham; Lieutenant-General Joseph Asser; Major Edward Gerald Thompson, the ADC to Field Marshal Haig; Captain Gush RN; and Rowland Baring, 2nd Earl of Cromer.

Asser retired from the army in July 1914 but returned to service on the outbreak of war that year. He served as a base commandant, as General Officer Commanding (GOC) Lines of Communication area, and as GOC of the British Troops in France and Flanders in 1919. For his First World War service he was mentioned in despatches, made a CB in February 1915, restored to the active list as a major general in June 1916 and further promoted to lieutenant general in December 1916 which became substantive in June 1919. He was awarded the Companion of the Order of the Bath in 1915, the Knight Commander of the Order of St Michael and St George in 191), the Russian Order of St Anne with crossed swords and the Belgian Order of the Crown.

== Post-war ==
Asser was Governor and Commander-in-Chief of Bermuda, a position he held from July 1922 until August 1927 during which time he was promoted to general in November 1926, and was immediately placed on half-pay. He was an aide-de-camp general to King George V, in succession to General Sir Alexander Godley, from May 1929 to 1930, the year in which he was placed on retired pay. He received the Knight Commander of the Royal Victorian Order in 1917, the Knight Commander of the Order of the Bath in 1924, the second class of the Order of Osmanieh, the second class of the Order of the Mejidie, the Order of the Sacred Treasure, the Order of Aviz, the French Croix de guerre, the Belgian Croix de guerre and was a Grand Officier of the Legion of Honour.

Asser lived at The Old Vicarage, Hambledon, Hampshire. He was a member of the Army and Navy Club and an honorary member of Phi Beta Kappa society at the College of William & Mary, Virginia. In Who's Who he listed his recreations as shooting, fishing and golf. He was married in 1901 to Leila, daughter of James Wotherspoon of New York; they had one daughter. He died on 4 February 1949.

Government offices
Preceded by Sir James Willcocks	Governor of Bermuda; 1922–1927	Succeeded by Sir Louis Bols
