= General Chapman =

General Chapman may refer to:

- Augustus A. Chapman (1805–1876), Virginia Militia brigadier general in the American Civil War
- Edward Chapman (British Army officer) (1840–1926), British Army general
- Frederick Chapman (British Army officer) (1815–1893), British Army general
- George Henry Chapman (1832–1882), Union Army brigadier general and brevet major general
- John Chapman (Australian Army officer) (1896–1963), Australian Army major general
- Leonard F. Chapman Jr. (1913–2000), U.S. Marine Corps general
- Stephen Chapman (British Army officer) (1776–1851), British Army lieutenant general

== See also ==
- Attorney General Chapman (disambiguation)
