= Governor Chapman =

Governor Chapman may refer to:

- Frederick Chapman (British Army officer) (1815–1893), Governor of Bermuda from 1867 to 1870
- Stephen Chapman (British Army officer) (1776–1851), Governor of Bermuda from 1832 to 1835
