= Arthur Leahy =

Irish colonel in the Royal Engineers

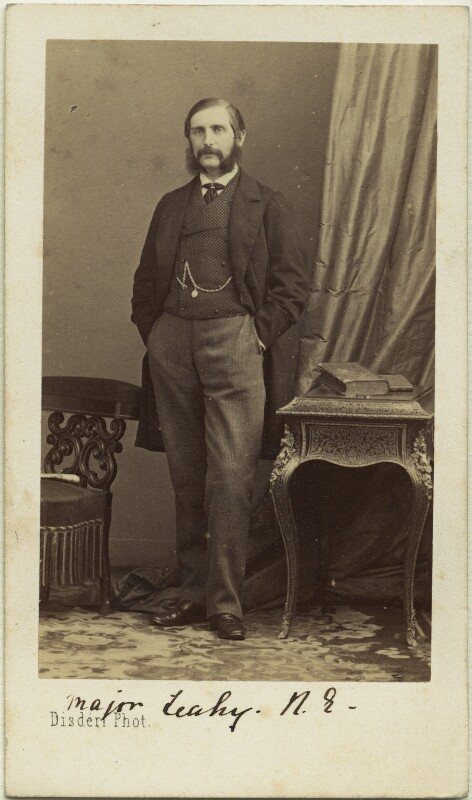
- Born: 5 August 1830
- Died: 18 July 1878 (aged 47); Southampton
- Occupation: Colonel in the Royal Engineers

Arthur Leahy (5 August 1830 – 18 July 1878) was an Irish colonel in the Royal Engineers.

== Early life and education ==
Leahy was the seventh son of John Leahy, esq., J.P., of South Hill, Killarney. He was born 5 August 1830, and educated at Corpus Christi Hall, Maidstone, and the Royal Military Academy, Woolwich.

== Military career ==
He obtained a commission as lieutenant in the Royal Engineers on 27 June 1848, and, after completing his military studies at Chatham, was quartered in Ireland until 1853, and after that at Corfu.

On the outbreak of the war with Russia in 1854, he joined the army at Varna and proceeded with it to the Crimea. He was present at the battles of Alma and Inkerman. During the early part of the siege he was acting adjutant, and in charge of the engineer park of the left attack under Major (later General Sir) Frederick Chapman. In managing the park and the engineer transport train he first had an opportunity of showing his characteristic energy and industry. As the winter set in Leahy was appointed deputy-assistant quartermaster-general for the royal engineers. In the 'Journal of the Siege Operations,' published by authority, Leahy is credited with invaluable services in providing for the comfort and proper maintenance of the engineer troops. He received the Crimean war medal with three clasps, the Sardinian medal, the Turkish war medal and the 5th class of the Medjidie.

From the Crimea he returned to Corfu in and became a second captain on 2 December. His brevet majority for service in the Crimea, which he received some time after, was antedated 8 December 1857. He returned home early in 1858, was stationed for a short time at Woolwich, and in June was appointed to the staff of the inspector-general of fortifications at the War Office. In 1864 he became assistant-director of works in the fortification branch of the War Office. When he went to the War Office, the defence of the home arsenals and dockyards had become a matter of urgency, and tie defence loan, the result of the royal commission on the defences of the United Kingdom of 1859, provided the necessary funds. The work thrown upon the fortification branch was enormous, and Leahy's share of it large. In addition to his regular work, he was a member of many committees, and in 1870 was secretary of that presided over by Lord Lansdowne on the employment of officers of royal engineers in the civil departments of the state.

Leahy was employed at the Paris Exhibition of 1867, and made three able reports, which were published, on military hospitals and barrack buildings, on field hospital equipment, and on military telegraphy and signalling. He became a brevet lieutenant-colonel on 29 November 1868. In July 1871 he was appointed instructor of field works at the School of Military Engineering at Chatham, and owing to his efforts the instruction in fieldworks and kindred subjects was made available not only for the whole regular army but also for the militia and volunteers, it was also due to his initiative that classes for pioneer sergeants of infantry were introduced, and he himself prepared the official manual for their instruction. He took considerable interest in the field park and its workshops, and brought them into a high state of efficiency. He was promoted to be regimental lieutenant-colonel 10 December 1873, and in March 1876 was sent to Gibraltar as second in command of the Royal Engineers. He was promoted brevet-colonel 1 October 1877.

== Death and personal life ==
In 1878 he was attacked by rock fever, was taken home, and died on 18 July 1878 at Netley Hospital, Southampton. Leahy was twice married, first in 1857 to Miss Tabuteau, by whom he had two children; and secondly to Miss E. J. Poynter, by whom he had five children. He was the author of a pamphlet on army reorganisation, 1868, 8vo.
