= French ship Commerce de Marseille =

Two ships of the French Navy have borne the name Commerce de Marseille ("Commerce of Marseille") in honour of the congregation of the merchants of Marseille:

- Commerce de Marseille (1785), a Téméraire-class ship of the line.
- Commerce de Marseille (1788), a 118-gun ship, lead ship of the Océan class.
