= Attorney General Chapman =

Attorney General Chapman may refer to:

- Henry Samuel Chapman (1803–1881), Attorney-General of Victoria
- Vickie Chapman (born 1957), Attorney-General of South Australia
