= Stephen Chapman (British Army officer) =

Lieutenant-general Sir Stephen Chapman CB
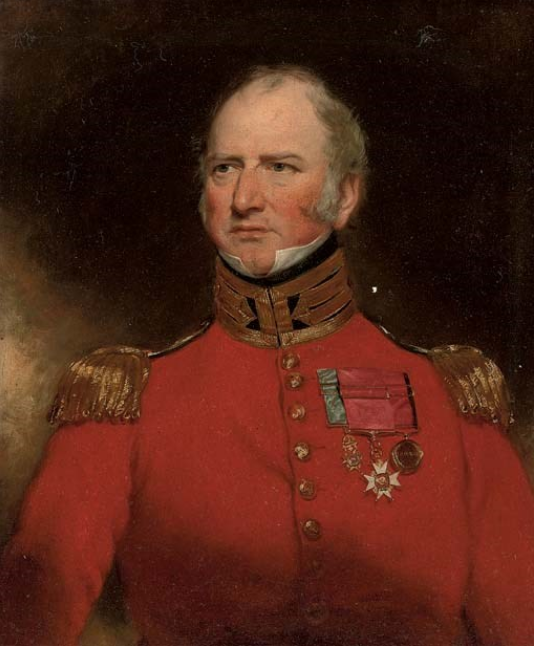
- Portrait by a follower of Sir Thomas Lawrence
- Born: 1776; Tainfield House, Taunton, Somerset
- Died: 6 March 1851 (aged 74–75); Tainfield House, Taunton, Somerset
- Relatives: Sir Frederick Chapman (nephew)
- Military career
- Allegiance: United Kingdom
- Branch: British Army
- Service years: 1793–1851
- Rank: Lieutenant-general
- Unit: Royal Engineers
- Commands: Governor of Bermuda
- Conflicts: French Revolutionary Wars; Anglo-Russian Invasion of Holland; Napoleonic Wars; Copenhagen Expedition; Peninsular War; Battle of Busaco
- Awards: Knight Bachelor

Lieutenant-general Sir Stephen Remnant Chapman CB , K.C.H.(26 April 1775 – 6 March 1851) was a British Army officer and colonial official who served in Gibraltar and also as Governor of Bermuda.

Stephen Chapman was born in Chatham, on 26 April 1775, he was the eldest son of General Richard Chapman (Royal Artillery) and Mary, the daughter of Stephen Remnant, from whom Chapman derived his middle name. He was baptized on 5 May 1775, his godparents were Captain John Carter and Sarah Remnant, his grandmother.

He was educated at the Royal Military Academy, Woolwich. The studies at the academy emphasized theoretical and practical instruction aimed at military engineering needs. The cadets learnt mathematics including algebra, geometry, trigonometry, and mechanics and these were applied directly to gunnery principles giving them an understanding of artillery. They also studied chemistry so they obtained an understanding of explosives and other materials. Their studies also dealt with fortifications which included drawing fortification plans, and surveying techniques to assess terrain and ground conditions, fostering skills in reconnaissance and site evaluation critical for defensive works.

Stephen Chapman received his commission as an ensign in the Royal Engineers on 18 September 1793.

The West Indies

Ensign Chapman was ordered to the West Indies in October 1795 to join the expedition to the Leeward Islands under the command of Sir Ralph Abercromby who was appointed commander-in-chief in the West Indies in late 1795.

Lt Chapman went to Portsmouth to join the fleet assembled under Rear Admiral Hugh Cloberry Christian which was to carry troops and supplies for the West Indies to fight the French. It is believed he was on the Commerce de Marseille, a massive former French three-decker that had been captured and converted into a British store-ship for the expedition. The fleet comprised around 200 ships which set sail from Spithead in 16 November but on the morning of 17 November 1795, the fleet was caught in a hurricane-force gale west of Portland. Reports from the time mention intense thunder and lightning occurring during the storm's peak.

Hundreds of men were lost as multiple ships, including the troop transports Piedmont, Catherine, and Venus, were wrecked on Chesil Beach in Dorset with the loss of hundreds of lives. These terrible gales were nicknamed "Christian's Gales". The Commerce de Marseille was so "badly shattered" and in such "disorder" that it nearly became a grave for its crew. The ship was carrying 800 barrels of gunpowder and it was hit by lightning, with a ball of fire rolling from cabin to cabin through the ship. Disaster was averted thanks to the exertions of Lt Chapman. The ship suffered severe structural damage, including its ports being stove in, and was forced to limp back to Portsmouth.

After returning to port for repairs, the fleet sailed again on 9 December but was driven back to Spithead by more storms after six weeks of being tossed about the English Channel.

In February 1796 Admiral William Cornwallis had been appointed to succeed Admiral Christian in command of the expedition to the West Indies. He hoisted his flag on the 100-gun HMS Royal Sovereign, which after repairs and regrouping, departed from Spithead on 1 March 1796. It seems that Ensign Chapman had been ordered to move his berth to the flagship, as it is mentioned he was with Cornwallis when shortly after leaving port, the Royal Sovereign was accidentally run down (collided with) by one of the troopships in the convoy, the Belisarius on 7 March 1796. The accident was reportedly caused by a heated dispute between the Master and the second mate of the Belisarius while "wearing ship" (turning the vessel away from the wind). Due to their lack of attention during this manoeuvre, the Belisarius fell across the path of the Royal Sovereign. The Royal Sovereign's jib-boom and bowsprit entangled the Belisarius's main-mast, striking the transport vessel amidships. The Belisarius was so severely damaged that it sank almost instantly. Approximately 110 people were saved, including Captain Barge, but nearly 200 soldiers and seamen were lost in the sinking.

The collision was so severe that the Royal Sovereign was left in a "sinking condition," with its hull badly damaged and taking on water. The crippled flagship was forced to struggle back toward the English coast. It spent four days in extreme distress in the vicinity of Mount's Bay, Cornwall, while the crew worked desperately to keep her afloat during which no pilot would venture out. Lt Chapman, who had some knowledge of this part of the coast because of previous work on surveys and soundings, personally navigated the ship into Mount's Bay.

The Royal Sovereign suffered significant structural damage from the collision, contributing to its "sinking condition" and forcing its return to Spithead on 14 March for repairs. However, when the Admiralty ordered him to immediately shift his flag to a smaller frigate (HMS Astrea) and continue to the West Indies, he refused, citing his poor health and the lack of accommodations for his rank on a frigate. He resigned his command, and as a result was court-martialled in April 1796, where he was censured but technically acquitted.

The fleet, which had been left at anchor in Spithead, was given back to Rear-admiral Hugh Cloberry Christian who made a third attempt to cross the Atlantic. He departed England on 20 March 1796, and successfully arrived with his squadron and transports at Carlisle Bay, Barbados on 21 April 1796, about a month later.

Admiral Christian then took over as commander-in-chief of the Leeward Islands station and, in coordination with Lieutenant-general Sir Ralph Abercromby, who arrived in Barbados on 17 March 1796, ahead of the main fleet, began the successful military campaign to recapture the French-held islands in the Caribbean.

Sir Ralph Abercromby knew that he needed to commence operations quickly before any sickness appeared amongst his troops and started decimating his strength. He immediately launched a series of offensive operations to restore British control in the Caribbean by starting with the capture of St. Lucia and St. Vincent from the French.

St Lucia 1796

The British fleet arrived off St. Lucia on 26 April 1796, and began landing troops the following day in different locations to secure beachheads and outposts, including at Longueville Bay, Choc Bay, and Anse La Baye.

The French forces, which included soldiers, formerly enslaved Africans, and free people of colour fighting for the French Republic, retreated to their main stronghold, the fortress of Morne Fortune. The British laid siege to the fort with assistance from seamen who hauled guns up the difficult terrain.

The company of artificers, under the command of Captain Hay, Royal Engineers, had landed on 26 April, and at once were told off for the duties of the siege. The officers of Engineers, which included Ensign Chapman, planned and directed the essential siege operations, specifically the construction of artillery batteries on strategic, elevated positions, including those deemed to be in "almost inaccessible" locations to capture the French stronghold.

In addition to the construction of some extensive batteries to act against Morne Fortuné, they superintended the formation of a communication by means of a new road from Choc Bay to the Morne.

After weeks of fighting, including a heavy loss for the British in an assault on the Vigie on 17 May. In In the last attack on the enemy's advanced posts at Morne Fortuné, a detachment of about twenty non-commissioned officers and men, under Lieutenant Fletcher, R.E., with handspikes, axes, and picks, rushed gallantly forward and formed a lodgement, which was rapidly converted into a battery of five 24-pounders to breach the body of the place. The exertions of this party greatly contributed to the success of the assault and to the fall of St Lucia. Lieutenant Fletcher was wounded, as also two rank and file.

By 24 May the English had pushed up to within 500 yards of the fort and the French garrison under General Goyrand capitulated on 24 May 1796. Around 2,000 French soldiers were taken prisoner and sent to Britain. Colonel John Moore, a key subordinate to Abercromby, was left in command of the island's garrison. The British lost 566 men during the campaign to take the island. Sir Ralph Abercromby relied heavily on his engineering staff for the success of the operation given the nature of the ground and other circumstances, the operations for the reduction of the fort were extraordinary and arduous, and the exertions of the engineers noteworthy. Sir Ralph noticed these efforts and conveyed his thanks to the Engineers and artificers for their good conduct and soldier like behaviour at the siege.

After the island's capture, engineers were tasked with repairing the captured fortifications and ensuring the island was secured for the subsequent British garrison. He acknowledged the combined effort of both land and naval forces in the general order issued after the victory.

It was during this expedition that Ensign Chapman met Lt Richard Fletcher (who later was Lieutenant-colonel Sir Richard Fletcher) who was a key engineer officer. Fletcher was wounded in the head by a musket-ball during the final assault on Morne Fortune in May 1796. He later served as the chief engineer in Dominica before returning to England. He also met Major Charles Shipley, who later became the commanding royal engineer for the Windward and Leeward Islands, and was instrumental in providing reports and engineering expertise regarding the defences of the various islands in the region around that time.

St Vincent

Leaving St. Lucia, Abercromby sailed for St. Vincent, where French forces and their Carib allies (known as the Black Caribs) had been resisting British control in the Second Carib War.

British troops landed on the evening of 8 June 1796. Abercromby swiftly executed an encircling movement to trap the insurgent forces at their base at Vigie Ridge. The Royal Engineers provided the technical expertise required to dislodge French Revolutionary forces and their Carib allies from their primary defensive position at Vigie Ridge. The Engineer's contributions were defined by the island's mountainous and "almost inaccessible" terrain, they planned and supervised the construction of artillery batteries on commanding heights and used four cannons and two howitzers to "batter" the principal enemy post at Vigie. The Engineer officers worked with the Royal Navy to move heavy ordnance up steep inclines. While the sailors' "ready resources" and labour were vital for hauling the guns, the Engineers directed the placement of these weapons to ensure they could effectively target French fortifications. The campaign involved a swift encircling movement to trap the insurgent forces. Engineers were responsible for identifying and clearing routes for troops to move through difficult overgrown jungle-type terrain to complete the investment of the French position.

The defence was obstinate, but the British successfully cut off the enemy's communications. The success of the engineering and artillery operations forced the French commander, Marinier, to surrender on 11 June 1796, and the Caribs surrendered four days later. The British took approximately 200 prisoners, with others escaping into the jungle. Following the surrender, the British deported the indigenous Caribs to Roatán, an island off the coast of Honduras. Following the capture, Abercromby transitioned to "reorganizing the defences" of the island, a task traditionally handled by the Royal Engineers to ensure the territory could withstand future counter-attacks.

Stephen Chapman was promoted to lieutenant on 20 November 1796.

Trinidad

Following Spain's alliance with Revolutionary France and her declaration of war on Britain in October 1796, Sir Ralph Abercromby decided to lead a major British expedition to seize Spanish-held islands of Trinidad and Puerto Rico in the Caribbean. Sir Ralph resolved to make an attempt on the island of Trinidad first and the expedition under his direct command and Admiral Harvey sailed accordingly from Martinique on 12 February 1797. To this force were attached Engineer officers and artificers under Major Charles Shipley. Lt Chapman was one of those in the expedition.

The Capture of Trinidad took place in February 1797. Abercromby, supported by a fleet under Rear-admiral Henry Harvey, invaded Trinidad on 17 February 1797. The Spanish fleet, trapped in Chaguaramas Bay and significantly undermanned, was scuttled or burned by the Spanish to prevent its capture. The island surrendered with almost no blood shed on 18 February. Abercromby appointed Thomas Picton as the first British Governor, marking the start of 165 years of British rule.

The Siege of San Juan, Puerto Rico (April 1797):

Encouraged by the easy victory in Trinidad, Abercromby turned his force of approximately 13,000 men toward Puerto Rico in April 1797. Unlike Trinidad, Puerto Rico was heavily fortified. Governor Ramón de Castro mobilized a diverse force of regular troops, local militia, and freed slaves who utilized effective guerrilla tactics against the British. The Royal Engineers, including Lt. Chapman, were tasked with overcoming the formidable Spanish defences that blocked General Sir Ralph Abercromby's advance toward the city. Their primary roles included the construction of artillery batteries on the east side of the city to bombard the forts of San Gerónimo and San Antonio. They were responsible for attempting to repair or bridge water crossings, such as the San Antonio Bridge, which had been destroyed by the Spanish to isolate the city from the British landing site at Cangrejos. They also had to manage the digging of trenches and "redoubts" to protect British infantry from heavy Spanish fire.

They constructed, two batteries, assisted by a working party of soldiers from the 14th Foot. One was for mortars and the other for guns. A large magazine abandoned by the enemy, was also partially converted into a battery for two mortars, but its completion was abandoned because the ordnance intended to arm the battery had been swamped in a morass in moving across the island.

Despite the engineers' efforts, the British batteries were placed too far from the main city walls to be effective, and the fire from the Spanish forts was far more precise and destructive. The failure can be explained by a critical lack of trained sappers and miners, forcing the Royal Engineers to rely on untrained infantry for labour. Facing a tenacious defence, superior Spanish artillery, and an "impregnable" fortress, after 13 days of unsuccessful bombardment and being unable to cross the inlets protected by Spanish engineer Ignacio Mascaró, Abercromby received news that his rear was threatened by a column of militia and soldiers advancing from the interior of the island so he call off the siege and ordered the retreat on 30 April 1797.

The British retreat and evacuation from the Siege of San Juan in April 1797 were managed in a coordinated and orderly fashion, despite being a clear failure of the expedition's objectives. The evacuation from the land-based positions back to the ships occurred under the cover of darkness on the night of 30 April. Spanish forces were reportedly surprised the next morning to find the British gone from the island. Abercromby successfully evacuated most of the artillery, stores, and four captured Spanish brass field pieces. However, a dozen damaged or unusable cannon were "spiked" and left behind, along with horses, munitions, and some camp equipment, which the Spanish forces found upon advancing. The re-embarkation was facilitated by Admiral Sir Henry Harvey's accompanying fleet of 68 vessels, which had provided support and blockaded the harbour during the siege. Once all troops were back aboard the fleet, the force sailed away on 2 May, retreating to Martinique to regroup and plan future operations.

General Sir Ralph Abercromby was occupied with colonial governance while he was in Martinique, which served as the primary British military headquarters in the Leeward Islands. Due to his poor health, he left the West Indies in July 1797 aboard the frigate Arethusa, arriving back in London by late August. Lt Chapman returned to England in 1798.

The Helder 1799

The Expedition to the Helder took place between August and November 1799, it was the Anglo-Russian invasion of Holland during the War of the Second Coalition. Its primary goals were to neutralize the Dutch (Batavian) fleet and restore the House of Orange by overthrowing the French-backed Batavian Republic. The Initial Landings took place on 27 August, a British force of 12,000 men under Sir Ralph Abercromby successfully landed at Callantsoog despite French-Dutch opposition.

Lt Chapman sailed in September 1799 on the frigate HMS Melpomone (HMS Melpomene, a 38-gun frigate commanded by Sir Charles Hamilton, was assigned to escort troop transports and high-ranking officers to the Dutch coast) together with Lt. General Sir Eyre Coote who was to command a brigade in the division under the Duke of York in the ongoing Anglo-Russian invasion of Holland.

After the Duke of York arrived to take supreme command, a joint attack was launched at Bergen on 19 September 1799, but it failed due to poor coordination between British and Russian columns.

On 2 October, the Battle of Alkmaar took place, it is also called the Second Battle of Bergen, and it was a costly tactical victory for the Allies, forcing a French retreat.

On 6 October the Battle of Castricum was fought, it was an indecisive but strategically disastrous engagement for the Allies. Faced with mounting disease, poor weather, and lack of local support, the Duke of York realized the position was untenable and opened up correspondence with his opposite commander.

As far as Lt Chapman was concerned, during the 1799 Expedition to the Helder, the Royal Engineers performed their standard duties of military engineering, which were complicated by the unique, difficult terrain of the Dutch coastal area. Their role primarily involved logistical support, infrastructure development, and siege warfare.

The Royal Engineers' were responsible for building and maintaining camps, ensuring proper drainage systems, and establishing roads for troop movement on the narrow strip of beach and soft sand dunes. While the campaign involved fluid battles rather than prolonged sieges against major fortresses, engineers were crucial for any required fortification and the construction of artillery positions in the field. Given the unfamiliar and difficult terrain, Royal Engineers were involved in mapping the area to support tactical planning for the generals, which was essential as the troops struggled with the lack of roads and numerous sand ridges.

The natural environment of North Holland made the engineers' work particularly challenging as the landscape was dominated by extensive, high sand dunes and soft ground, making large troop movements difficult and requiring engineering efforts to establish stable routes and positions. Added to that, the low-lying, flat Dutch countryside with its intricate network of drainage systems (canals and dikes) required the engineers to manage water flow and potentially build temporary bridges or crossings.

At the time, the Corps of Royal Engineers was an officer-only corps. The non-commissioned officers and privates who performed the manual labour were part of the Corps of Royal Military Artificers (later the Royal Sappers and Miners).

The unsuccessful fighting led to the Convention of Alkmaar being agreed on 18 October 1799, establishing an armistice and the terms for a peaceful withdrawal. The armistice allowed the Allied forces to evacuate unmolested in exchange for the release of 8,000 French and Dutch prisoners held in Britain. The Allies suffered approximately 18,000 casualties (killed, wounded, or captured) compared to 7,000 for the Franco-Batavian forces. The mission failed its goal of liberating Holland. By 19 November 1799, the evacuation was officially completed. General Pulteney was reportedly the last British officer to leave the peninsula. Lt. Chapman, who had been wounded was evacuated with the other injured officers.

The Red Sea Expedition

Soon after his recovery, in October 1800 he found himself in India, where he was assigned to assist Sir David Baird in an incredible expedition to the Red Sea, which was being planned in late 1800.

In April 1801, Major-general Sir David Baird led a supporting Anglo-Indian expeditionary force from Bombay to Egypt to assist the main expedition led by Sir Ralph Abercromby in the expulsion of French forces in Egypt. Lt Chapman was promoted to 2nd captain on 18 April 1801.

Sir David Baird's expeditionary force to the Red Sea consisted of approximately 5,000 troops, including about 3,000 Indian soldiers, and the engineering component was mainly composed of officers from the Indian (Bengal and Madras) Engineers and a small staff of Royal Engineers from the main British Army. The force departed Bombay on 9 April 1801. Baird arrived at Jeddah on 17 May and landed at the port of Kosseir (Al-Qusayr) on the Red Sea on 8 June 1801. From Kosseir, Baird led his army on a gruelling 167-mile march across the desert to Qena on the Nile with extraordinarily low number of losses being the result of meticulous planning, which ensured that soldiers did not die of thirst. The key to this success was a well-organized water supply chain established by the expedition's command, including the Royal Engineer officers. The route chosen to cross this part of the Eastern Desert had been a trade path for millennia, used since Pharaonic and Ptolemaic times, and as such the path featured fortified watering points, or wells, known as hydreumata, at specific intervals. Before the main army marched, advance parties secured and possibly improved these existing wells, it may be that Engineer officers were part of these parties, and Lt Chapman was one of them, but we have not got confirmation of this. The various posts along the route were equipped with cisterns that held water supplies. The army was likely broken down into smaller, manageable detachments that moved in phases to avoid overwhelming a single water source. Camels and local transport were utilized to move supplies, including water casks, between the wells.

From Qena, on the Nile, there followed a 253-mile advance to Cairo. By the time Baird reached Cairo in late June 1801, the French garrison had already surrendered to General Hutchinson. Baird's Indian contingent joined the main British force in time to cooperate in the final siege and capture of Alexandria (17 August – 2 September 1801). The expedition was a remarkable logistical feat, successfully transporting an army from India to the Mediterranean theatre for the first time. It effectively neutralized French aspirations of using Egypt as a base to threaten British interests in India.

Yorkshire, England

In 1803, he was back in England, under orders of the Earl of Mulgrave. He was attached to the "Yorkshire District" which was a specific military administrative command of the British Army, and the Royal Engineers stationed there were primarily focused on coastal defence and the maintenance of internal military infrastructure during the heightened invasion scares of the Napoleonic Wars. The Royal Engineers in this district acted as the technical staff for the commanding general.

Captain Chapman was ordered to place the citadel of Hull in a suitable state of defence. The primary concern was the protection of the Humber Estuary and the East Yorkshire coast. He was tasked with surveying and maintaining batteries at strategic points like Hull. The threat of French privateers and the potential for a larger invasion fleet necessitated constant reconnaissance and the strengthening of earthworks. He completed the task and was thanked by the Duke of York and promoted to 1st captain, gazetted on 2 March 1805.

The Yorkshire District was under the supreme command of Lieutenant-general Sir David Baird, who held the post from 1806 until he departed for the Copenhagen Expedition in mid-1807. He took Captain Chapman with him as part of his division, so Stephen Chapman took part in the 1807 Expedition to Copenhagen, which was a pre-emptive British naval and land strike designed to seize the Danish fleet before it could fall under the control of Napoleon.

Battle of Copenhagen 1807

Following the Treaty of Tilsit, the British government received intelligence of a secret agreement between France and Russia to force neutral Denmark into the Continental System. Fearing Napoleon would use the formidable Danish navy—roughly 20 ships of the line and 17 frigates—to support an invasion of Britain, Foreign Secretary George Canning ordered the expedition

The British dispatched over 25,000 troops and approximately 400 ships, including 25 ships of the line, under Admiral James Gambier and General Lord Cathcart. British troops landed north of Copenhagen on 16 August 1807. On 29 August, Sir Arthur Wellesley (the future Duke of Wellington) won his first European victory at the Battle of Køge, defeating a Danish militia force and completing the encirclement of the capital.

Royal Engineer officers reported that Copenhagen's primary defences were too strong for a direct assault, recommending a regular siege and bombardment instead. Secure control of elevated areas like Windmill Hill was necessary to place the mortar batteries and Congreve rocket launchers. Captain Chapman was assigned the task of siting and constructing the batteries at a wooded area known as Classen's Garden which contained several large windmills and as a result was nicknamed by the British as "Windmill Hill".

While Captain Chapman was supervising those building tasks, a critical skirmish took place on 31 August 1807, Danish troops launched a major "sortie" from the city's western gates. Their goal was to destroy the British advanced works and batteries being constructed near these windmills. The engagement involved intense close-quarters fighting. The 95th Rifles and the 92nd Gordon Highlanders were heavily involved in repelling the Danish attack which was successfully driven off chasing the Danish forces back into the city, and securing the "Windmill Hill" area. Following the skirmish, the construction of "parallels" and zigzag trenches that moved the British guns closer to the city walls continued and the Royal Engineers and artillery were able to finalize the placement of the land batteries that would soon begin the devastating bombardment of the capital.

When the guns were in situ, a letter requesting the Danes surrender their ships was sent to the King. The Danes refused to surrender their fleet, so the British launched a devastating three-day bombardment (2–5 September). This was one of the first major uses of Congreve rockets in European warfare. Over 1,000 buildings were destroyed, including the spire of the Church of Our Lady.

Captain Chapman personally directed the works and batteries of the attack against the citadel, and afterwards he was thanked personally by Sir David Baird who commanded the Second Division, and invited to attend him into town when Copenhagen surrendered.

Back in England

In December 1807 he was back in command of the Engineers in the Yorkshire district, dealing with the logistical challenge of housing thousands of troops he had to oversee the repair and expansion of barracks in key towns such as York, Hull, and Beverley. The engineers in the district also continued the vital work of military mapping. This was part of a broader national effort (which led to the Ordnance Survey) to ensure the Army had accurate topographical maps for moving troops and artillery through the Yorkshire terrain in the event of an invasion.

Peninsular War

In March 1809, with only 48 hours’ notice he was ordered to embark for Lisbon and was Commanding Engineer in Portugal until the arrival of Lieutenant Colonel Fletcher with Sir Arthur Wellesley (later the Duke of Wellington) arrived back in Lisbon to take command of the British forces on 22 April 1809, when he became Executive Engineer.

Wellesley's immediate focus was to expel Marshal Soult's French forces from Oporto. The engineers were instrumental in supporting this rapid advance, particularly in planning river crossings and maintaining infrastructure. Captain Chapman constructed defence works to secure the passage of the Tagus below Santarem, and he also constructed most of the works for the immediate defence of the city of Lisbon, when the entire Corps of Portuguese Engineers, including Generals and Colonels placed under his command.

Sir Arthur Wellesley (Wellington) knew that the French would pursue him south from Oporto and try to destroy him in a pitched battle through tier superiority in numbers. He devised the initial strategic plan for the of defence of Lisbon, discussing a detailed plan with Lieutenant-colonel Sir Richard Fletcher on where the defences should be located, based on pre-existing topographic maps by Portuguese Major Neves da Costa. Captain Chapman, along with other officers began working on these plans while Sir Arthur marched north and beat the French at Oporto on 12 May 1809.

During the Talavera campaign of July 1809, Captain Chapman was employed near Lisbon preparing defences against potential French advances. He was asked to use his engineering expertise to strengthen key positions that would prove key to a controlled withdrawal should the French prove too strong in Spain and pursue Wellesley's army back to Portugal.

Sir Arthur Wellesley (Wellington) provided Colonel Fletcher with a detailed memorandum in October 1809 discussing where the Lisbon defences should be located. They used the topographic maps by Portuguese Major Neves da Costa to trace two main defensive lines and a final redoubt defensive position in case re-embarkation was necessary. The specific design of the individual forts and defensive positions was left to the engineers to plan and implement, adapting to the local terrain. Lieutenant-colonel Sir Richard Fletcher, was assisted by a small, dedicated team of British Royal Engineer officers, including Captain Chapman, along with four Portuguese Army engineers and two officers from the King's German Legion.

Construction of the "lines" began in November 1809 in complete secrecy and was completed in a year. The work was done in such secrecy that the French and even the British government had no idea these defensive works were being constructed. The engineers' work went beyond simply designing and building forts on the first and second lines of Torres Vedras defence. They oversaw the construction of 152 interlinking fortifications (redoubts), which mounted 648 cannons and could be manned by 40,000 troops. Engineers directed the scarping of hillsides to create sheer precipices, dammed rivers to create artificial lakes, and cleared all vegetation to deny cover to an attacking force and ensure clear lines of fire. They built new roads to enable the rapid movement of British troops and artillery between the different lines of defence, allowing for quick reinforcement of any threatened point. They established a sophisticated semaphore signalling system that could transmit a message across the length of the Lines in just seven minutes.

Captain Chapman worked on the design and construction of the defences of St Julian to cover the final embarkation should the Lines fail to hold back the French. He was the chief assistant of Colonel Fletcher in the design and building of the fortifications, his thorough knowledge of the ground made his co-operation invaluable. Chapman directed the erection of a telegraph station at Celorico, enhancing communication lines for the allied forces. Colonel Fletcher speaks of his services in the very highest terms (Wellington Supplementary Despatches, vi. 537).

The actual manual labour was performed by thousands of Portuguese civilians and militia, supervised by the engineers. This massive undertaking of military engineering proved to be an "impregnable citadel" that completely halted the French invasion under Marshal Masséna in October 1810.

In 1810, Captain Stephen Remnant Chapman was instructed by Wellington to survey and map a piece of ground where he might make a stand and fight the French should they pursue him from the North. Chapman's expertise in terrain analysis and surveying was fundamental to Wellington's defensive strategy, and he had identified the Serra do Buçaco—a steep, nine-mile granite ridge—as "the finest defensive position in Europe". Having chosen his battlefield, Wellington ordered his engineers, led by Chapman, to construct a lateral communications road along the reverse slope of the ridge. This would allow Allied troops to move quickly and unseen between different points along the 16 km-long line to repel French attacks as they developed.

As the campaign progressed and Wellington was forced to retire south, pressed by Massena's French forces, he reached his chosen battlefield, Bussaco. Here, Captain Chapman played a crucial role during the Battle of Bussaco as the Commanding Royal Engineer (CRE) on the field.

Captain Chapman posted the army divisions that formed the left wing on the field and he was specifically praised for his leadership in positioning the Allied artillery and fortifying defensive positions, which were instrumental in repelling Marshal Masséna's head-on assaults on 27 September 1810.

Chapman's work at Bussaco was so significant that he was mentioned in dispatches by Wellington. The despatch was published in the London Gazette of Monday 15 October 1810.

Captain Chapman was rewarded with the Army Gold Medal for Bussaco, he was given the brevet rank of major, and he was recommended to the master general of the ordnance in Woolwich. Towards the close of 1810 he was appointed, by Lord Mulgrave, the master-general of the ordnance, to the important office of secretary to the master-general (Wellington Despatches, iv. 470). Wellington did yet more for him, for after repeated solicitation he secured his promotion to the rank of major, antedated to the day of the battle of Bussaco.

Recall to England

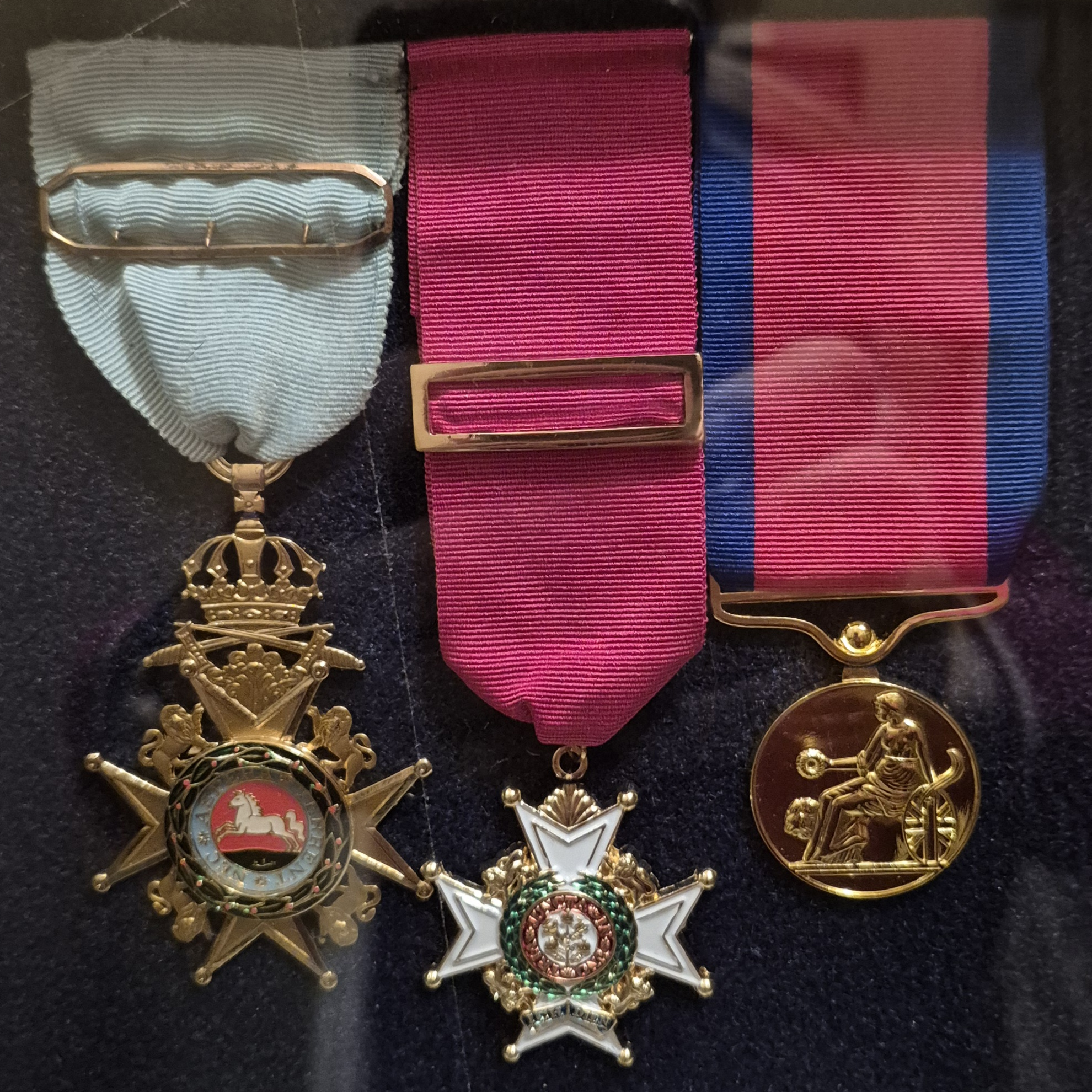
Medals-KCH, CB, Army Gold Medal

In 1811 he was recalled to England and on 26 April 1812 was promoted to lieutenant colonel (brevet) in the army and appointed Secretary to the Master-General of the Ordnance . This role involved overseeing bureaucratic operations related to military supplies, fortifications, and ordnance management, marking his transition to influential non-combat duties. On 21 July 1813 he obtained his promotion to lieutenant-colonel in the Royal Engineers. With the end of the war against France he was made a Companion of the Order of the Bath. He continued to fill the office of secretary to the master-general of the Ordnance until his promotion to the rank of colonel on 29 July 1825.

Gibraltar

From 1825 to 1831 he was posted to Gibraltar, to act as Colonial Secretary. This advancement reflected his growing expertise in military administration, paving the way for further colonial responsibilities. His duties involved assisting the governor, which at the time was Sir George Don, in managing civilian affairs, including local governance, policy implementation, and coordination between civil and military authorities in the strategically vital territory. His service in Gibraltar saw him work on some broader reforms which tried to ease tensions between military priorities and civilian development. One of the tasks was the preparation for the 1830 Charter of Justice that restructured judicial and policing systems to better serve the growing civilian population.

Life in the garrison town had a social flair to it. General life for the elite revolved around the Garrison Library (founded in 1793) and the Exchange and Commercial Library (founded in 1817). Newspapers frequently advertised balls, theatrical performances by the "Amateur Dramatic Club," and concerts, which were the primary entertainment for officers and the growing merchant class. The Gibraltar Chronicle regularly reported on royal birthdays and anniversaries, which were marked by military parades on the Alameda Parade and grand banquets hosted by the Lieutenant-governor of Gibraltar.

Public Infrastructure was improved by the Lieutenant-governor, Sir George Don's urban reforms, which included the introduction of street lighting and the completion of the Cathedral of the Holy Trinity which was begun in 1825 and completed in 1832.

In 1828 Gibraltar suffered a catastrophic yellow fever outbreak that killed over 1,600 people. For the first time, authorities used "fever passes" (immunity certificates). Those who had survived previous outbreaks were allowed to move freely, while others were forced into a massive encampment on the Neutral Ground (the area between the Rock and Spain) for four months. The Chronicle and medical journals reported on a temporary "wooden town" of 100 houses built on the isthmus to house the non-immune population, patrolled daily by police to prevent the disease's spread.

Maritime notices in the newspapers showed a transition from traditional sailing ships to the increasing presence of steamships (the first arrived in 1823), shifting the local economy toward coaling and victualling.

In response to port-related crimes and the need for civilian order, the Gibraltar Police Force was established in 1830—just one year after London's Metropolitan Police. Early reports detailed their efforts to manage the thousands of sailors and diverse civilians passing through the port.

In 1831, in London, King William IV knighted him, and gave him the badge of the Royal Guelphic Order (Knight Commander of Hannover) and appointed governor and commander in chief of the Bermuda or Somers Islands with the rank of major-general at Bermuda only; dated 28 October 1831.

Governor of Bermuda

Sir Stephen Chapman and Lady Chapman left for Bermuda around 14 October 1931 on the merchant ship Crawford Davidson, and upon arrival took office as governor, taking up residence in the "new" Government House called Mount Langton that was erected in 1820 on Pembroke hill, and served as a suitable residence for governors into the early 1880s. He served in Bermuda from his arrival in 1831 to 1839 and during this period, life in Bermuda was defined by a momentous social revolution and significant administrative stability under the governorship of Sir Stephen Remnant Chapman.

The 1833 British Slavery Abolition Act took effect across the empire on 1 August 1834, and it required freed people to serve as "apprentices" until 1838 or 1840. Unlike most other British colonies that implemented a multi-year "apprenticeship" system which was in effect a continued existence of forced labour, in Bermuda, under Chapman's guidance, the local Assembly decided for immediate and full emancipation.

The Bill was signed by Governor Chapman on 10 February 1834, and it proclaimed the immediate freeing of Bermuda's enslaved population on 1 August. The bill stated in part that "... that all and every persons who, on the first day of August 1834 shall be holden in slavery within these Islands shall upon, and from and after the said first day of August 1834, become and be to all intents and purposes free and discharged of and from all manner of slavery, shall be absolutely and forever manumitted, and that the children thereafter to be born to any such persons and the offspring of such children, shall in like manner be free from their birth; and that from and after the said first day of August... slavery shall be, and is hereby utterly and forever abolished and declared unlawful in these, his Majesty’s islands of Bermuda" (Public Record Office, London, CO/37/94.)

This meant that approximately 4,000 to 5,000 enslaved people became free overnight. While the transition was peaceful and avoided widespread unrest, it created immediate economic strains as the newly freed population had to find independent livelihoods.

To maintain the existing power structure, the local Assembly substantially increased property qualifications for voting. Governor Chapman reported to London that immediately following emancipation, only 34 freed Black Bermudians qualified to vote.

Bermuda had an essentially maritime economy. The Bermudians were expert shipbuilders, using the native Bermuda cedar to create fast, sturdy vessels. Life for many revolved around the salt trade in the Turks Islands, whaling, and maritime merchant trade.

With the abolition of slavery, agriculture on the island stagnated, the newly freed Bermudians largely neglected farming, viewing it as "beneath them" as they associated working the land with being a slave. During Chapman's governorship this attitude was persistent. It was not until his successor, William Reid (arrived 1839), that a major push for agricultural reform and "ploughing competitions" began.

As Governor, Sir Stephen Remnant Chapman utilized his engineering background and administrative experience from Gibraltar to stabilize the colony. He oversaw improvements to infrastructure and public health, despite the economic challenges of a post-slavery society.

Relations with the local House of Assembly were often strained, as he had to balance governmental directives from London with the interests of local white landowners, particularly regarding the funding of emancipation-related measures. The population was a complex mix of the white ruling class, the newly freed Black majority, and approximately 1,500 British convicts housed in prison "hulks" at the Dockyard.

This era saw the rise of Friendly Societies and lodges within the Black community, which provided a vital social safety net paying for pensions and education that the colonial government did not yet provide.

General Chapman is credited with managing one of the smoothest transitions to a free society in the British Empire, earning a reputation for a fair and pragmatic approach.

Bermuda was a strategic hub for the Royal Navy and as a result it needed adequate infrastructure. The construction of the Royal Naval Dockyard on Ireland Island was in full swing, largely utilizing convict labour shipped from Britain and Ireland. There were significant problems with the convict labourers in Bermuda between 1832 and 1839, primarily relating to appalling living conditions on the prison hulks, frequent disease outbreaks, and various forms of resistance. The primary issue was the use of decommissioned naval vessels, known as "hulks," as prisons. These were widely condemned as "dens of infamy and pollution" and were unfit for a tropical climate.

The crowded and unsanitary conditions, combined with the island's humidity and heat, led to frequent and deadly epidemics of diseases, particularly yellow fever and respiratory problems. A particularly severe yellow fever epidemic occurred in October 1837 with a very high mortality rate particularly among the British military and the convict labourers in the hulks. Medical records from the Royal Naval Hospital for this period indicate a "nasty epidemic... with a very high mortality rate" though precise overall casualty figures for this specific outbreak are not available. Doctors at the time were powerless against yellow fever, as the mode of transmission (via the Aedes aegypti mosquito) was not understood until the early 20th century. They attempted public health measures that involved relocation to higher ground or tent camps to avoid "bad air" (miasma theory), but the true cause remained elusive. Treatments were limited to supportive care, rest, and fluids, though aggressive and often ineffective methods like bloodletting were still sometimes used.

For the convicts, the hard labour itself was dangerous. Many convicts were injured in the dockyards, while quarrying white limestone caused some to go blind or suffer permanent eye damage from the sun's glare. Despite being forbidden, convicts could obtain spirits through intermediaries, which led to health problems (alcohol withdrawal), carelessness at work, and insubordination. The poor conditions and harsh treatment led to frequent outbreaks of unrest and rebellious behaviour.

Convicts engaged in various forms of resistance, including both active and passive methods. They would work slowly, feign sickness, and refuse to answer questions, or actively assault overseers. Some convicts attempted escapes by stealing boats and trying to reach America, though these efforts usually failed. Tensions over work, religion, and alcohol consumption often escalated into fights between prisoners, their overseers, and guards. The convict labourers, who were mainly white and viewed by administrators as a lower class of worker, worked alongside enslaved people until 1834, and after that with free Black workers, and soldiers. Officials were particularly wary of the "intermixing" of different classes and races, fearing alliances that might alter the island's power balance.

Governor Sir Stephen Chapman and other officials were aware of the problems, however the government in England thought that the severity of the reports from the prison chaplains and medical officers was exaggerated and not a great deal was done to improve the conditions of convict labourers. The system was eventually phased out, and the use of hulks in Bermuda ended in 1863, with convicts then transported to Australia or returned to England.

On 28 April 1835, Sir Stephen left Bermuda due to Illness, his deputy, A.G.Hunt was acting governor for the time being. Sir Stephen went to New York, on HM Brig Scylla under Commander Carpenter. There he took the Packet ship Caledonia, Master Graham, to Liverpool on 1 May 1835. He recovered from his illness and a few months later was back in Bermuda.

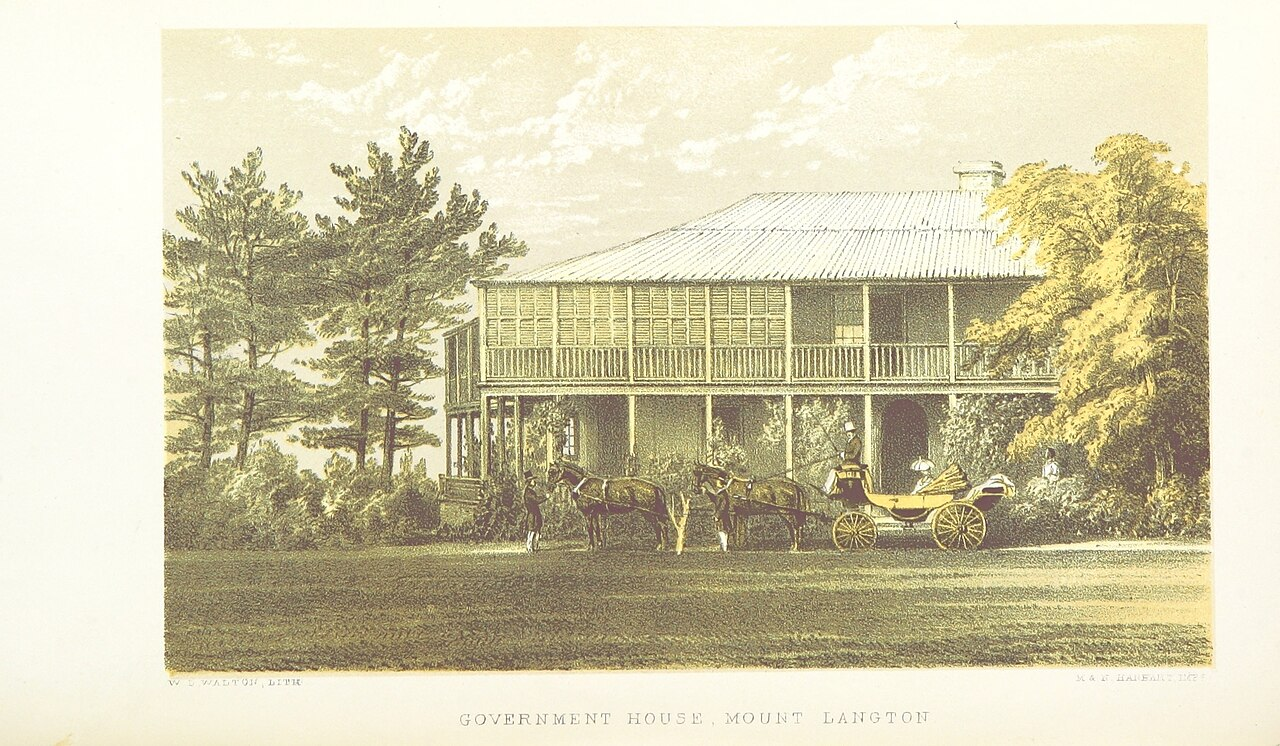
Sir Stephen and Lady Chapman's Residence in Bermuda 1835

On 27 May 1836, Sir Stephen and Lady Chapman gave a grand entertainment in Government House, Mount Langton. The rooms were crowded and the dancing and entertainment went on till daylight. Supper was served for 300 guests and toasts were drunk to King William IV, and to Sir Stephen and Lady Chapman. The supper room was a spacious apartment specially raised for the occasion and sumptuously decorated had the Royal Standard adorning the ceiling.

He was promoted to rank of major general on 10 January 1837.

At this time, Upper and Lower Canada were thrown into turmoil from 1837 to 1838, when insurgents mounted rebellions in each colony against the Crown and the political status quo. The revolt in Lower Canada was the more serious and violent of the two and it was suppressed by force. Punitive measures against those involved ranged from execution or transportation to penal colonies such as Tasmania and Australia, to imprisonment and banishment. One of the more unusual sanctions was an ordinance passed in July 1838 by the Special Council of Lower Canada, under the auspices of Governor-general Lord Durham, which authorized the banishment of eight captured Patriote leaders to the British colony of Bermuda. This was intended to remove influential agitators without resorting to executions or long prison terms.

Eight Canadian prisoners of note were sent to Bermuda in exile aboard HMS Vestal in early July 1838. Although the banishment was meant as punishment, upon arrival at Bermuda the eight men were initially confined but not treated as typical convicts. The presence of these men in Bermuda posed a vexing problem for Governor Chapman, just as it had done for Durham in Lower Canada. Sir Stephen and his council had to determine, what restraints were necessary to prevent the Patriotes’ return to Lower Canada. The governor and the Executive Council of Bermuda, composed of eight men, met at Government House on 25 July 1838, to debate the fate of these "worthies." The minutes of the Executive Council reveal details of the rhetoric behind the 1837 rebellion by the prisoners aboard the Vestal. It didn't do much to influence the discussion in Bermuda. Rather, it was the "parole of honour" that the Patriotes had signed before departing Quebec that received the most attention. Councillors in Bermuda expressed concern that it ascribed a social and political meaning to the "honour" of these men that could not, and should not, be accorded to those confined to the convict hulks. Chapman sought the advice of John Harvey Darrell, the attorney general and former mayor of Hamilton, and Duncan Stewart, the solicitor general, for their opinion.

Darrell and Stewart presented their legal opinion to Chapman on 26 July 1838. Both were convinced that the governor did not have authority to place any restrictions upon the Patriotes "with a view to their safe custody [in Bermuda]." Because the men had not been charged with treason or felony in Lower Canada and had been transported by the Special Council, which held no "sufficient legal effect in Bermuda," Darrell and Stewart determined that "these persons do not come within the description of convict felons … to be kept at hard labour on the public works here." Darrell and Stewart further declared transportation to be an imperial concern, as only those men "specially selected" by the Secretary of State for the Home Department were to be received aboard Bermuda's convict hulks. On 27 July 1838, the council voted to endorse Darrell's and Stewart's findings. The council decided that, since the Patriotes had arrived under "peculiar circumstances," they should "come under some stipulation for their movements." Sir Stephen and his council decided that they would use the concept of "honour" to deal with these men.

On the afternoon of Saturday, 28 July 1838, Nelson, Bouchette, Viger, Marchesseault, Gauvin, Goddu, DesRivières, and Masson signed their parole of honour to Governor Chapman, thy promised to behave and "not go or travel beyond such limits by land or by water, within the said islands of Bermuda." They then stepped off the Vestal, within sight of the convict hulks, and marched, shackle-free, through a crowd of free black and white Bermudians who had gathered to witness their landing. They were granted a degree of movement within the colony and relatively comfortable conditions compared with other transported prisoners. These "Canadian Exiles" as they became known, rented a small cottage on a hill to while away their banishment.

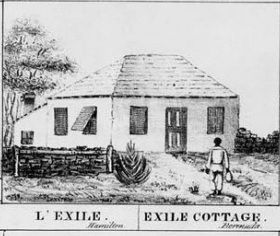
Cottage rented by Canadian exiles in Bermuda

The eight Patriotes sent to Bermuda were all figures associated with the reform and rebellion movement in Lower Canada (present-day Québec). Contemporary records and later historical research identify them as:

Wolfred Nelson (1791–1863): A physician, prominent Patriote leader, and veteran of the Battle of Saint-Denis. After returning from Bermuda and being pardoned, he later became mayor of Montreal and a member of the Legislature.

Robert-Shore-Milnes Bouchette: A lawyer and political activist involved in the Patriote cause. He was one of the group confederated with Nelson during their transportation and later documented parts of the journey.

Rodolphe DesRivières (sometimes spelled Des Rivières) : A participant in the rebellion whose life was tied up with the political activism of the period.

Henri Alphonse Gauvin: A doctor and active member of the Fils de la Liberté ("Sons of Liberty") group. Historical records suggest he died in Bermuda, likely from illness contracted there.

Siméon Marchesseault (Simon Marchessault): Another activist caught up in the suppression. He is recorded as having been separated from his family upon departure.

Luc-Hyacinthe Masson: Part of the contingent; like the others, he later reintegrated into society after returning.

Toussaint (or Toussaint-Hubert) Goddu (or Goddu): A veteran of the rebellion and one of the exiled Patriotes.

Bonaventure Viger: A well-known Patriote who had previously been involved in reform politics and who later returned to Canada.

Governor Chapman reported the situation to the government in London, which led to a debate in Parliament. The "exile" lasted just over four months before the British Parliament disallowed the Bermuda banishment ordinance of these people. They were informed of this and freed of their parole, which meant they were then free to return home which they did. In November 1838 the Persevere set sail for North America with the eight newly freed Patriotes on board. Back in Canada many resumed political and professional careers, for example Wolfred Nelson became a respected politician and municipal leader. Their story is an interesting example of how British colonial authorities dealt with dissent in the early Victorian era, while trying to punish rebellion they did not want to create martyrs, so they inadvertently giving these men a strange interlude in Bermuda before they returned to help shape the future of Canada.

The last two years as governor were busy with the administration of the colony. Sir Stephen continued his correspondence with the Admiralty regarding the insalubriousness of the hulks and the terrible conditions the convicts had to live in. He also continued overseeing the maintenance and construction of fortifications and the dockyard. He was recalled to England in June 1839, and he passed the governorship to Sir William Reid. Sir Stephen and his wife sailed to New York and then over to England. They were fortunate to miss a major hurricane that struck Bermuda directly on 11–12 September 1839. It is one of the earliest well-documented hurricanes in Bermudian history and is often called Reid's Hurricane, after Sir William Reid, the governor. The storm surge reached an estimated 11 ft (about 3.3 m) above normal tide levels. Thousands of trees were uprooted, and many homes were damaged or lost their roofs. Boats were carried inland by waves and surge. Roads were blocked by fallen trees and other debris. Remarkably, no deaths were reported, despite extensive property damage.

Later years

Sir Stephen and Lady Chapman returned to England in late 1839. Hereafter he chose not to depart the country again, effectively retiring from active public and colonial service. He settled in his father's house, Tainfield House, located near Taunton in Somerset.

He was advanced to lieutenant-general. on 9 November 1846.

In 1850, Chapman was appointed colonel commandant of the Royal Engineers, a prestigious honorary role overseeing the corps' traditions and leadership. He died at Tainfield House, Somerset on 6 March 1851. He was buried in the churchyard of St. Mary's Church in Kingston St Mary, Somerset.

He was the uncle of the senior Royal Engineers officer, Sir Frederick Chapman.
