= Frederick Chapman (British Army officer) =

General Sir Frederick Chapman GCB
- Born: 16 August 1815; Demerara, British Guiana
- Died: 13 June 1893 (aged 77); Grosvenor Square, London
- Relatives: Sir Stephen Remnant Chapman (uncle)
- Military career
- Allegiance: United Kingdom
- Branch: British Army
- Service years: 1835–1881
- Rank: General
- Commands: Royal Engineers
- Conflicts: Crimean War
- Awards: Knight Grand Cross of the Order of the Bath

General Sir Frederick Edward Chapman GCB (16 August 1815 – 13 June 1893) was a senior British Army officer and colonial official who served as Governor of Bermuda and Chief Royal Engineer.

Chapman was the only son of Richard Chapman and a nephew of Sir Stephen Remnant Chapman. He was born in Demerara, British Guiana and educated at the Royal Military Academy, Woolwich. He was commissioned as a second lieutenant into the Royal Engineers on 18 June 1835. He served in Portsmouth and Woolwich, before being deployed to the West Indies in November 1837. He returned to England in February 1842. Until February 1846 he served with in the London District before working with the British forces in the United States of the Ionian Islands. He returned home in October 1851, and did duty at Chatham until the beginning of 1854. He became brevet colonel on 2 November 1855.

Upon the outbreak of the Crimean War, Chapman was attached to the 1st Division, commanded by Prince George, Duke of Cambridge, as senior engineer officer. He took part in the Battle of the Alma and was mentioned in dispatches of 28 September 1854, taking command of engineering operations during the Siege of Sevastopol. He was present at the Battle of Inkerman and was mentioned in dispatches on 11 November 1854, 23 June 1855 and 9 September 1855. On 5 July 1855 he was made a Companion of the Order of the Bath and received honours from several other foreign governments, including being made an officer third class of the Order of the Medjidie. He was awarded a pension by the British government for distinguished service on 23 November 1858. On 8 April 1856 Chapman was appointed as the Chief Royal Engineer in the London District, before transferring to Aldershot in September 1857. On 1 April 1859 he was promoted to regimental lieutenant-colonel. From 1 September 1860 he served as deputy adjutant-general of Royal Engineers at Horse Guards for five years. He was made a Knight Commander of the Order of the Bath on 13 March 1867 and on 8 April he was appointed governor and commander-in-chief of Bermudas. On 1 July 1870 he resigned this position and accepted the appointment of Inspector-General of Fortifications and Director of Works at the War Office.

On 2 June 1877 Chapman was made a Knight Grand Cross of the Order of the Bath, and was promoted to general on 1 October that year. He retired from the army on 1 July 1881.

Military offices
Preceded by Sir John William Gordon	Inspector-General of Fortifications and Director of Work; 1870–1875	Succeeded by Sir Lintorn Simmons
Political offices
Preceded by Arnold Thompson	Governor of Bermuda; 1867-1870	Succeeded by W. F. Brett
