= Verein KlimaSeniorinnen Schweiz v. Switzerland =

European Court of Human Rights case

KlimaSeniorinnen v. Switzerland
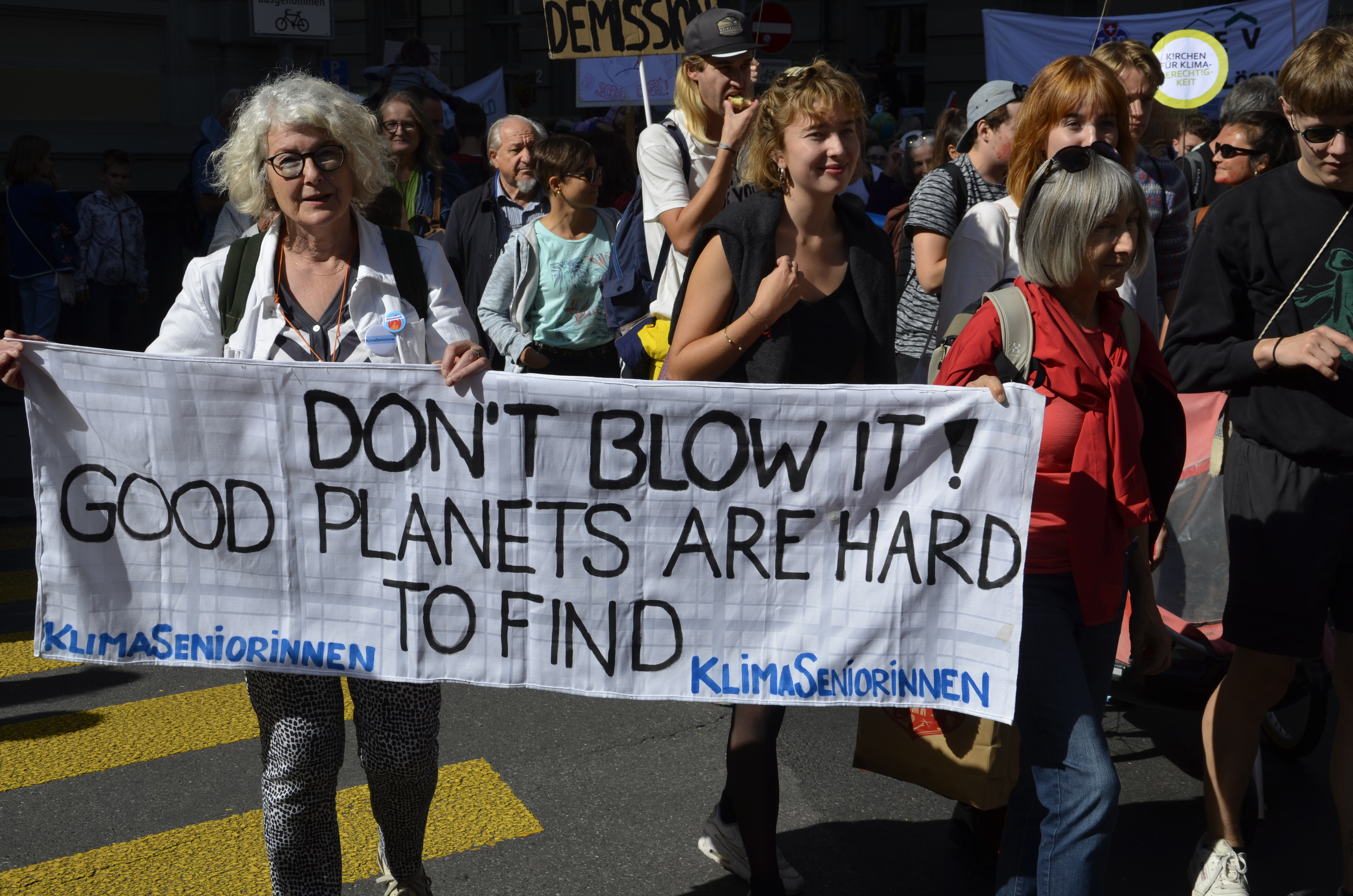
- KlimaSeniorinnen demonstration in 2015
- Court: European Court of Human Rights, Grand Chamber
- Full case name: Verein KlimaSeniorinnen Schweiz and Others v. Switzerland
- Decided: 9 April 2024
- Citations: [2024] ECHR 304, 53600/20

Keywords
- Climate damage, state duties

Verein KlimaSeniorinnen Schweiz v. Switzerland (2024) is a landmark European Court of Human Rights case in which the court ruled that Switzerland violated the European Convention on Human Rights by failing to adequately address climate change. It is the first climate change litigation in which an international court has ruled that state inaction violates human rights.

== Background ==
=== Climate change in Switzerland ===
As part of its effort to fight climate change caused by carbon dioxide (CO_{2}) emissions, in 2011 Switzerland passed the Federal Act on the Reduction of CO_{2} Emissions, more commonly called the CO_{2} Act, which came into force at the start of 2013. The CO_{2} Act, as enacted, set a target of a 20% reduction in CO_{2} emissions over 1990 levels by 2020. Several amendments were since added to the CO_{2} Act, including in response to the Paris Agreement in 2015, with a future target of 50% reductions in emissions compared to 1990 levels by 2030 and net zero emissions by 2050.

To achieve this, Switzerland primarily worked with the European Union to engage with the established European Union Emissions Trading System (ETS), using "cap and trade" emissions trading; policy makers establish emissions caps for companies based on their industry and size. Companies that exceed their emissions allowances are fined, which is meant as an incentive to drive the company to reduce emissions in the future. Companies that fall under their emissions caps are allowed to trade their unrealized emissions on the ETS for financial profit, with companies that exceed emissions able to buy those credits towards offsetting their own excess. The EU established the ETS for all participating countries within the EU, with the intent to incentivise all emission-generating companies within the EU to participate. The EU ETS system was considered as a means to reduce emissions under both the 1997 Kyoto Protocol and Paris Agreement.

As 2020 approached, the effectiveness of the EU ETS came into question, as the reductions achieved by the system were more modest than projected; from 2008 to 2016, emissions reductions only dropped by 3.8% greater than emissions changes without the ETS in place. Issues such as corporate profiteering off emissions allowances, emission volatility, and political factors were seen as working against the goals of achieving higher emission reductions through the ETS. The Swiss government took little action and the target of a 20% reduction by 2020 failed to be met, with an emissions reduction of only 11% realized by 2019.

State of the Netherlands v. Urgenda Foundation was a 2019 landmark case before the Supreme Court of the Netherlands that found the Dutch government at fault for failing to reach its targeted 25% reduction in emissions by 2020, and that established that fighting climate change was considered a human right under Articles 2 and 8 of the European Convention on Human Rights (ECHR), the first such time the ECHR was used in relation to climate change.

=== Lower courts ===
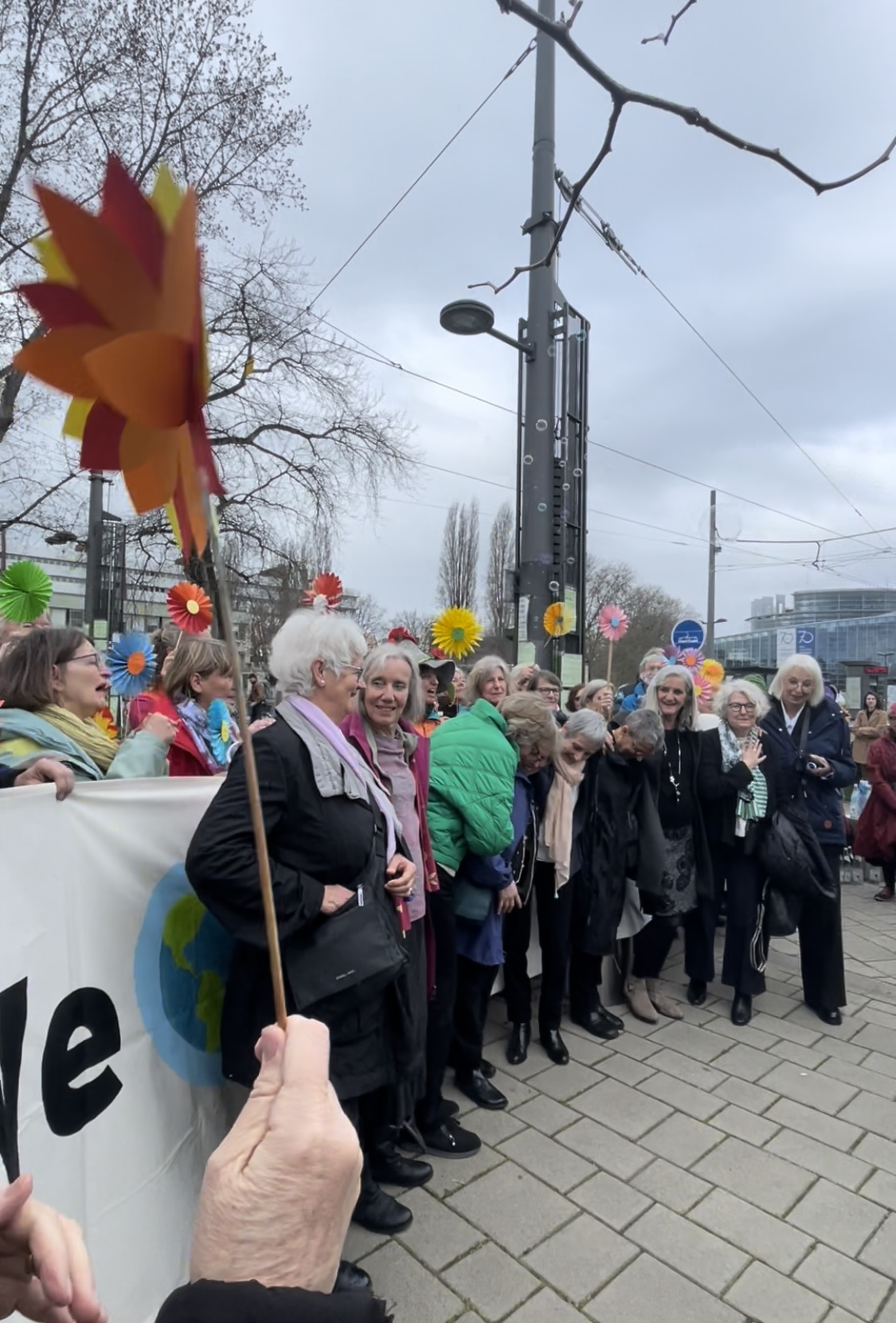
Members of KlimaSeniorinnen Schweiz at the European Court of Human Rights in April 2023

KlimaSeniorinnen Schweiz (Senior Women for Climate Protection) is a group of elderly women in Switzerland, initially formed by a group of 40 in 2016, and having grown to a membership of more than 2,500 as of April 2024. The formation of the group was triggered by concerns that the Swiss government was not taking sufficient action to meet the climate change goals of the CO_{2} Act, which would lead to warmer temperatures and threaten their health, particularly for their members over 75. They started seeking demands from the Federal Council in late 2016, and with legal backing from Greenpeace, filed lawsuits against the government for their inaction. The lawsuit was dismissed through multiple Swiss courts, including the Federal Supreme Court in 2020, ruling that the women's rights were not impacted and instead they should seek political actions.

== European Court of Human Rights ==
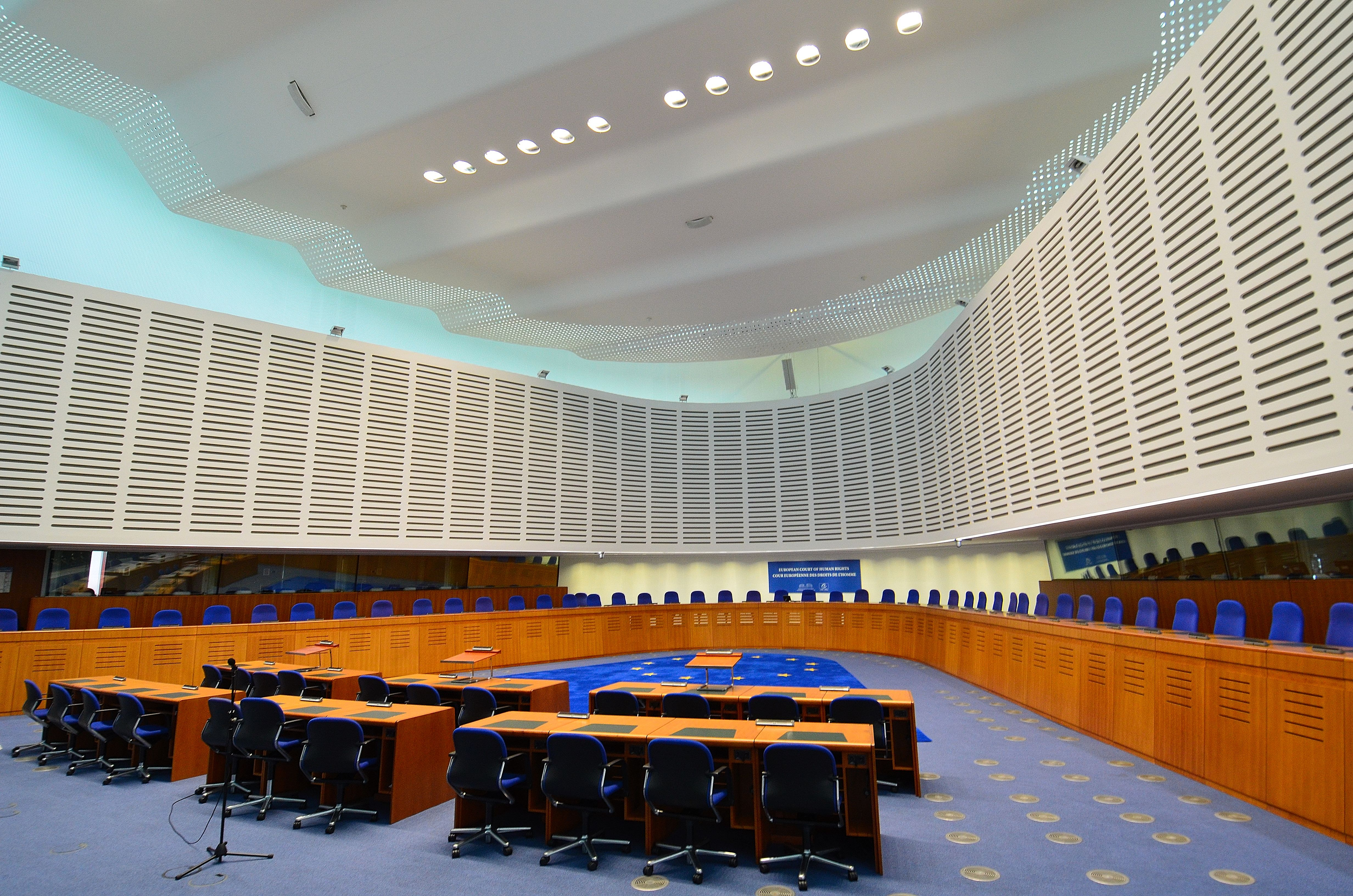
The European Court of Human Rights ruled that Switzerland should better implement the legal framework to limit the serious adverse effects of the climate crisis.

With the Federal Supreme Court's dismissal of their case, KlimaSeniorinnen Schweiz took their complaints to the European Court of Human Rights, which has jurisdiction across the member states of the Council of Europe, in 2020. The case was accepted by the Court and assigned to the Grand Chamber, which typically is reserved for the most important issues related to human rights under the ECHR. The lawsuit was the first environmental-related case heard by the Court. Eight other countries – Romania, Latvia, Austria, Slovakia, Norway, Italy, Portugal and Ireland – joined Switzerland's side in seeking dismissal of the case with the intent that individual states should determine their own climate policies.

The Grand Chamber heard arguments on 29 March 2023. The Court issued its decision on 9 April 2024, ruling in favour of the KlimaSeniorinnen Schweiz. In its decision, the Court stated that Switzerland failed to protect its citizens from climate change "in good time and in an appropriate and consistent manner", and required the state to reassess and address its climate change goals, with these efforts to be overseen by government representatives from the Council of Europe.

Rosmarie Wydler-Wälti, co-president of the KlimaSeniorinnen, called the ruling "a victory for all generations", while a Swiss federal office of justice stated the country will evaluate the decision and determine what actions they can take. The decision is considered the first decision from an international court emphasizing that climate change endangers human rights; the ruling applies to all states within the Council of Europe. While the ruling is not expected to directly impact other countries such as the United States, where multiple environmental lawsuits have been filed directly at companies, "the idea that climate change impaired fundamental rights resonated throughout these cases", according to Michael Gerrard, a law professor at Columbia Law School.

=== Judge Eicke's dissent ===
The judge in respect of the United Kingdom, Tim Eicke issued a dissenting opinion in which he said that the majority "tried to run before it could walk” and that the decision to impose such positive obligations in terms of climate change on State Parties was not legitimate. In his view, the majority's decision is counterproductive and will burden states with litigation regarding any measures that they will take in relation to climate change.

=== Further developments ===
In one of the first decisions concerning climate change since this decision, Greenpeace Nordic and Others v. Norway, the Court held that there had been no violation of Article 8. The Court held that when making a decision in the context of the environment and climate change, the State had to carry out an adequate, timely and comprehensive environmental impact assessment in good faith, and based on the best available science. While the processes leading to the 2016 decision in this case had not been fully comprehensive and, in particular, the assessment of the activity’s climate impacts had been deferred, there was no indication that deferring such an assessment had been inherently insufficient to support the State’s guarantees of respect for private and family life within the meaning of the Convention. In terms of admissibility, while the Court accepted the victim status of the associations which brought the case, it did not accept that the individual applicants had victim status since it observed that their claims of climate anxiety or climate grief had not been supported by medical evidence. Even though the Court found no violation, the ruling was welcomed by NGOs since the Court made clear that future oil and gas projects should assess the global climate impact of these fossil fuel projects – including emissions from combustion, wherever they take place – before the relevant State opens new fields to drilling.

== Reactions ==
=== Domestic ===
The current President of the Swiss Confederation, Viola Amherd, expressed surprise in her first reaction to the judgment. The Federal Department of Environment, Transport, Energy and Communications said that it will inspect the judgement together with the Federal Swiss office for justice. This office additionally stressed the environmental protection undertakings of the past years, including the 2023 Climate and Innovation Act, which provides for a complete phase-out of fossil energy by 2050.

The judgement was widely commented on in Swiss media, with critical reactions dominating domestically. The paper Neue Zürcher Zeitung described the judgement as "absurd" and called for a debate about the "sense and purpose of the European Convention on Human Rights". The paper Blick said that while the judgement was a "sensation", it criticised it as "alienating, possibly even counterproductive". The paper Tages-Anzeiger expressed fears of pressures on democracy if "courts start to determine the course of climate policies". The paper Republik said the decision was "significant", a worldwide precedent.

Reactions from politicians in Switzerland were aligned with the relevant political spectrum. Leftist and green parties, among them the Social Democratic Party and the Green Party, praised the court's decision, calling it "historic". Mattea Meyer, co-head of the Social Democratic Party, described the judgement of "Europe's highest court" as a "slap in the face for the lower house of the Swiss Parliament". The head of the Green Liberal Party, Jürg Grossen, described the judgement as "not surprising", as it is apparently known that politics does too little for the climate. The liberal FDP and the right-wing conservative Swiss People's Party (SVP) were critical of the decision. FDP member of parliament Christian Wasserfallen described the court's decision as "absolutely incomprehensible". The party itself provided no initial reaction. The SVP echoed its criticism of international treaties such as the ECHR, and even called on Switzerland to withdraw from the Council of Europe.

On 12 June 2024 the Swiss parliament recommended that the government reject the court's ruling, claiming that Switzerland already had an effective climate response. The decision was condemned by the KlimaSeniorinnen, who threatened to return to court if the government chose to adopt the legislature's suggestion. On 28 August the government released a statement announcing that it believed it had already fulfilled the court's requirements via amendments made to the CO_{2} Act earlier that year.

=== International ===
The German news show Tagesschau believed in its commentary that "future generations [will] be thankful" for this judgement, and that future governments will have to face the possibility of other cases like this. Britain's The Guardian spoke of a groundbreaking decision that would increase pressure on governments so that they would not fill the atmosphere with gases that contribute to extreme weather conditions any more. Austria's Der Standard disclosed in its reporting an Austrian climate change case that is still pending. The judgement against Switzerland seems to be "of significance for all Europe".

Swedish environmental activist Greta Thunberg celebrated the court's decision at the European Court of Human Rights building.

Richard Ekins of the University of Oxford condemned the judgment as "inventing new obligations on member states in relation to climate change and proclaiming a new power to superintend environmental policy across Europe" and predicted that it would reignite the debate about British withdrawal from the ECHR. Former Supreme Court of the United Kingdom justice Lord Sumption said that the European Court of Human Rights "has become an avowed enemy not just of democratic decision-making but of good government" as a result of the judgment.

== See also ==
- Climate litigation
- Lliuya v RWE AG (2015) Case No. 2 O 285/15 duty of power company in tort to compensate for climate damage
- Neubauer v Germany (24 March 2021) 1 BvR 2656/18, duty on state to reduce carbon emissions faster than government required in Act to protect right to life and environment
- Milieudefensie v Royal Dutch Shell (26 May 2021) duty of oil company in tort to cut emissions in line with Paris Agreement and right to life
- McGaughey and Davies v Universities Superannuation Scheme Ltd [2022] EWHC 1233 (Ch), directors' duties to plan to divest fossil fuels in light of Paris Agreement and right to life
- Smith v Fonterra Co-operative Group Ltd [2024] NZSC 5
