= Greenpeace v. Eni =

2024 Italian court case

- Court: Civil Court of Rome
- Full case name: Greenpeace Italy v. ENI S.p.A., the Italian Ministry of Economy and Finance and Cassa Depositi e Prestiti S.p.A.

Greenpeace v. Eni is a 2024 human rights law and tort law suit heard by the Civil Court of Rome, Italy related to efforts by several NGOs to reduce carbon dioxide emissions by multinational corporations. The lawsuit was brought by the Italian branch of Greenpeace, the advocacy group ReCommon, and twelve civil plaintiffs. The suit was filed against energy company Eni and two of its co-owners, the Italian Ministry of Economy and Finance and the investment bank Cassa Depositi e Prestiti.

The case, which is based on the 2021 Milieudefensie v Royal Dutch Shell court case, is the first climate change lawsuit filed against a privately owned company in Italy.

== Background and previous cases ==
In April 2019, Milieudefensie (the Dutch branch of Friends of the Earth), Greenpeace, ActionAid and four other NGOs, together with 17,379 Dutch individual claimants, filed Milieudefensie v Royal Dutch Shell, a class-action lawsuit against Shell plc, arguing that the oil corporation should change its business model to reduce their carbon emissions by 45% by 2030, in line with the goals set by Paris Agreement. According to the plaintiffs, by failing to adjust to a more sustainable model, Shell had failed to uphold the unwritten duty of care laid down in Book 6 Section 162 of the Burgerlijk Wetboek (Dutch Civil Code), as well as articles 2 and 8 of the European Convention on Human Rights. Hearings at the district court of The Hague were held in December 2020; in May 2021, judges ordered Shell to reduce its global emissions by 45% by 2030, compared to 2019 levels, with the reduction targets including emissions both from its operations and products. Although Shell appealed the ruling, the case was considered the first major lawsuit to hold a corporation accountable for insufficient measures taken to reach the goals of the Paris Agreement.

On 5 June 2021, a group of 24 associations and 179 civil plaintiffs (17 of whom were minors), led by non-profit association A Sud (To South in Italian), filed a lawsuit against the Italian government in the Civil Court of Rome, with the main goals of holding national institutions "accountable for the state of danger caused by [their] inertia in tackling the climate change emergency", and securing a ruling that Italy must cut its greenhouse gas emissions by 92% by 2030, as compared to 1990 levels. While the co-plaintiffs included members of the Italian branch of Fridays For Future, as well as meteorologist Luca Mercalli, other notable environmentalist organizations, including Legambiente and the Italian branch of Greenpeace, opted not to support the lawsuit. The president of Greenpeace Italy, Giuseppe Onufrio, justified the decision by stating that court cases should focus on influential companies, rather than institutions, to be more effective. On 26 February 2023, the Court of Rome ruled that the case was inadmissible, explaining that the court had not the power to decide on climate matters related to the political sphere; the legal team of the plaintiffs and associations involved in the case announced that they would appeal the judgement.

== Lawsuit and related events ==
On 9 May 2023, the Italian branch of Greenpeace, the advocacy group ReCommon, and twelve Italian civil plaintiffs announced that they would file a lawsuit against energy company Eni, as well as the Ministry of Economy and Finance and Cassa Depositi e Prestiti (both involved as co-owners), in the Civil Court of Rome, requesting that hearings begin in November of the same year. Having been modeled around the Milieudefensie et al v Royal Dutch Shell court case, the lawsuit became the first climate litigation against a privately owned company in Italy. Greenpeace and ReCommon also launched a campaign in support of their lawsuit, named La Giusta Causa (The Right Cause in Italian).

The allegations against Eni focused on the company's central role in increasing fossil fuel usage during the latest decades, despite being aware of the risks related to carbon emissions. A DeSmog inquiry shared some of the documents used by the plaintiffs as evidence supporting their lawsuit: firstly, a study commissioned by Eni itself to an affiliate research centre between 1969 and 1970, which had underlined the risk of a "catastrophic" climate crisis by 2000, posed by an unchecked rise in fossil fuel usage; secondly, a 1978 report produced by Tecneco, another sub-division of Eni, which had accurately estimated that the CO_{2} concentration would have reached 375-400 ppm by 2000, while noting that such changes to the thermal balance of the atmosphere of Earth could have had "serious consequences for the biosphere." DeSmog's investigation also found that Eni's magazine, Ecos, had repeatedly included references to climate change in articles written throughout the late 1980s and 1990s, while hosting advertising campaigns wrongly claiming that natural gas was a "clean fuel".

The twelve citizens who joint-filed the lawsuit lived in several different Italian areas that had been affected directly by the consequences of climate change: for instance, four of them were from Polesine, an area within the Veneto region at high risk of hydrogeological damage due to sea level rise and consequent saltwater intrusion within the delta of the Po River, whereas two other plaintiffs lived in heavily-polluted areas of Piedmont, a region hit by persistent droughts in previous years; finally, two citizens hailed from areas that suffered the worst outcomes of the 2018 Vaia Storm.

As a result of these allegations, the plaintiffs asked the court to "acknowledge the damage and the violation of [their] human rights to life, health and an undisturbed personal life" and rule that Eni must cut their emissions from 2020 levels by 45% by 2030, in order to reach the goals set by the Paris Agreement. In an official response, Eni's board said they would prove the lawsuit was "groundless", claiming that their decarbonisation plans satisfied "the essential objectives of sustainability, energy security and competitiveness of Italy", while labeling ReCommon's accusations as "repeated defamatory actions".

=== Protests at Eni's headquarters ===
In the night between 4 and 5 December 2023, a group of Greenpeace activists gathered in front of Eni's headquarters in the EUR district in Rome; some of them scaled the building from both sides, before unfurling two banners with the phrase, "Today's emissions = tomorrow's deaths", while others projected anti-fossil fuel and pro-climate justice slogans onto the building. The activists also installed an eight-metre block with the phrase, "Eni's legacy = climate deaths" in proximity of the company's headquarters. The same day as the demonstration, at the United Nations Climate Change Conference in Dubai, the Dutch branch of Greenpeace presented two reports on the estimated impact of carbon emissions from nine major European energy companies, including Eni itself, on premature deaths across the continent by 2100.

=== Greenpeace report on Eni activities ===
In July 2024, Greenpeace Italy released a report monitoring Eni's involvement in projects of hydrocarbon exploration and extraction of petroleum and gas worldwide, which cited official data from Rystad Energy's database as of November 2023. The report found that 552 out of the 767 projects supervised or backed by Eni had started, or were set to start after the Paris Agreement had been reached in 2015; moreover, 96 out of those 552 projects had been authorized after the same treaty, with 27 of them receiving a license after 2021, when the International Energy Agency had called on policymakers to prioritize investments in clean-energy technologies over fossil fuels. Finally, according to the report, 56 out of the 767 projects were taking place inside of protected areas, with the most affected countries including Italy (19 projects), the UK (15), the Netherlands (11) and Nigeria (4).

Greenpeace also raised concerns over Eni-backed projects authorized by the Israeli government in maritime territories near the State of Palestine and the Gaza Strip—which had already been addressed in a discussion at the Chamber of Deputies in February 2024, and were considered to be a violation of the UN Convention on the Law of the Sea— as well as operations undergoing in maritime zones disputed by Cyprus and Turkey.

== Court hearings ==
The first hearing of the court case took place on 16 February 2024. Eni appointed liberist economist and Bruno Leoni Institute co-founder Carlo Stagnaro, as well as Polytechnic University of Milan professor Stefano Consonni, as their consultants. The decision received some criticism for the perceived lack of independence and competence of both consultants: Stagnaro and the IBL had openly supported climate change denial theories and groups throughout the 2000s and the 2010s, while the academic résumé of Consonni stated that, since 1993, he had been directly involved in research financed by multiple oil and gas companies, including Eni itself, ExxonMobil and BP Alternative Energy, as well as the U.S. Department of Energy.

On the other hand, Greenpeace, ReCommon and the civil plaintiffs received consulting, among others, from CNR research director Nicola Armaroli, psychotherapist and eco-anxiety expert Rita Fioravanzo, and climate change experts Richard Heede and Marco Grasso. In October 2022, Grasso had notably resigned from his post as director of an energy transition-related research unit at the University of Milano-Bicocca, in protest over the academic institution's failure to provide clarification regarding funding and management of a five-year joint research agreement with Eni.

The judge of the Court of Rome eventually agreed to set a second hearing, scheduled for 13 September, on preliminary objections raised by Eni, the MEF and CDP, including a so-called "defect of jurisdiction"; the defendants argued that Italian judges would not have the competence to review the greenhouse gas emissions of companies affiliated to the group and located abroad, nor to rule on matters related to the political or business spheres. Greenpeace and ReCommon criticized the decision in a statement, stating that dismissing the lawsuit could potentially prevent future climate litigation in Italy, while standing in contrast to the outcome of the KlimaSeniorinnen Schweiz case.

== Ruling ==
On 21 June, Eni published a press release stating that Greenpeace Italy and ReCommon had requested to suspend the lawsuit in response to their filing of a jurisdictional review, deeming it as a delay strategy allowing them to "continue their ongoing disinformation campaign, prioritizing media attention over rigorous research, analysis, and evaluation"; the following day, the two associations confirmed that they had appealed to the Supreme Court of Cassation, in order to expedite the trial and underline "the need to protect at the highest judicial level our human rights endangered by the human-made climate emergency". One of the plaintiffs' lawyers, Matteo Ceruti, also clarified that the suspension of the lawsuit was required by the Code of Civil Procedure in order to file an appeal for a regulation of jurisdiction before the Italian Supreme Court.

On 17 July, Greenpeace announced that the Civil Court of Rome had officially sent the case to the Court of Cassation; the event marked the first time the Italian Supreme Court was ever involved in ruling on a climate change litigation.

== See also ==
- Climate justice
- Just transition
- Fossil fuel divestment
- Climate change in Italy
- List of environmental lawsuits
