= Sjoukje van Oosterhout =

Dutch politician (born 1993)

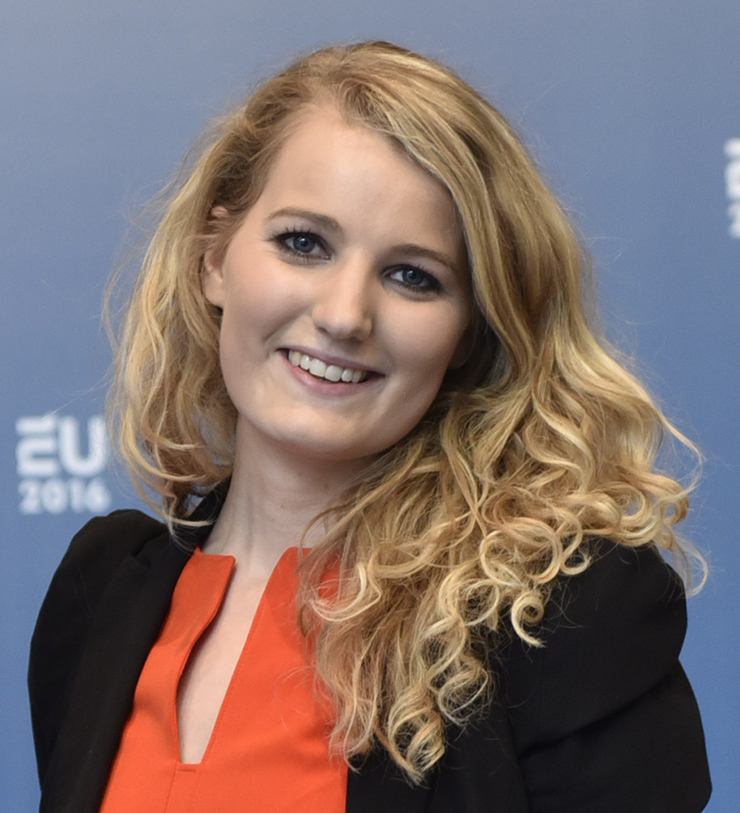
- Van Oosterhout in 2016

Member of the House of Representatives
- Incumbent
- Assumed office 12 November 2025

Personal details
- Born: 29 April 1993 (age 33) Veendam
- Party: GroenLinks (until 2026); PRO (since 2026)
- Parent: Eric van Oosterhout (father)
- Education: University of Groningen (BA) London School of Economics and Political Science (MSc)
- Occupation: Legal researcher

Sjoukje van Oosterhout (Dutch: [ˈɕʌukjə vɑn ˈoːstərɦʌut]; born 29 April 1993) is a Dutch politician who was elected as a member of the House of Representatives for the party alliance GroenLinks-PvdA in 2025. She is also a legal researcher at Milieudefensie, and led the legal team that won the landmark ruling against Royal Dutch Shell, considered the first major lawsuit to hold a corporation responsible in line with the Paris Agreement.

== Early life ==
Sjoukje van Oosterhout was born in 1993 in Veendam and grew up in East Groningen in the earthquake zone. She is the daughter of current Mayor of Emmen, Eric van Oosterhout, who is a member of the Dutch Labour Party (PvdA). She has two sisters, and an adopted Greek stray dog, Benny.

== Political activity ==
In 2014, she was elected as Youth Representative for European Affairs by the Dutch National Youth Council (Nationale Jeugdraad (NJR), an umbrella for youth organisations. Then, she expressed interests in youth unemployment, education about Europe, climate and sustainability, and cross-border European cooperation.

In the 2019 European Parliament elections, she was twelfth place on the GroenLinks candidate list.

=== 2025 House of Representatives elections ===
Sjoukje van Oosterhout was tenth place on GroenLinks-PvdA's candidate list and was elected (then installed on 12 November 2025), since the party coalition won 20 seats. GroenLinks-PvdA was previously the largest opposition party but in fourth, losing 5 seats from the 2023 general elections, triggering the departure of the coalition leader, Frans Timmermans.

She has expressed a primary interest in climate issues and policy, as well as the Dutch housing crisis, public transport, and representing Drenthe and the north of the Netherlands such with local issues such as high energy costs. Her interest in climate issues and policy comes from her experience living in the Groningen earthquake area, and politicisation of it and Groningen residents' experiences.

== Education and work ==
van Oosterhout studied international relations and international organisation in the University of Groningen with a specialisation in European integration from 2011 to 2016, and a Master in European Politics at the London School of Economics and Political Science from 2016 to 2017.

She has worked with Milieudefensie (Dutch environmental non-governmental organisation) since 2020, and was a principal investigator and team leader on the legal team that won a lawsuit against Shell forcing it to reduce its global carbon emissions from its 2019 levels by 45% by 2030 for both its operations and products. The case was considered a landmark ruling for holding a corporation responsible in line with the Paris Agreement. She is also a spokesperson for the organisation.

She also previously worked for Cicero Group as a sustainable finance consultant, for Friends of the Earth in London, and as a policy advisor for the Seattle to Brussels Network in Brussels.
