= Climate change litigation =

Use of legal practice to further climate change mitigation

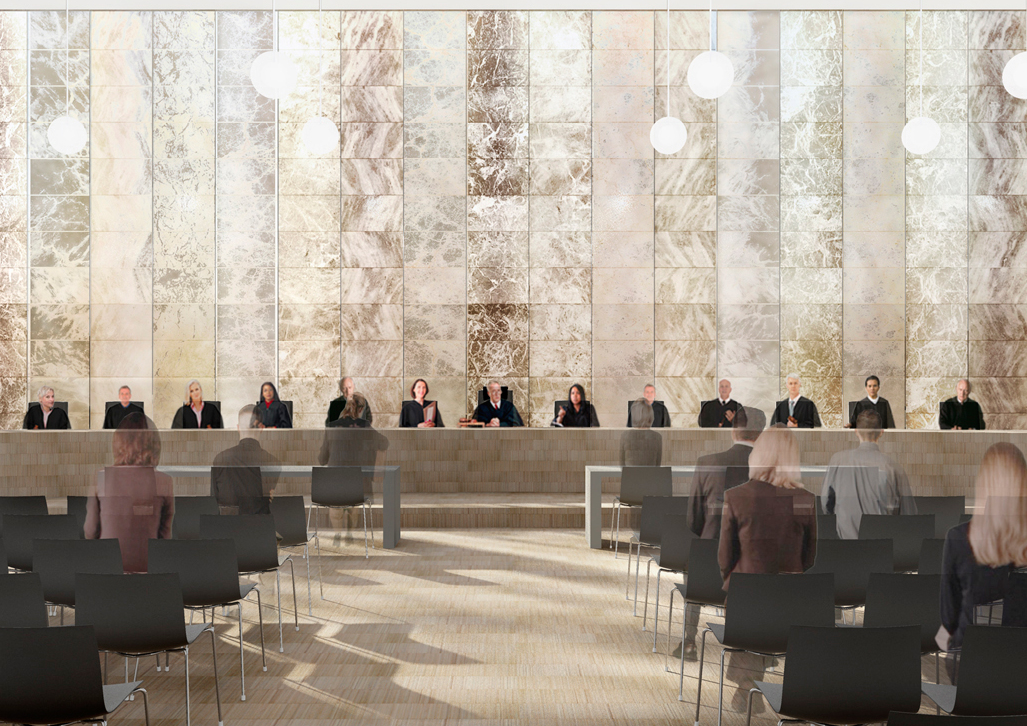
In 2019, the Supreme Court of the Netherlands confirmed that the government must cut carbon dioxide emissions, as climate change threatens human health.

Climate change litigation, also known as climate litigation, is an emerging body of environmental law using legal practice to set case law precedent to further climate change mitigation efforts from public institutions and private entities. In the face of slow climate change politics delaying climate change mitigation, activists and lawyers have increased efforts to use sub-national, national, regional, and international judicial and quasi-judicial systems to advance the effort. Climate litigation typically engages in one of five types of legal claims: Constitutional law (focused on breaches of constitutional rights by the state), administrative law (challenging the merits of administrative decision making), private law (challenging corporations or other organizations for negligence, nuisance, etc.), fraud or consumer protection (challenging companies for misrepresenting information about climate impacts), or human rights (claiming that failure to act on climate change is a failure to protect human rights). Litigants pursuing such cases have had mixed results.

Since the early 2000s, the legal frameworks for combating climate change have increasingly been available through legislation, and an increasing body of court cases have developed an international body of law connecting climate action to legal challenges. Many of the successful cases and approaches have focused on advancing the needs of climate justice and the youth climate movement. Since 2015, there has been a trend in the use of human rights arguments in climate lawsuits, in part due to the recognition of the right to a healthy environment in more jurisdictions and at the United Nations.

High-profile climate litigation cases brought against states include Leghari v. Pakistan, Juliana v. United States (both 2015), Urgenda v. The Netherlands (2019), and Neubauer v. Germany (2021), while Milieudefensie v Royal Dutch Shell (2021) is the highest-profile case against a corporation to date. Environmental activists have asserted that investor-owned coal, oil, and gas corporations could be legally and morally liable for climate-related human rights violations, even though political decisions could prevent them from engaging in such violations. Litigations are often carried out via collective pooling of effort and resources such as via organizations like Greenpeace, such as Greenpeace Poland which sued a coal utility and Greenpeace Germany which sued a car manufacturer. Such cases may take many years to unfold, and have occasionally been unsuccessful despite lengthy efforts, as was the case with Juliana v. United States.

Since 1986, when the first climate case was recorder, the number of cases has been steadily increasing. New case filings began to proliferate after 2015 due, at least in part, to the advent of the Paris Agreement. Overall, the 2010s saw a growing trend of activist cases successfully being won in global courts, as well as a growing body of youth-led litigation. The 2025 UNEP Global Climate Litigation Report - the fourth iteration of the series - identified a cumulative total of 3,099 climate-related cases filed globally across 55 jurisdictions and 24 international or regional courts, tribunals, quasi-judicial bodies or other adjudicatory bodies. This includes 1,936 cases in the United States of America and 1,113 cases in all other countries combined. The latter number comprises 611 cases filed in the Global North, 305 in the Global South, and 216 before international or regional adjudicatory bodies. By December 2022, the number had grown to 2,180, including 1,522 in the U.S. The number of litigation cases is expected to continue rising in the 2020s.

In March 2025, the U.S. Supreme Court declined a request by Republican-led states to block efforts by Democratic-led states to file lawsuits in state courts holding energy companies accountable for the damages caused by climate change.

There is a growing number of litigation cases, and international decisions can influence domestic courts. However, some cases work in the opposite direction: they challenge climate action and are not aligned with climate goals.

== Methods and types of laws ==
Climate litigation typically falls into one of five broad areas of law:

- Constitutional law — focused on breaches of constitutional rights by the state.
- Administrative law — challenging the merits of administrative decision making within existing on-the-books laws, such as not granting permissions for high-emissions projects.
- Private law — challenging corporations or other organizations for negligence, nuisance, trespass, public trust, and unjust enrichment.
- Fraud or consumer protection — typically challenging companies for misrepresenting information about climate impacts.
- Human rights — claiming that failure to act on climate change or to protect related natural resources, such as the atmosphere or the rainforest, fails to protect human rights.

These areas are not static. For instance, Smith v Fonterra Co-operative Group Ltd argues for the new tort of climate change damage and the New Zealand Supreme Court duly ruled in 2024 that this novel civil wrong can be asserted in future proceedings. however, in May 2026 the New Zealand government countered this decision by introducing legislation to prevent climate lawsuits.

== Scale ==
The 2017 UN Litigation Report identified 884 cases in 24 countries, including 654 cases in the United States and 230 cases in all other countries combined. As of July 1, 2020, the number of cases has almost doubled to at least 1,550 climate change cases filed in 38 countries (39 including the courts of the European Union), with approximately 1,200 cases filed in the US and over 350 filed in all other countries combined. By December 2022, the number had grown to 2,180, including 1,522 in the U.S.

Scholars have observed a "rapidly growing landscape of climate litigation" (as of 2024) and say that courts are shaping law and governance trajectories, beyond the narrow confines of domestic law.

== By type of action ==
=== Cases to increase accountability ===
Existential problem of planetary proportions

(Climate change is) an existential problem of planetary proportions that imperils all forms of life and the very health of our planet. ... A complete solution to this daunting, and self-inflicted, problem requires the contribution of all fields of human knowledge, whether law, science, economics or any other.

— International Court of Justice advisory opinion regarding Obligations of States in respect of climate change
26 July 2025

Courts play a critical role in creating, increasing and imposing accountability on and for public authorities and private actors for climate and related harms caused by their actions or their failure to act. Courts articulate what it means for public and private actors to be accountable in relation to climate (in)action.

National courts have ordered governments to:

- legislate on climate change (e.g. Shrestha v Office of the Prime Minister, 2018);
- define sufficiently ambitious mitigation targets (e.g. Klimaatzaak v Belgium, 2021);
- develop a clear long-term emission-reduction strategy (e.g. Friends of the Irish Environment v Ireland, 2020) or a realistic long-term emission reduction pathway (e.g. Neubauer v Germany, 2021);
- present complete information on how it plans to achieve its statutory carbon budget (e.g. Friends of the Earth v Secretary of State for Business, Energy and Industrial Strategy, 2022);
- comply with a statutory carbon budget (e.g. Grande-Synthe v France, 2021) or to take appropriate measures to achieve a statutory carbon budget (e.g. Oxfam v France, 2021).

=== Between governments and companies ===
In the United States, Friends of the Earth, Greenpeace together with the cities of Boulder, Arcata and Oakland filed against the Export-Import Bank of the United States and the Overseas Private Investment Corporation (state-owned enterprises of the United States government), which were accused of financing fossil-fuel projects detrimental to a stable climate, in violation of the National Environmental Policy Act (case filed in 2002 and settled in 2009).

In 2017, San Francisco, Oakland and other California coastal communities sued multiple fossil-fuel companies for rising sea levels; they lost.

In 2018, the city of New York announced that it is taking five fossil fuel firms (BP, ExxonMobil, Chevron, ConocoPhillips and Shell) to federal court due to their contribution to climate change (from which the city is already suffering).

In 2020, Charleston, South Carolina, followed a similar strategy.

In June 2023, Multnomah County, Oregon sued several fossil fuel companies and industry trade groups, seeking at least $50 billion to help the county study and implement harm reduction strategies. The suit also asks for $50 million to cover past damages, and $1.5 billion in future damages. The lawsuit alleges that parties, including ExxonMobil, Chevron and the American Petroleum Institute, deceptively used "pseudo-science, fabricated doubt, and a well-funded, sustained public relations campaign" to subvert scientific consensus over the course of decades.

== Cases involving multilateral institutions ==
=== European Union ===
In 2018, ten families from European countries, Kenya and Fiji filed a suit against the European Union for the threats against their homes caused by the EU greenhouse emissions. The European Union adopted an anti-slapp directive aiming to protect human right defenders and journalists from lawsuits intended to silence them.

=== European Court of Human Rights ===
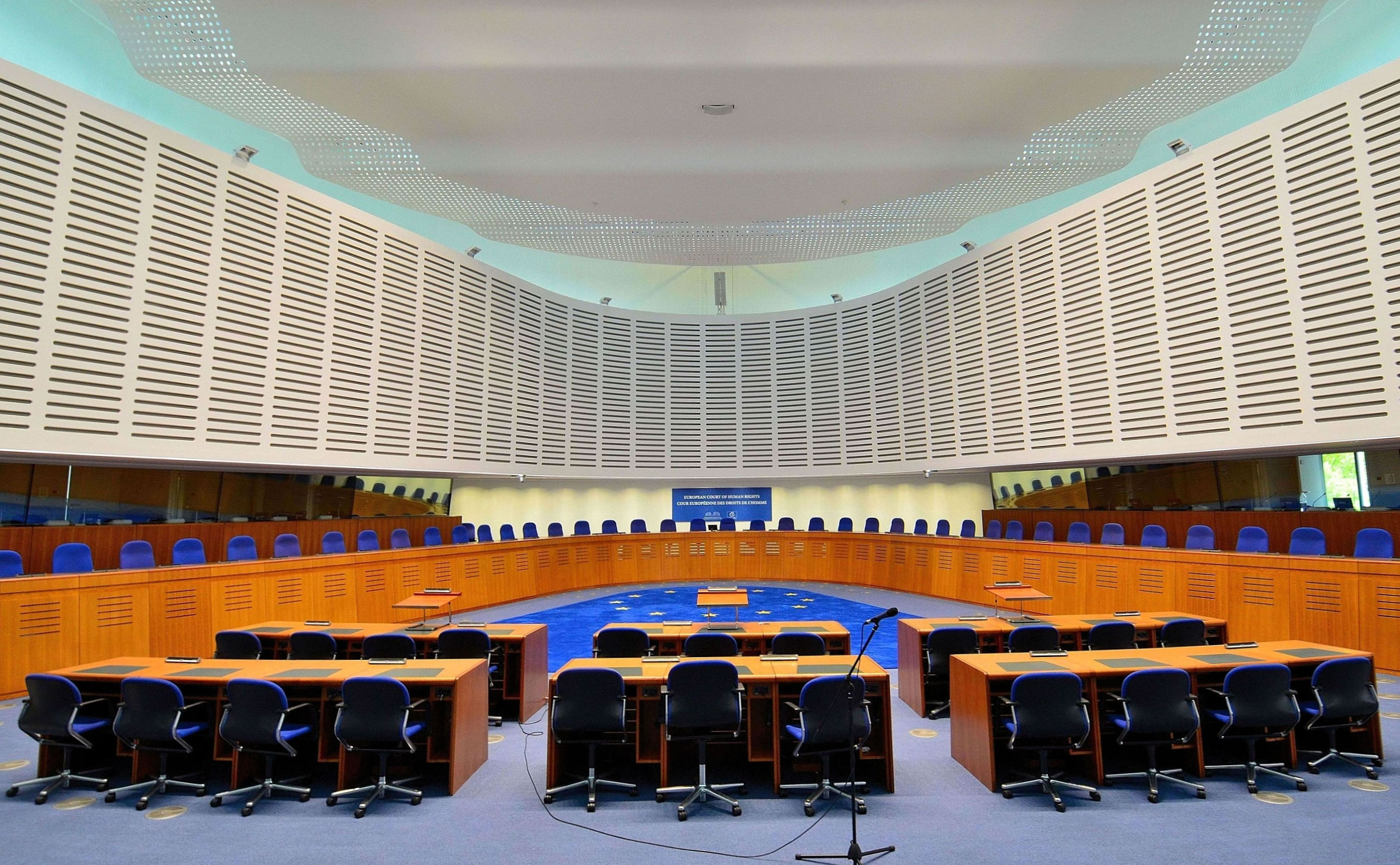
In 2024, the European Court of Human Rights ruled that States must protect the population from the serious adverse effects of climate change on lives, health and well-being.

Verein KlimaSeniorinnen Schweiz v. Switzerland (2024) was a landmark case of the European Court of Human Rights in which the court ruled that Switzerland violated the European Convention on Human Rights by failing to adequately address climate change. It is the first case in which an international court has ruled that state inaction related to climate change violates human rights.

=== United Nations ===
On 29 March 2023, the United Nations adopted a resolution calling for the International Court of Justice (ICJ) to "strengthen countries' obligations to curb warming and protect communities from climate disaster". In 2025 ICJ was expected to issue a decision clarifying legal requirements on states to respond to the climate crisis and articulating consequences that countries should face for failure to meet those requirements. In July 2025, the ICJ has said in an advisory opinion, a "clean, healthy and sustainable environment" is a human right, and that failing to protect the planet from the impacts of climate change may be a violation of international law.

== By country ==
=== Australia ===
As of May 2026 Australia had the third most number of cases filed in the world, totaling 193. Cases in Australia include Torres Strait Islanders v. Australia (2019), in which the United Nations Human Rights Committee found that the Australian government had violated the Islanders' human rights by failure to act on climate change, Youth Verdict v. Waratah Coal (2020), and Sharma v. Minister for the Environment (2020), in which eight young people unsuccessfully argued for an injunction against the expansion of a Whitehaven coal mine. This was followed by Pabai v Commonwealth in 2025, where the Federal Court found that the Commonwealth did not owe a duty of care to Torres Strait Islanders relating to the setting of emission limits and adaptation infrastructure.

=== Belgium ===
In June 2021, after a six year long legal battle, the Court of First Instance ruled that the climate targets of the government of Belgium are too low and therefore "breached the right to life (article 2) and the right to respect for private and family life (article 8)" of the European Convention on Human Rights.

=== Colombia ===
A group of children in Colombia sued the government to protect the Amazon rainforest from deforestation due to the deforestation's contribution to climate change. In 2018, the Supreme Court ruled that the Colombian rainforest was an "entity subject of rights" requiring protection and restoration.

=== France ===
In 2020, an administrative court case in France, required the Macron administration to review their policies to address climate change to make sure they were significant enough to meet Paris Agreement commitments.

=== Finland ===
In November 2022, the Finnish Association for Nature Conservation and Greenpeace Nordic filed a complaint claiming the Finnish government due to inadequate action violated the Finnish Climate Change Act and made the achievement of legally-binding climate targets highly unlikely. The government had not acted in response to the collapse of Finland's forest carbon sink, which was argued to require updated policies and measures in order not to jeopardize for instance the target of carbon neutrality by 2035. In June 2023, the Supreme Administrative Court of Finland found the appeal to be inadmissible on procedural grounds, after a 3–2 vote. Under Finnish law, it is generally not possible to appeal against governmental inaction. The outcome has been interpreted as encouraging for future climate litigation cases due to the 3-2 rather than unanimous vote and to the court's reasoning attached to the decision, which stresses the link between climate change and human rights. The court emphasized that climate change is a question of humanity's fate, which threatens the living conditions of current and future generations and stated that "postponing measures transfers the responsibility to the future" (paragraph 66) and opened the door for future appeals in case the government inaction continues.

In August 2024, a coalition of NGOs including Greenpeace Nordic, the Finnish Association for Nature Conservation, Amnesty Finland, Finnish Nature League, Finnish Sámi Youth, and Grandparents for Climate, filed a second climate appeal with the Supreme Administrative Court. The NGOs argued that the governments inaction on GHG emissions violated Finnish and EU climate law and human rights obligations, and that the government in accordance with Finlands Climate Change act must adopt a formal decision on additional measures and amend climate plans in response to the continuing deterioration of Finlands forest carbon sink. Representatives of the group Finnish Sámi Youth say that the lack of climate action by the government directly threatens the lives of Sámi living in the Arctic. The court dismissed the case in January 2025, noting that the Government's policies considered the situation of the carbon sink but that the effect of suggested measures would take time, thus hindering assessment of their sufficiency and therefore also lawfulness.

Finland's third case concerned the government's adoption of a long-term climate plan in December 2025. Greenpeace Finland and the Finnish Association for Nature Conservation have challenged whether this plan is in line with the requirements of the Climate Act before the Supreme Administrative court of Finland. According to the Climate Act, the climate plan must set out long-term scenarios and pathways for achieving the objectives such as climate targets and carbon neutrality for 2035. The climate plan of 2025 outlines four scenarios for policy trajectory. One of the scenarios does not lead to the achievement of Finland's climate targets and only one reaches the carbon neutrality of 2035, which is argued to jeopardize long-term climate targets and raise concerns about intergenerational equity.

=== Germany ===
In 2021, Germany's supreme constitutional court ruled in Neubauer v. Germany that the government's climate protection measures are insufficient to protect future generations and that the government had until the end of 2022 to improve its Climate Protection Act.

A court case brought by German citizens against their government in 2022 based on a newly minted human right to breathe clean and healthy air could pave the way for future legislation with regards to climate action.

In 2023, the Berlin-Brandenburg Higher Administrative Court said the government's action on transport and housing fell short under a law setting upper limits for carbon emissions for individual sectors. Under the ruling, Berlin must present emergency programmes to bring its policy on transport and housing back in line with the current Climate Protection Act from 2024 to 2030.

==== Lliuya v RWE AG ====
In 2025, the Higher Court of Hamm, North Rhine-Westphalia ruled in Lliuya v RWE AG that the case was to be dismissed. However, the court ruled that the German energy company RWE was, on legal principle, liable to pay for protections to the claimant's house from the risk of glacial lake out bursting flooding, in proportion to their historic emissions contribution to climate change.

=== Republic of Ireland ===
In July 2020, Friends of the Irish Environment won a landmark case against the Irish government for failing to take sufficient action to address the climate and ecological crisis. The Supreme Court of Ireland ruled that the Irish government's 2017 National Mitigation Plan was inadequate, specifying that it did not provide enough detail on how it would reduce greenhouse gas emissions.

=== Italy ===
==== Giudizio Universale lawsuit ====
On 5 June 2021, a group of 24 associations and 179 citizens (17 of whom were minor), led by non-profit association A Sud ('To South'), officially filed a lawsuit against the Italian government in the civil court in Rome, with the main goals of holding national institutions "accountable for the state of danger caused by [their] inertia in tackling the climate change emergency", as well as ruling that Italy must cut its greenhouse gas emissions from 1990 levels by 92% within 2030. This last target, which set more ambitious targets than the European Green Deal, was based on independent researches on international climate politics made by Climate Analytics and the New Climate Institute.

The co-plaintiffs, which included Fridays For Future members and meteorologist Luca Mercalli, were assisted by three attorneys specialized in environmental law. Other notable environmentalist organizations, including Legambiente and Greenpeace, opted not to support the lawsuit: president of Greenpeace Italy, Giuseppe Onufrio, justified the decision by stating that court cases should focus on influential companies, rather than institutions, to become more effective.

==== Eni lawsuit ====
On 9 May 2023, Greenpeace Italy and advocacy group ReCommon, together with 12 Italian plaintiffs from several areas directly affected by climate change, officially announced that they would file a lawsuit against national energy company Eni, as well as the Ministry of Economy and Finance and Cassa Depositi e Prestiti (both involved as co-owners), requesting to set the beginning of the hearings in November of the same year. Also known as La Giusta Causa ('The Right Cause'), and based on the Milieudefensie et al v Royal Dutch Shell court case, it became the first climate lawsuit ever filed against a private-owned company in Italy.

The allegations focused on Eni's central role in increasing fossil fuel usage throughout the latest decades, despite being aware of the emissions' worst risks. A DeSmog inquiry revealed further evidence supporting the lawsuit's claims: firstly, a study commissioned by Eni itself from an affiliate research centre between 1969 and 1970, which had underlined the risk of a "catastrophic" climate crisis by 2000 posed by an unchecked rise in fossil fuel usage; secondly, a 1978 report produced by Tecneco, another company owned by Eni, which had accurately estimated that the CO_{2} concentration would have reached 375-400 ppm by 2000, while noting that such changes to the thermal balance of the atmosphere could have had "serious consequences for the biosphere". DeSmog's investigation also found that Eni's official magazine, Ecos, had repeatedly included references to climate change in articles written throughout the late 1980s and 1990s, while hosting advertising campaigns wrongly claiming that natural gas was a "clean fuel".

The plaintiffs asked the court to "acknowledge the damage and the violation of [their] human rights to life, health and an undisturbed personal life" and rule that Eni must cut their emissions from 2020 levels by 45% within 2030, in order to reach the goals set by the Paris Agreement. In an official response, Eni's board said they would prove the lawsuit was "groundless".

The first hearing of the court case took place on 16 February 2024.

=== Japan ===
As of 2022, four cases targeting coal-fired power stations have been filed in Japan. However, in Japan, the requirements for standing are strict and since greenhouse gas emissions are not prioritized in environmental impact assessments, such cases are frequently dismissed.

Between December 2025 and April 2026, a total of more than 900 plaintiffs filed administrative lawsuits against the Japanese government.

=== Korea ===
On 29 August 2024, the Constitutional Court of Korea ruled that the absence of legally binding targets for greenhouse gas reductions for 2031-2049 violated the constitutional rights of future generations, saying that this lack of long-term targets shifted an excessive burden to the future.

=== Netherlands ===
==== Urgenda case ====
Scholarly article on climate litigation in the Netherlands, especially the Urgenda case

The Urgenda case is an important global precedent for climate litigation. In 2012, the Dutch lawyer Roger Cox gave the idea of judicial intervention to force action against climate change based on government targets for 2030 emissions reductions. In 2013, the Urgenda Foundation, with 900 co-plaintiffs, filed a lawsuit against the Government of the Netherlands "for not taking sufficient measures to reduce greenhouse gas emissions that cause dangerous climate change".

In 2015, the District Court of The Hague ruled that the government of the Netherlands must do more to reduce greenhouse gas emissions to protect its citizens from climate change. It was described as a "precedent-setting judgment" and as the "world's first climate liability suit".

In 2018, a court of appeal in The Hague has upheld the precedent-setting judgment that forces the Dutch government to step up its efforts to curb greenhouse-gas emissions in the Netherlands. In December 2019, the Supreme Court of the Netherlands upheld the ruling on appeal. Thus, affirming that the government must cut carbon dioxide emissions by 25% from 1990 levels by the end of 2020, on the basis that climate change poses a risk to human health.

==== Milieudefensie v Royal Dutch Shell lawsuit ====
Another groundbreaking case in the Netherlands was Milieudefensie et al v Royal Dutch Shell. The case was decided in May 2021, the district court of The Hague ordered Royal Dutch Shell to cut its global carbon emissions by 45% by the end of 2030 compared to 2019 levels, and affirmed the responsibility of the company for scope 3 emissions, e.g., emissions from suppliers and customers of its products.

However, in 2024 a Dutch appeals court dismissed the specific reductions targets.

==== Bonaire case ====
On 28 January 2026, The Hague District Court ruled that the Dutch government had discriminated against the inhabitants of the Caribbean island of Bonaire, by not taking timely and appropriate measures to protect them against the consequences of climate change. The court ordered the Dutch government to set legally binding targets to reduce greenhouse gas emissions in line with the Paris Agreement, as well as making a climate adaptation plan for Bonaire. The case was started in early 2024 by 8 local residents of Bonaire, together with Greenpeace Netherlands.

The court based its ruling on article 8 and 14 of the European Convention on Human Rights, which protect the right to private and family life and prohibit discrimination. The court also found that the Netherlands was not reducing their greenhouse gas emissions in line with the fair share-principle of the Paris Agreement.

=== New Zealand ===
In 2024, the New Zealand Supreme Court gave leave for Māori climate activist Mike Smith to sue seven corporations for their roles in causing climate change and the common law harms that resulted. Several aspects of Smith v Fonterra Co-operative Group Limited are notable. Smith argued that the principles of tikanga Māori — a traditional system of obligations and recognitions of wrong — can be used to inform New Zealand common law. Smith argued that the activities of the seven defendants — by directly emitting greenhouse gasses or supplying fossil fuels — fall under the established torts of public nuisance and negligence and a new tort of climate change damage. Smith further argued that these seven corporations are harming his tribe's land, coastal waters, and traditional culture. Smith belongs to the Northland tribes of Ngāpuhi and Ngāti Kahu. This judgment simply allows Smith to now pursue these matters in the High Court. In May 2026, the defendants successfully lobbied the New Zealand government to introduce legislation preventing civil litigation relating to climate damages, potentially preventing this case, and all future climate tort claims from going ahead.

=== Pakistan ===
In Pakistan in 2015 Lahore High Court ruled in Asghar Leghari vs. Federation of Pakistan that the government was violating the National Climate Change Policy of 2012 and the Framework for Implementation of Climate Change Policy (2014–2030) by failing to meet goals set by the policies. In response, a Climate Change Commission was required to be formed in order to help Pakistan meet its climate goals. The case is considered significant in the history of human rights-based climate litigation.

=== Philippines ===
In May 2024, Nicol Melgar Marba, a Typhoon Odette survivor from Dinagat Islands, Philippines, and other victims of climate disasters from around the world filed before the Paris Criminal Court a criminal complaint against French oil company TotalEnergies, demanding compensation for "losses and damages for climate impacts".

=== South Africa ===
In December 2024 the Supreme Court in South Africa stopped the plans of the government to add 1,500 megawatts of coal-fired power. The court said it is “unlawful and invalid”, and required from the minister and the regulator to pay costs to the complainants. Before it environmentalists already had some victories in South Africa's courts about pollution and drillings.

=== Sweden ===
Aurora is a youth-led association with the goal of getting the Swedish state to stop "fueling the climate crisis" and to treat the climate crisis "as the crisis it is". In 2022 over 600 children and young people sued the Swedish government in a class action lawsuit, claiming that the climate policies of the country were inadequate, did not meet its Paris Agreement commitments, and violate human rights and the Convention on the Rights of the Child, thus emphasizing the generational component of climate justice claims and emphasizing the age-related consequences of the climate crisis, highlighting the vulnerability of young people's health. In 2025 the Supreme Court of Sweden announced that in order for the Aurora case to be tried, the claimants should be able to show that they were personally and directly affected by the negative effects of climate change to a higher degree than the general population, that the case was inadmissible as a class action and that future climate change litigation in Sweden should be done by associations rather than as a group of individuals. This was based on the legal precedent from the European Court of Human Rights in the Swiss Klimaseniorinnen case, making the requirements for a group of individuals to be considered victims very high. In 2026 Aurora as an association sued the Swedish state again for its insufficient action against the climate crisis and in violation of human rights.

=== Turkey ===
Article 56 of the Constitution of Turkey says that, "Everyone has the right to live in a healthy and balanced environment. It is the duty of the State and citizens to improve the natural environment, to protect the environmental health and to prevent environmental pollution." Turkey has ratified the Paris Agreement and says that its greenhouse gas emissions will be net zero by 2053, but the government has no plan to phase out coal. Several cases have been filed, some of which are ongoing.

In 2023 young climate activists opened a case alleging that the nationally determined contribution (NDC) was inadequate. The three youth climate activists filed a lawsuit against President Erdoğan and the Ministry of Environment, Urbanisation and Climate Change because Turkey's Nationally Determined Contribution is not to reduce its greenhouse gas emissions. They alleged that there is no effective climate action plan for energy. They alleged that these violate their human rights stated in the constitution, such as the environmental clause in the constitution. The Council of State rejected the case on the grounds that it was an ‘annulment of an administrative action’ case but the NDC is not an administrative action. As of 2026 the case is at the Constitutional Court.

In 2022 and 2023 cases were brought about Lake Marmara drying up. In 2024 a court decided to pause the process of reclassifying the land as not wetland, on the grounds that it could be rewetted: Doğa are calling for the court to annul the reclassification.

=== United Kingdom ===
In December 2020, three British citizens, Marina Tricks, Adetola Onamade, Jerry Amokwandoh, and the climate litigation charity, Plan B, announced that they were taking legal action against the UK government for failing to take sufficient action to address the climate and ecological crisis. The plaintiffs announced that they will allege that the government's ongoing funding of fossil fuels both in the UK and other countries constitute a violation of their rights to life and to family life, as well as violating the Paris Agreement and the UK Climate Change Act of 2008.

In 2022, it was claimed in McGaughey and Davies v Universities Superannuation Scheme Ltd that the directors of the UK's largest pension fund, USS Ltd had breached their duty to act for proper purposes under the Companies Act 2006 section 171, by failing to have a plan to divest fossil fuels from the fund's portfolio. The claim did not succeed in the High Court, and the claimants appealed to the Court of Appeal, being granted permission for a June 2023 hearing. The case alleges that the right to life must be used to interpret duties in company law, and that because fossil fuels must cease to exist, any investments using them pose a "risk of significant financial detriment".

In February 2023, ClientEarth filed a derivative action claim against Shell's board of directors for putting the company at risk by not transitioning away from fossil fuels quickly enough. ClientEarth said the lawsuit marked "the first time ever that a company's board has been challenged on its failure to properly prepare for the energy transition".

=== United States ===
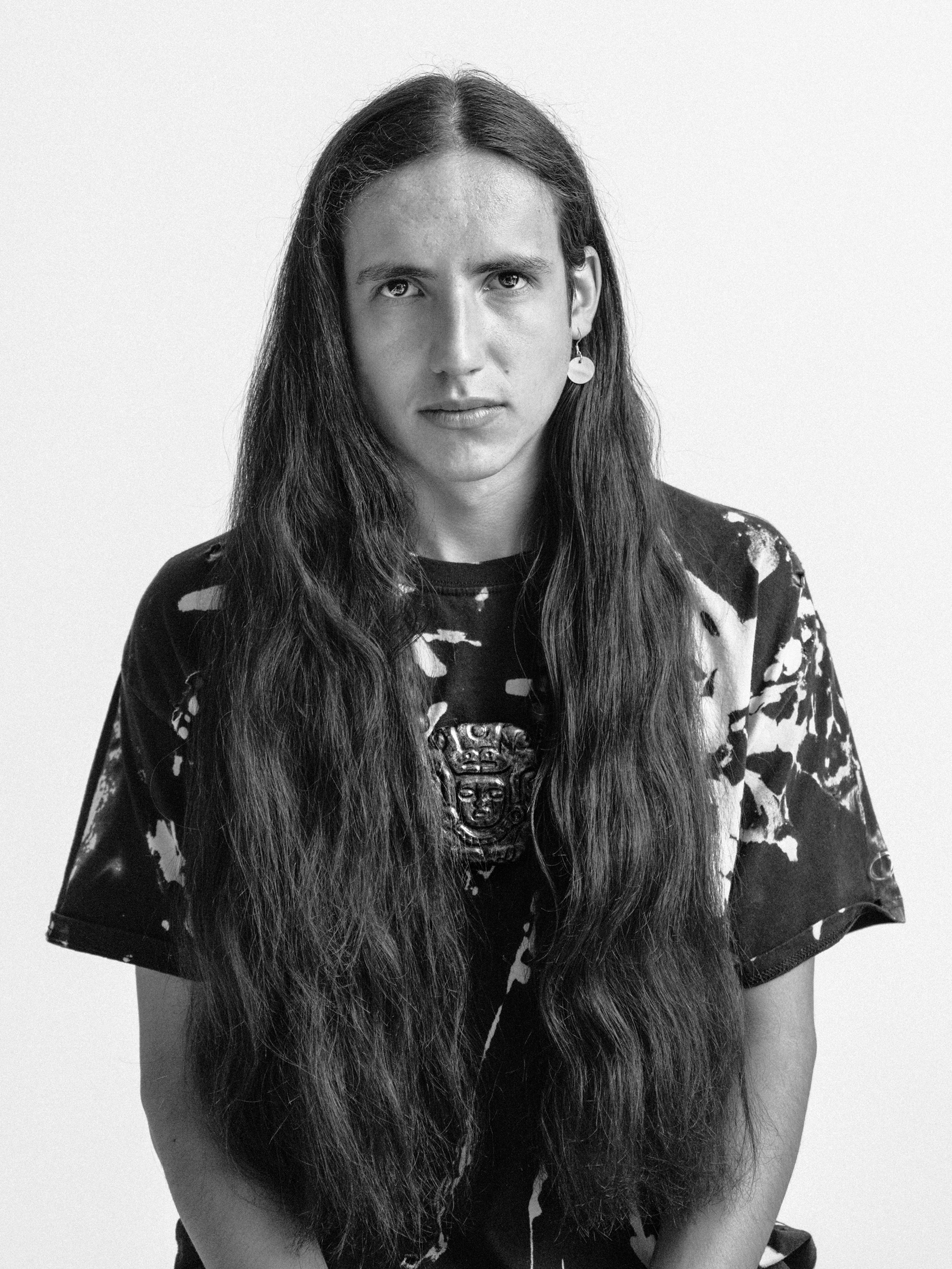
Xiuhtezcatl Martinez was a plaintiff in Juliana v. United States and in the Martinez v. Colorado Oil and Gas Conservation Commission case.

As of February 2020, the U.S. had the most pending cases with over 1,000 in the court system. Examples include Connecticut v. ExxonMobil Corp. and Massachusetts v. Environmental Protection Agency. In the United States climate change litigation addresses existing principal laws to make their claim, most of them focusing on private and administrative law. The most popular principal laws to use are NEPA (the National Environmental Policy Act), with 322 cases filed under its jurisdiction, the Clean Air Act, with 215 cases filed under its jurisdiction, the Endangered Species Act, with 163 cases filed under its jurisdiction. As more efforts continue on the front of climate change, as of August 2022, the federal government continues to approve agreements and class actions in terms of additional climate change initiatives. In addition, since 2015, there are about two dozen liability and fraud cases brought against some of the world's largest oil companies by various states for their role in denying climate policy leading to increased risks and costs borne to state governments. These states include New Jersey, District of Columbia, Delaware, Connecticut, Minnesota, Rhode Island, Massachusetts, and Vermont. Like Minnesota and the District of Columbia before it, New Jersey has also included the industry's top US trade group, the American Petroleum Institute in addition to ExxonMobil, Shell Oil, Chevron, BP and ConocoPhillips.

==== Actions using the Endangered Species Act ====
In the Endangered Species Act (ESA) case, Tennessee Valley Authority v. Hill, the Supreme Court stated that the ESA mandates federal agencies to insure their actions do not jeopardize any species that are listed as endangered in the ESA. Climate change litigation cases that use the ESA primarily focus on articles 7 and 9 of the statue. Article 7 states that all actions carried out by federal agencies must be unlikely to jeopardize the continued existence or result in the destruction of endangered species. Article 9 focuses not just on federal agencies but everybody, banning the taking of any endangered species by any party, be it federal, state, or private.

The first step for climate change activists is to make sure that species threatened by climate change are listed on the ESA by the Fish and Wildlife Service (FWS). Oftentimes this alone can be a lengthy process. In December 2005 the Center for Biological Diversity joined with two other US NGOs (Greenpeace and the Natural Resources Defense Council) to petition that the Arctic Polar Bear be listed on the ESA. The FWS under the Bush administration stretched the process out for years, missing many key deadlines and listing the species as "threatened" instead of endangered while the science was clearly in favor of an endangered listing. Facing mass public pressure and scientific consensus the FWS officially listed the species as endangered in May 2008.

==== Actions using the National Environmental Policy Act ====
The National Environmental Policy Act (NEPA) recognizes that actions taken by the US government can have significant environmental impact and requires that all federal agencies consider these environmental implications when doing "major federal actions". This can be done either through an environmental assessment (EA) or a more thorough environmental impact statement (EIS), how thorough the analyzation has to be depends on the nature of the proposed action.

==== Actions using the Clear Air Act ====
The Clean Air Act (CAA) regulates air pollutants both from stationary and mobile sources. The Act was passed in the 1970s before there was widespread knowledge about greenhouse gases (GHGs) but in 2007 the Supreme Court decided the EPA did have to regulate GHGs under the CAA due to the famous Massachusetts vs. The EPA case.

In 2009 the state of California was able to use the CAA to create stronger vehicle emission standards than the national standard, which quickly led to the Obama administration adopting these stricter emission standards on a national level. These standards were called the Corporate Average Fuel Efficiency (CAFE) standards and included regulations of GHGs.

==== Massachusetts v. EPA ====
Massachusetts v. Environmental Protection Agency before the Supreme Court of the United States allowed the EPA to regulate greenhouse gases under the Clean Air Act. A similar approach was taken by California Attorney General Bill Lockyer who filed a lawsuit California v. General Motors Corp. to force car manufacturers to reduce vehicles' emissions of carbon dioxide. This lawsuit was found to lack legal merit and was tossed out. A third case, Comer v. Murphy Oil USA, Inc., a class action lawsuit filed by Gerald Maples, a trial attorney in Mississippi, in an effort to force fossil fuel and chemical companies to pay for damages caused by global warming. Described as a nuisance lawsuit, it was dismissed by District Court. However, the District Court's decision was overturned by the United States Court of Appeals for the Fifth Circuit, which instructed the District Court to reinstate several of the plaintiffs' climate change-related claims on 22 October 2009. The Sierra Club sued the U.S. government over failure to raise automobile fuel efficiency standards, and thereby decrease carbon dioxide emissions.

==== Held v. Montana ====
Held v. Montana was the first constitutional law climate lawsuit to go to trial in the United States, on June 12, 2023. The case was filed in March 2020 by sixteen youth residents of Montana, then aged 2 through 18, who argued that the state's support of the fossil fuel industry had worsened the effects of climate change on their lives, thus denying their right to a "clean and healthful environment in Montana for present and future generations"^{:Art. IX, § 1} as required by the Constitution of Montana. On August 14, 2023, the trial court judge ruled in the youth plaintiffs' favor, although the state indicated it would appeal the decision. Montana's Supreme Court heard oral arguments on July 10, 2024, its seven justices taking the case under advisement. On December 18, 2024, the Montana Supreme Court upheld the county court ruling.

==== Mayanna Berrin v. Delta Air Lines Inc. ====
Mayanna Berrin v. Delta Air Lines Inc. is a civil action lawsuit about Delta Air Lines' claim of carbon neutrality.

=== Others ===
After the landmark ruling of the Netherlands in 2015, groups in other countries tried the same judicial approach. For instance, groups went to court in order to protect people from climate change in Brazil, Belgium, India, New Zealand, Norway, South Africa, Switzerland and the United States.

== Dismissed cases ==
There are also cases that have been dismissed, whether due to lack of standing (e.g. Carvalho v Parliament and Council, 2021) or due to the limits of judicial functions under the doctrine of the separation of powers (e.g. Juliana v United States, 2020).

=== Juliana v. United States ===
In 2015, a number of American youth, represented by Our Children's Trust, filed a lawsuit against the United States government, contending that their future lives would be harmed due to the government's inactivity towards mitigating climate change. While similar suits had been filed and dismissed by the courts for numerous reasons, Juliana v. United States gained traction when a District Judge Ann Aiken ruled that the case had merit to continue, and that "a climate system capable of sustaining human life" was a fundamental right under the United States Constitution. The lawsuit was eventually dismissed.

=== La Rose et al. vs. Her Majesty the Queen (Canada) ===
In October 2019, a group of 15 youths filed a lawsuit against the government of Canada, claiming that the government's lack of climate change action was a violation of their rights to life, liberty and equality. The lawsuit was dismissed in November 2020.

== Criticism and Backlash Litigation ==
See also: Strategic lawsuit against public participation.

Scholars have pointed out that there are also potential negative impacts of successful cases – sometimes referred to as backlash litigation. As the number of successful cases increases the energy transition risk to some companies operating in high-emitting sectors, it is possible that they will challenge government action on climate change. For example, they might argue that there was an alleged breach of international investment agreements even if governments' actions were taken to comply with a judicial decision. One example is the case of RWE v The Netherlands, in which RWE, a German energy company, filed suit against the Dutch government under the Energy Charter Treaty, alleging that the government failed to allow adequate time and resources to enable the company to transition away from coal.

A study from 2024 found that: "Nearly 50 of the more than 230 recorded cases filed in 2023 include non‑aligned arguments. The vast majority of these were filed in the US. At times, actors involved in such cases appear to be intentionally seeking to use legal tactics to obstruct climate action".

Backlash cases can also target climate activists directly. These include civil and criminal cases against protesters, as well as strategic lawsuits against public participation (SLAPPs) against individuals, journalists or NGOs who oppose fossil fuel projects. They may take the form of defamation, nuisance, trespass claims or vandalism charges, or court orders to stop protests. The United Nations Environment Programme has also published a report on the use of SLAPPs against environmental defenders in the Asia-Pacific region.

One well-known example of a SLAPP suit is Energy Transfer LP v. Greenpeace International. In March 2025, a jury found three Greenpeace entities liable for almost US$667 million in damages to the companies behind the Dakota Access Pipeline. The claims included trespass, nuisance, defamation and interference with business, all linked to Greenpeace's role in protests against the pipeline. In February 2025, Greenpeace International sued Energy Transfer in the Netherlands. This was the first case brought under the European Unions anti-SLAPP directive.

Courts have also ruled on how climate protests and the law fit together. In Olsen v. Police (2023), the High Court of New Zealand held that the right to peaceful protest, including protest over climate change, must be taken into account when deciding bail. In contrast, in 2023 courts in Vatican City and Switzerland convicted activists for damaging property and blocking roads. They found that protest must stay within legal limits, even when its goals are important. In Australia, New South Wales passed laws in 2022 that made it a crime to disrupt major roads and facilities during protests, with penalties of up to two years in prison. In December 2022, climate protester Deanna "Violet" Coco was jailed under these laws. She was sentenced to 15 months in prison for blocking one lane of the Sydney Harbour Bridge with a truck in April of that year. She spent 13 days in jail before being released on bail to appeal. In March 2023, the NSW District Court quashed the sentence and replaced it with a 12-month conditional release order. In December 2023, in Kvelde v State of New South Wales, the NSW Supreme Court struck down parts of the laws. It found they unfairly restricted the freedom of political communication implied in the Australian Constitution. The case was brought by two members of the "Knitting Nannas" climate protest group.

== See also ==
- Climate justice
- Environmental law
- Human rights and climate change
- Oslo Principles on Global Obligations to Reduce Climate Change
