= Pabai v Commonwealth =

2025 decision of the Federal Court of Australia

- Court: Federal Court of Australia
- Full case name: Pabai Pabai & Guy Paul Kabai v Commonwealth of Australia (No 2)
- Decided: 15 July 2025
- Citation: [2025] FCA 796

Court membership
- Judge sitting: Justice Wigney

Case opinions
- The Commonwealth does not owe the duties of care alleged. Loss of fulfilment of Ailan Kastom is not compensable in negligence.

Pabai v Commonwealth is a 2025 decision of the Federal Court of Australia concerning whether the Commonwealth of Australia owes a duty of care to Torres Strait Islanders who have experienced impacts from climate change, and whether damage to Ailan Kastom (Island Custom) can be compensated as harm under the law of negligence. It is an instance of climate change litigation.

Justice Wigney ruled in favour of the Commonwealth, finding that no duty of care was owed, and that loss of fulfilment of Ailan Kastom is not compensable in negligence. An appeal has been filed and is expected to be heard in July 2026.

== Background ==
=== Torres Strait Islands ===
The Torres Strait Islands are a cluster of islands off the northern coast of Australia. They have traditionally been inhabited by the Torres Strait Islander people. The islands have been subject to impacts arising from climate change, including sea level rise, impacts on marine environments, flooding, erosion, property damage, coral bleaching, displacement, and loss of food sources. The impacts of sea level rise are particularly acute, occurring twice as fast as the global average, coupled with the low-lying nature of some islands. Pabai's island is low-lying and has been identified as being subject to climate-related hazards.

=== Ailan Kastom ===
Ailan Kastom (Island Custom) is a tradition that is passed down by Torres Strait Islander people that preserves their connection to Country. It is defined in Queensland law as:

"the body of customs, traditions, observances and beliefs of Torres Strait Islanders generally or of a particular group of Torres Strait Islanders, and includes any such customs, traditions, observances and beliefs relating to particular persons, areas, objects or relationships."

Ailan Kastom impacts the management of the land and marine environment, and incorporates elements such as roles of marine species, including turtles and dugongs. Climate change has the potential to adversely impact cultural activities of the Torres Strait Islanders in various ways, including harm to cultural sites, impacts to burial grounds and graves, loss of food resources, mental health impacts, and reduced access to animals that have cultural importance from changing populations and migration patterns, undermining the "healthy ecosystem" that has a key role in Ailan Kastom.

=== Previous legal decisions ===
The United Nations Human Rights Committee had previously decided in 2022 that there has been a failure to protect certain rights of the Torres Strait Islander people under the International Covenant on Civil and Political Rights, due to inadequate measures to protect them from the impacts of climate change.

The Full Court of the Federal Court of Australia previously held in the 2022 case of Minister for the Environment v Sharma that the Minister did not owe a duty of care relating to climate change when approving projects under the Environment Protection and Biodiversity Conservation Act 1999, in part due to it relating to issues of 'core policy'.

== Case ==
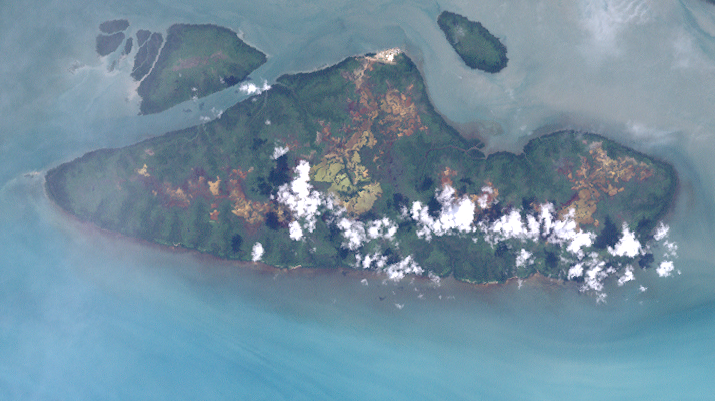
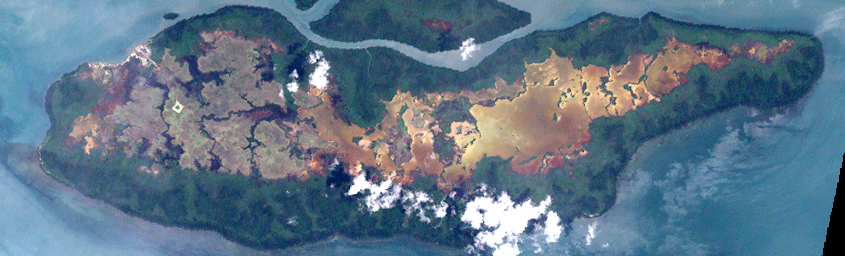
Aerial images of the islands of Boigu (top) and Saibai (bottom) where the applicants reside

=== Litigants ===
The case was brought by two Guda Maluyligal traditional owners from the Torres Strait Islands, Uncles Pabai Pabai and Paul Kabai, from the islands of Boigu and Saibai respectively. It was brought as a representative proceeding on behalf of all Torres Strait Islanders who have suffered damage. They were represented by Phi Finney McDonald. The defendant was the Commonwealth of Australia, represented by the Australian Government Solicitor.

=== Procedure ===
In an interlocutory decision, Justice Mortimer stated that "there is no denying the unremitting march of the sea onto the islands of the Torres Strait", and accepted the applicants' claim that evidence ought to be taken in the Torres Strait.

Hearings were held in June, November, and December 2023, and April–May 2024. These occurred at locations in the Torres Strait Islands, Melbourne, and Cairns.

=== Judgment ===
The decision was handed down by Justice Wigney on 15 July 2025 in Cairns.

Wigney declined to find either of the alleged duties of care or their respective breaches. On the primary case, Wigney found that the Commonwealth does not owe a duty of care to Torres Strait Islanders or their way of life from the current and projected impacts of climate change, and that this was not breached by the Commonwealth failing to enact greenhouse gas emission targets in accordance with the "best available science", being a limit of 2 °C above pre-industrial temperatures. On the alternative case, Wigney found that the Commonwealth does not owe a duty of care to Torres Strait Islanders to protect them from property damage or loss of fulfilment of Ailan Kastom through climate change adaptation, and that this was not breached by insufficient funding for seawalls on six islands in the Torres Strait Islands, including Boigu.

Wigney accepted many of the scientific claims made relating to climate change, its consequences, and the potential future of the Torres Strait Islands, much of which was not challenged by the Commonwealth. He also found that in setting various emission targets, the Commonwealth "failed to engage with or give any real or genuine consideration to what the best available science indicated was required for Australia to play its part" as required by the Paris Agreement, describing that science as "patently clear". He noted that the change in government resulted in a new approach which was "more ambitious". He concluded that the evidence did not show that, given Australia's relatively minor contribution to climate change, that excess emissions "materially contributed to any harm".

Regarding Ailan Kastom, Wigney said he had "considerable sympathy" to the applicants but went on to say that it was not open to him "sitting as a single judge of this Court" to find that the loss of fulfilment of Ailan Kastom was compensable in negligence.

The argument that colonialism created a "special protective relationship" between the Torres Strait Islanders and the Commonwealth above that of the general public was rejected, as were arguments relating to the Torres Strait Treaty.

=== Appeal ===
Following the applicants' dissatisfaction with the decision, an appeal to the Full Court of the Federal Court of Australia was filed on 11 November 2025. Hearings are expected to occur in late July 2026 in Melbourne.

== Reactions ==
The Minister for Climate Change and Energy Chris Bowen and Minister for Indigenous Australians Malarndirri McCarthy released a joint statement on the day of the decision stating that the decision was being "consider[ed]" without further comment. A media release from the Australian Greens expressed "disappoin[tment]" with the finding of no duty of care. Greens Senators Allman-Payne and Hodgins-May both expressed "deep solidarity" with the applicants in senate speeches following the decision. Independent MP Zali Steggall described the decision as "deeply disappointing".

== Significance ==
The case was one of several failed attempts to demonstrate novel duties of care relating to climate change, as the Court in both Pabai and Sharma held that climate change being an issue of 'core policy' was an important factor against the finding of a duty of care. Wigney referred to this as "high or core government policy or policymaking", concluding that the matters were not justiciable and that political action was the way to effect change. Academics have previously suggested that Sharma's reasoning may still permit the finding of duty if a "closer causal relationship between the risk and the harm" is demonstrated, noting that Pabai relied on negligence, native title, and the Torres Strait Treaty, and that the Torres Strait Islanders have been described as having "more immediate interests" than the youths in the Sharma case. The duties alleged have been described as "novel" and previously "unknown to Australian law", with consideration of the "salient features" of the relationship between the parties (relevant to the finding of a previously unrecognised duty of care) favouring a finding of no duty.

The case has been noted for its departure from other decisions internationally, such as those by the International Court of Justice. The effectiveness of climate change litigation in other European countries was not helpful in Pabai due to the differences in Australian negligence law.

Justice Pepper of the Land and Environment Court of New South Wales compared the decision to the 1932 case of Donoghue v Stevenson, arguing that both involved "novel legal issues in times of societal change" but that the risks in Donoghue were less "profound" compared with those in Pabai.

== See also ==
- Climate change in Australia
- Climate change litigation
- Negligence
- Torres Strait Islands
