= McGaughey and Davies v USS Ltd =

McGaughey and Davies v USS Ltd and Directors
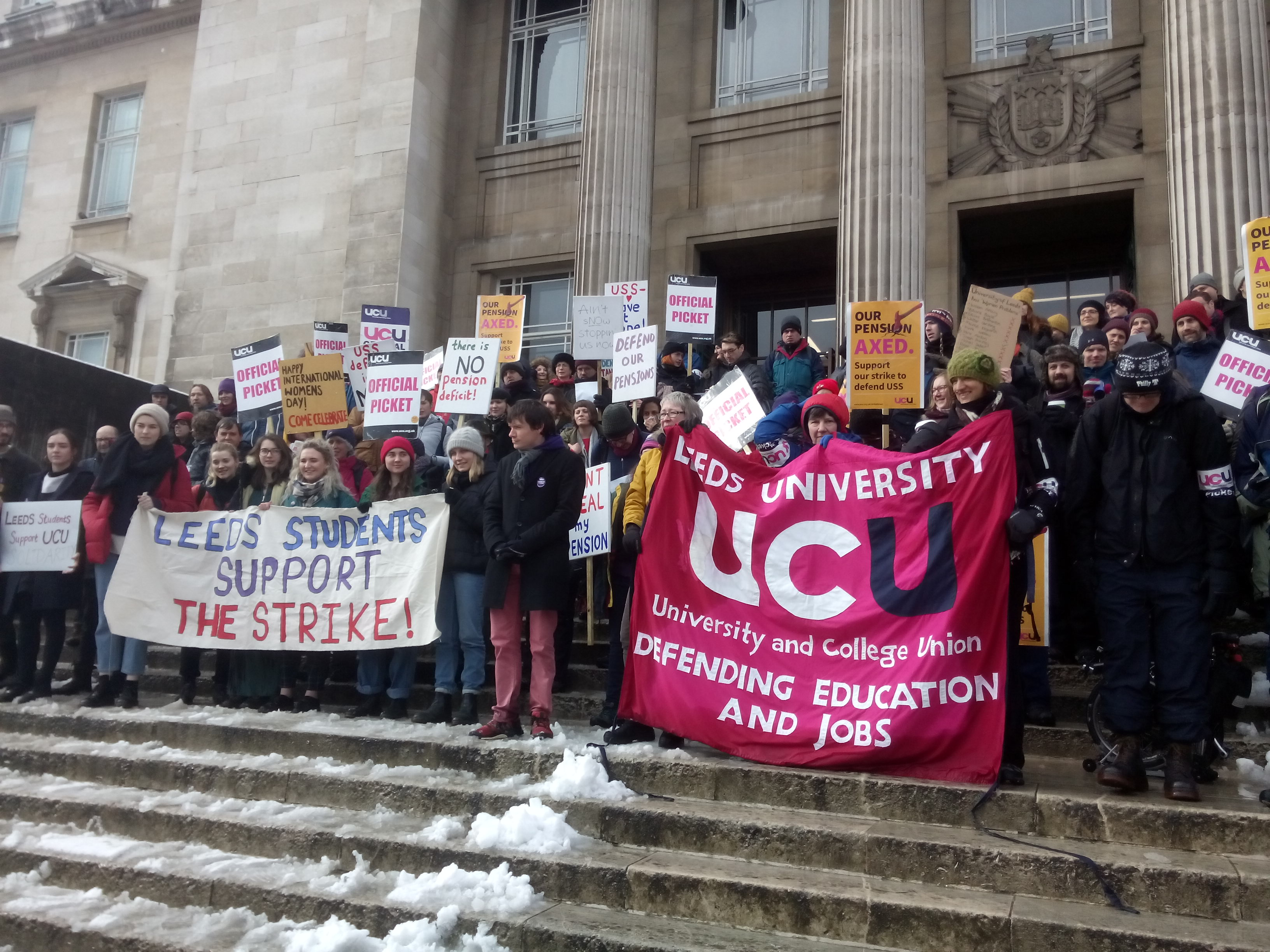
- Court: Court of Appeal
- Decided: May 2022
- Citations: [2023] EWCA Civ 873, [2022] EWHC 1233 (Ch)

Court membership
- Judge sitting: Asplin LJ

Keywords
- Climate litigation, derivative claim, Foss v Harbottle, Discrimination

McGaughey and Davies v Universities Superannuation Scheme Ltd and Directors [2023] EWCA Civ 873 is a UK company law, climate litigation, and pension law case, seeking permission for a derivative claim to enforce duties of the directors of the UK university pension fund, USS Ltd. The case was first to sue for directors of a major UK corporation to divest fossil fuels, and is the first case of beneficiaries of a pension corporation bringing a derivative claim for breaches of directors' statutory duties.

The High Court accepted that the claimants had standing to bring a derivative claim, but refused permission based on the rule in Foss v Harbottle. The claimants secured permission to appeal to the Court of Appeal with a hearing in June 2023, but were unsuccessful, as Asplin LJ held that the appropriate procedure was a "beneficiary derivative claim" where directors' duties may be held on trust. The fossil fuel risk claim was not addressed in substance but "well suited" for being brought as an action for breach of trust.

== Facts ==
The claimants alleged that directors of the Universities Superannuation Scheme Ltd had breached their statutory duties to act for proper purposes, act in good faith, and avoid conflicts of interest, and applied to bring a derivative claim in the company's name against the directors. Since 2018, major strikes took place in UK universities after the CEO Bill Galvin attempted to remove the guaranteed pension from university staff: this was halted after sector-wide strikes, and Oxford University staff threatened to remove the Vice Chancellor unless the pension cuts were opposed. Subsequently, the planned pension cuts were halted. In 2019, the board of USS Ltd voted to pass a special resolution to ensure that they could not be removed except by the existing board (rather than by university employers and the University and College Union). At a board meeting, the CEO Bill Galvin stated “DB pensions in the UK have failed. That is not controversial.” In March 2020, USS Ltd conducted a valuation of pension assets when the stock market had crashed due to the COVID-19 pandemic. This predicted that there would be a £17.9 billion deficit in the pension fund, on the assumption that assets would grow at 0.0% for 30 years (later changed to a 0.29% assumption). In November 2020, USS conducted an Ethical Investment Survey, which showed that a majority of university staff wished to divest from fossil fuels, but it did not act or publish the Survey results. As a result of the deficit predictions in the March 2020 valuation, USS and university employers proposed cutting pension benefits in April 2022. The claimants, Prof Neil Davies and Dr Ewan McGaughey, then filed their action after crowd-funding money for the claims that:

- conducting a valuation of assets with an assumption of 0.29% growth over the next 30 years and predicting deficits breached the duty to act for proper purposes under the Companies Act 2006 section 171(b),
- the resulting benefit cuts have a discriminatory impact on women, young people and on grounds of race, contrary to the duties in the Equality Act 2010 sections 19 and 61, and the duty to act for proper purposes,
- the directors wasted beneficiaries' money by inflating operating costs, contrary to the duty to avoid any possibility of a conflict of interest under the Companies Act 2006 section 175, and
- the directors unlawfully failed to divest or have any plan for divesting fossil fuels, which posed a "significant risk of financial detriment", in light of the right to life under the Companies Act 2006 section 171 and the Human Rights Act 1998 section 3, and in light of the beneficiaries' expressed preferences.

In March 2022, after the Russian invasion of Ukraine, USS announced £450 million of losses in Russian investments, including fossil fuels. In April 2022 it pressed ahead with cuts to the pension, reducing the defined benefit pension threshold from £60,000 to £40,000, reducing accrual rates from 1/75th of salary per year to 1/85th, and reducing the inflation cap, estimated to be a 30% cut to an average pension.

After the High Court hearing, and following the UK mini-budget, the CEO Bill Galvin announced his resignation.

== Judgment ==
=== High Court ===
Justice Leech in the High Court held that, while beneficiaries of a pension fund corporation could bring derivative claims, the Court of Appeal decision in Harris v Microfusion and the rule in Foss v Harbottle meant that the claimants had to show they suffered loss reflected by a loss to the company, and that the directors 'benefited themselves from the breach of duty'. It followed that the claimants' claims for breach of duty to act for proper purposes could not be brought, including the claims alleging misconduct in the valuation and discrimination, and claims alleging a significant risk of financial detriment in the failure to divest fossil fuels or have a plan. The Judge added that the claimants had failed to state sufficiently what the losses from fossil fuels were.

=== Court of Appeal ===
The claimants applied for permission to appeal to the Court of Appeal, and received permission from Lewison LJ for a hearing in 2023. The claimants alleged that the High Court applied the wrong legal tests, that all duties under the Companies Act 2006 must be capable of enforcement, and that key parts of their evidence on the imprudent valuation assumptions, and the risk of significant financial detriment from fossil fuels were missed.

The Court of Appeal held, Asplin LJ giving judgment, that the claimants ought to have pursued a "beneficiary derivative claim" rather than a common law company derivative claim. In a pathbreaking opinion, Asplin LJ held it was "not unarguable" that certain directors' duties that the claimants alleged were breached were capable of being held on trust by the trust fund (USS) for the benefit of the beneficiaries, and were therefore capable of enforcement by the claimants. However, this was separate from the company (USS Ltd) that was the corporate trustee where the directors sat, and the rules of procedure differed, in particular with more requirements to gather the views of other beneficiaries. The Court of Appeal did not analyse the substantive claims including on the risks associated with fossil fuel investment, but held that this was particularly apt for a beneficiary claim.

"Beneficiary Derivative Claims"

78. It is also helpful to bear in mind the circumstances in which a beneficiary of a trust may bring an action on its behalf. Trustees administer a trust as principals and not as agents for the beneficiaries, albeit as fiduciaries on behalf of the beneficiaries. The trustees, therefore, are usually the proper claimants in proceedings against agents or other third parties. See Lewin on Trusts 20th ed at 47-001 and Underhill and Hayton "Law of Trusts and Trustees" at 71.1. This applies just as much where the third party is a director of a corporate trustee of the trust who wrongfully and in breach of duty causes the corporate trustee to commit a breach of trust, as it applies to a third party: Lewin on Trusts 20th ed at 45-084 citing Bath v Standard Land Co Ltd [1911] 1 Ch 618.

79. Where the trustees are not mere bare trustees and they fail to pursue a claim which is vested in them as trustees, a beneficiary may commence an administration action against the trustees to compel them to take proceedings to enforce the claim. If there are questions about whether the trustees ought to sue, they will be determined by the court in accordance with the principles in Re Beddoe, Downes v Cotton [1893] 1 Ch 547. If the court is satisfied that the claim ought to be brought, it may direct the trustees to do so or give permission to the beneficiary to use the trustee's name. Lewin at 47-005.

80. There are other types of claim which are sometimes known as "beneficiary derivative actions". They arise where a beneficiary seeks to bring an action in his own name on behalf of the trust or estate, against a third party. The beneficiary sues in the right of the trust or estate and does not enforce duties owed to him directly. As Lord Collins of Mapesbury explained in Roberts v Gill [2011] 1 AC 240 at [21] the claimant in that case wished to take advantage of a passage in the speech of Lord Nicholls of Birkenhead in Royal Brunei Airlines Sdn Bhd v Tan [1995] 2 AC 378, 391 as follows: "for the most part [professionals] will owe to the trustees a duty to exercise reasonable skill and care. When that is so, the rights flowing from that duty form part of the trust property. As such they can be enforced by the beneficiaries in a suitable case if the trustees are unable or unwilling to do so."

81. As Lord Collins explained at [22]: "The action is a derivative action in which the beneficiary stands in the place of the administrator and sues in right of the estate and does not enforce duties owed to him rather than to the administrator."

82. That was a case in which the claimant commenced an action in his personal capacity as a beneficiary of his grandmother's estate, claiming damages in negligence against two firms of solicitors which had advised the estate's former personal representatives. After the relevant limitation period had expired, the claimant applied to amend the proceedings in order to continue them both in his personal capacity and on behalf of the estate as a derivative action.

83. In order to be entitled to bring such an action, the beneficiary must establish "special" or "exceptional" circumstances: Hayim v Citibank NA [1987] 1 AC 730, 748 and Roberts v Gill at [46] – [53]. The beneficiary cannot be in a better position than the trustee and just as the trustee could not sue the other beneficiaries against their interests, nor can a beneficiary do the same in the name of the trustee: Twigg v Franks (1916) 50 Ir Lt 173. Furthermore, the cause of action itself must be trust property: Bradstock Trustee Services Ltd v Nabarro Nathanson [1995] 1 WLR 1405 at 1411F.

84. The commentary in Lewin at 47-015 and 47-016 deals with the question of whether the views of other beneficiaries to the continuance of the action should be sought. It is stated that if there are other beneficiaries with substantial interests who may be prejudiced by the claim, for example, if trust assets would be vulnerable to a costs order against the trustees if the claim fails, there is a good argument to canvas the views of other beneficiaries, similar to the procedure in a Beddoe application.

85. The notes to the White Book at 19.14.2 state that a beneficiary derivative action of this kind falls within the definition of a representative action and so is governed by CPR Rule 19.8 and not by CPR Rule 19.14 - 20 (which applies to company derivative claims). Under CPR Rule 19.8 where more than one person has the same interest in a claim, the claim may be begun or the court may order that the claim be continued by or against one or more of the persons who have the same interest as the representatives or any other persons who have that interest. The Rule was comprehensively reviewed recently by the Supreme Court in Google LLC v Lloyd [2021] UKSC 50.

86. A case may raise the need for both a company derivative claim and a beneficiary derivative claim where a trustee is shareholder in a company and has grounds to commence a company derivative action in respect of a wrong done to the company, but fails to bring the action. In such circumstances, a beneficiary of the trust may seek, on behalf of the trustee as shareholder, to bring the company derivative claim against the alleged wrongdoer. In such a case, the beneficiary will be allowed to continue the claim where both the grounds for a derivative action under company law and for a derivative action under trust law are established. That was what happened in Popely v Popely [2018] EWHC 276 (Ch) at [98]- [116].

- "Dog-leg claims"

87. I have already mentioned "dog-leg" claims and how Mr Grant defined them. They are claims where it is alleged that a corporate trustee has a claim against its directors for breach of duty in causing the corporate trustee to commit a breach of trust and the benefit of the claim is held by the corporate trustee on trust for the beneficiaries. In HR & Ors v JAPT & Ors [1997] PLR 99, Lindsay J was not prepared to describe a dog-leg claim as unarguable. He concluded that whether a particular chose in action was or was not a trust asset did not involve an examination of high principles but consideration of the facts of the case. He distinguished the case of Young & Ors v Murphy & Anr [1994] 13 ACSR 722, on the basis that in HR the former corporate trustee had no separate assets or business and only had one trust of which it was trustee [78].

88. Young was a case which was heard in the Supreme Court of Australia. It was held that claims against directors of the former trust company for breach of duty to use reasonable care and skill arose only out of the director's office and was owed only to the trust company and was not trust property. The directors could not be said, on the basis of the pleading, to owe their duties to the company only in relation to a particular trust nor were the duties imposed upon them in relation to a particular item or items of trust property. There was no basis for assuming that the right of action was trust property. See Phillips J, with whom Brooking and Batt JJ agreed.

89. In Gregson v HAE Trustees Ltd & Ors [2009] 1 All ER (Comm) 457, however, Robert Miles QC, as he then was, held that a dog-leg claim had no real prospect of success. HAE was the trustee of a number of trusts, had outside creditors and was not set up for the purpose of acting as trustee of the particular trust. The deputy judge did not consider that the fact that HAE, under its constitution, was not allowed to make a profit and that its only function was to act as trustee, albeit of a number of trusts, justified the imposition of a trust in relation to the claim against the directors.

90. Dog-leg claims are dependent, therefore, upon whether the chose in action in relation to the breaches of duty by the directors is held by the trustee company on trust for the beneficiaries. Whether such a claim is arguable will turn upon the facts of the case. But as Lewin explains at 43-067, where the trustee company is a one trust, no asset company, created solely for the purpose of administering the trust in question, it is not unarguable that the company's claims against the directors may be held on trust, opening up the possibility of a dog-leg claim.

== Significance ==
The case was the first in the UK to bring actions against directors personally for their failure to divest fossil fuels in light of climate risk. Solicitors at Ince stated that despite the High Court's rejection, the case showed "there is an increasing momentum by activists, shareholders and others to hold them accountable for climate change."

On appeal to the Court of Appeal the case was described as having "immense significance" for the future of fossil fuels.

== See also ==
- Climate litigation
- 2018–2023 UK higher education strikes
- Lliuya v RWE AG (2015) Case No. 2 O 285/15 duty of power company in tort to compensate for climate damage
- Urgenda v State of Netherlands (20 December 2019) duty of state to cut emissions in line with Paris Agreement and right to life
- Neubauer v Germany (24 March 2021) 1 BvR 2656/18, duty on state to reduce carbon emissions faster than government required in Act to protect right to life and environment
- Smith v Fonterra Co-operative Group Ltd [2021] NZCA 552 duty of oil and power companies in tort to pay for climate damage
- Milieudefensie v Royal Dutch Shell (26 May 2021) duty of oil company in tort to cut emissions in line with Paris Agreement and right to life
