= Smith v Fonterra Co-operative Group Ltd =

NZ Supreme Court ruling

Smith v Fonterra Co-Operative Group Ltd
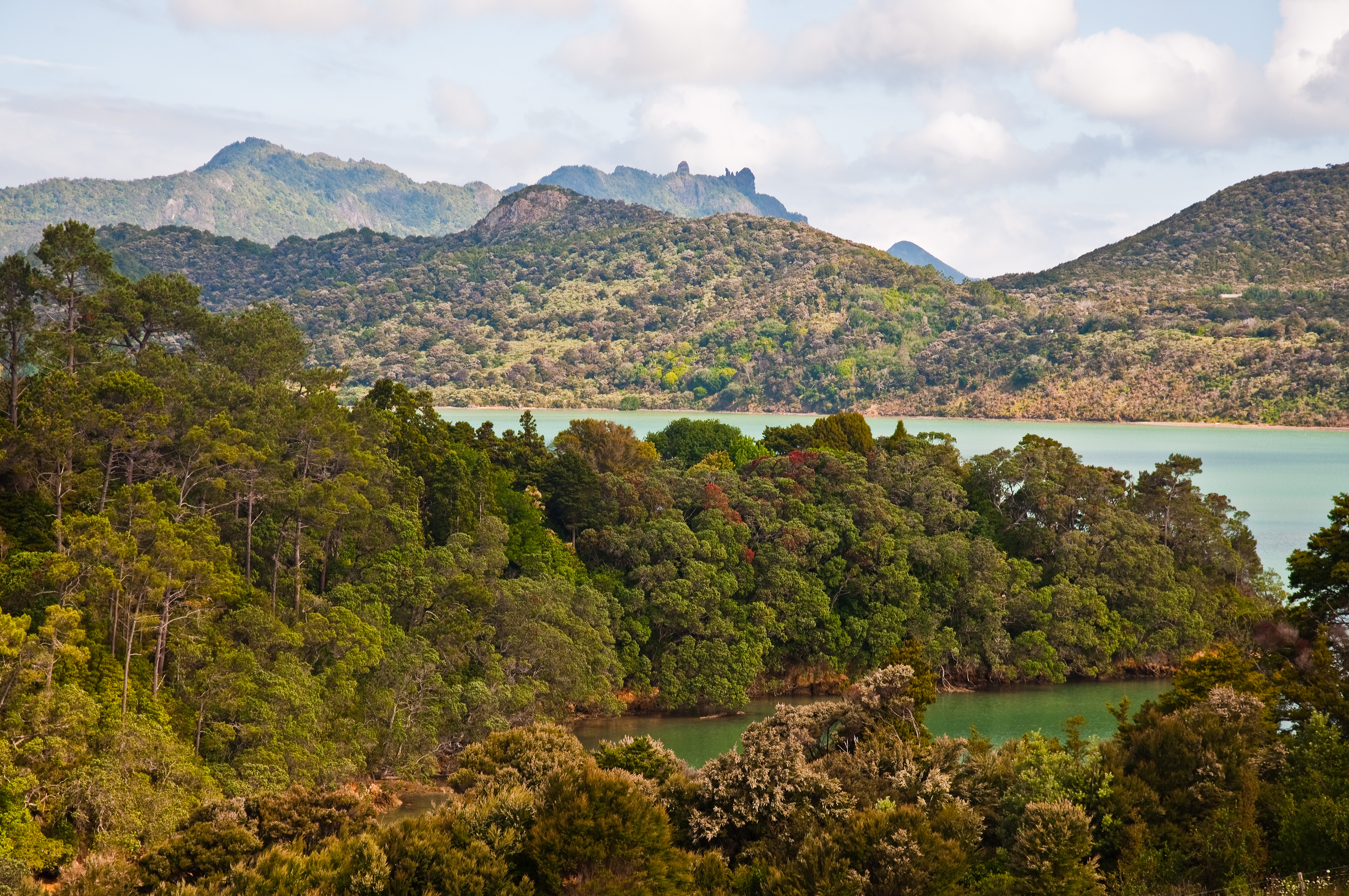
- Northland, NZ
- Court: Supreme Court of New Zealand
- Citations: [2024] NZSC 5., [2021] NZCA 552., [2020] NZHC 419.

Keywords
- Tort, climate damage

Smith v Fonterra Co-Operative Group Ltd [2024] NZSC 5. is a landmark New Zealand tort law case, concerning liability of major fossil fuel polluters for climate damage. The NZ Supreme Court held that polluting companies could be liable in tort to pay damages from global warming and rising sea levels to people whose coastal property is damaged, overturning courts below. However, in May 2026, the Government announced a law change which would prevent the case going ahead.

== Background ==
In 2019, climate change spokesman for the Iwi Chairs Forum, Mike Smith, filed a lawsuit against several companies in the High Court of New Zealand, on the basis that these companies were major greenhouse gas emitters contributing to climate change.

The claim was brought against New Zealand companies Fonterra, Dairy Holdings Ltd, Genesis Energy, NZ Steel, Z Energy, Channel Infrastructure, and BT Mining (jointly owned by Bathurst Resources and Talley's Group). Smith alleged that their contributions to climate change, through greenhouse gas emissions and supplying fossil fuels, constitute a public nuisance, negligence, and breach of a duty to cease contributing to climate change. Smith wanted the court to require these companies to reach net-zero emissions by 2030.

== Judgments ==
=== High Court ===
The High Court of New Zealand Auckland Registry dismissed first two claims of public nuisance and negligence, but allowed the third claim of a breach of duty to continue. High Court Judge Wylie J, giving judgment, stated that 'the defendants’ collective emissions are minuscule in the context of the global greenhouse gas emissions', that 'reasonable persons in the shoes of the defendants could not have foreseen the damage claimed by Mr Smith', and it was 'an unlikely or distant result of the defendants’ emissions'. This was a matter for legislation, because it "would require the Courts to engage in complex polycentric issues, which are more appropriately left to Parliament" and the "matters are well outside the normal realms of civil litigation."

92. ‘The most appropriately placed entity in this country to address the complex and collective problems presented by climate change is the Government. Only it can require the necessary collective action by emitters in this country, and action by the defendants alone, whether by Court order or otherwise, will not avoid the damage claimed.’

...

102. Mr Smith’s has made no attempt in pleading his third cause of action to refer to recognised legal obligations, nor to incrementally identify a new obligation by analogy to an existing principles. This, I suspect, is because such attempt cannot readily be made. The claimed duty of care is not obviously analogous to any existing duty of care and I doubt that its recognition could be described as a gradual or step by step expansion of negligence liability. The public policy reasons I have identified in [98] above in considering whether a duty of care in negligence can extend in the novel way claimed by Mr Smith, seem to me to create significant hurdles for him in trying to persuade the Court that a new legal duty should be recognised.

...

107. The Court would have to consider the extent to which each defendant should be responsible for supply chain emissions for which it is not directly responsible. It would have to guard against double counting between defendants (and entities overseas in the case of BT Mining) and potential future defendants in similar proceedings. The Court would have to select a methodology to apply to carbon dioxide equivalents, so that greenhouse gases could be meaningfully compared when taking into account the different effects of different emissions on global warming...

The Court would have to consider what if any trajectory of net emission reductions each defendant would be required to achieve between 2020 and 2030 (the target date suggested by Mr Smith). The Court would have to determine whether there should be uniform linear progression towards net zero, or whether and how the progression towards net zero should take into account each defendant’s circumstances that might suggest that a particular trajectory would be inappropriate or patently inequitable for one or more of the defendants.

=== Court of Appeal ===
The Court of Appeal held that common law requires incremental development, not a radical response. Mr Smith could not identify why the defendants should be singled out. It was accepted that none had materially contributed to climate change – and if their contribution were actionable, it would apply to every individual and business: all would have to achieve net-zero emissions. It would be a surprising result if every person and business in New Zealand could be brought before the courts for contributing to climate change and therefore restrained from doing so — such a situation would have tremendous social and economic consequences. Additionally, such restraint would have to be enforced and monitored by the courts, which would require some sort of emissions offset and trading regime parallel to the statutory regime. Actions would have to be brought on an ad hoc basis, which would be inherently inefficient and unjust. Climate change cannot be effectively addressed through tort law. It should only be addressed by the legislature.

According to the court:

every person in New Zealand — indeed, in the world — is (to varying degrees) both responsible for causing the relevant harm, and the victim of that harm.

=== Supreme Court ===
In February 2024, the Supreme Court ruled that Smith had the right to proceed with the case, and ruled that it would be reinstated, overturning the Court of Appeal and High Court. The ruling held that Smith had standing to pursue the defendants for damage to his property from climate change at trial, and held that there would be no strike-out of the various tort actions. It ruled that the claim of public nuisance would not be struck out, and that given the essential element of causation was provable, it was correct to also not strike out the claims in private nuisance and negligence.

The decision by the Supreme Court attracted international attention, due to the proposed new tort law claim of civil wrong caused by contributions to climate change.

== Climate law change ==
In May 2026, the New Zealand Government announced that they would be amending climate laws to prevent companies from being sued over damage caused by greenhouse gas emissions, effectively putting an end to this case. The Minister for Justice expressed that the law change was in order to provide certainty for businesses for their obligations around climate change. If enacted, the law change would apply to both current and future cases.

The Climate Change Response (Tort Liability) Amendment Bill was introduced to New Zealand Parliament under urgency, and passed its first reading on 2 July 2026. The legislation passed its third and final reading on 19 August 2026.

=== Response ===
A briefing provided to ministers in June 2025 from justice officials had advised the government not to get involved in the case or related policy reform. Following the announcement an open letter addressed to the government in response, which recommended the law change be reconsidered, was signed by over 100 lawyers, climate scientists, and legal academics. There have been requests for the United Nations to intervene with the legislation, with a complaint to the UN Special Rapporteur on Climate Change and Human Rights jointly filed by Smith, the National Iwi Chairs Forum Pou Tikanga, Climate Clinic Aotearoa, and Lawyers for Climate Action.

Smith has since filed proceedings with the High Court regarding the potential law change, expressing concern that the decision, and the process behind it, were unlawful.

=== Undisclosed briefing document ===
Documents released following the announcement revealed that in 2024 the Prime Minister's office received a briefing document regarding the case; however, this had been left out of an earlier Official Information Act request. Both Fonterra and Z Energy confirmed to reporters that they had provided a briefing document to the office regarding the case. It has been revealed that this document made suggestions for a potential law change, and was received by the Prime Minister's chief policy adviser at the time. The document was sent from a Fonterra staff member to the private email address of the staffer. A complaint was laid with the ombudsman about the undisclosed material. The complaint was upheld, with chief ombudsman John Allen recommending that the Prime Minister undertakes a review of the incident, and explore whether further documentation should be released.

== Related case law ==
- Lliuya v RWE AG (2015) Case No. 2 O 285/15, duty of power company in tort to compensate for climate damage
- Urgenda v State of Netherlands (20 December 2019), duty of state to cut emissions in line with Paris Agreement and right to life
- Neubauer v Germany (24 March 2021) 1 BvR 2656/18, duty on state to reduce carbon emissions faster than government required in Act to protect right to life and environment
- Milieudefensie v Royal Dutch Shell (26 May 2021) duty of oil company in tort to cut emissions in line with Paris Agreement and right to life
- McGaughey and Davies v Universities Superannuation Scheme Ltd [2022] EWHC 1233 (Ch), directors' duties to plan to divest fossil fuels in light of Paris Agreement and right to life

== See also ==
- Climate change litigation
