= Mayanna Berrin v. Delta Air Lines Inc. =

United States lawsuit

Mayanna Berrin v. Delta Air Lines Inc. is an ongoing civil action lawsuit brought by the law firm Haderlein and Kouyoumdjian LLP (on behalf of Mayanna Berrin) against Delta Air Lines. In their complaint, the plaintiffs argue that Delta Air Lines' advertising claim of carbon neutrality is false and misleading, in violation of California state advertising statutes.

From 2020 onwards, Delta Air Lines pledged to go carbon-neutral, subsequently branding itself as "the world's first carbon-neutral airline." This claim is being disputed by the plaintiff, Mayanna Berrin, who criticized Delta's claim as being false (alleging that Delta knowingly relied on carbon offsets that did not actually counteract emissions), and argued that the misleading statements led people to buy tickets on Delta flights, when they otherwise would not have done so. Delta, however, countered this argument by stating that the plaintiff's claim lacked legal merit, because the statutes they were accused of violating are preempted by the Airline Deregulation Act. Delta has filed a motion to dismiss the claims brought under the preempted statutes.

== Background ==
Airlines are becoming increasingly conscious of reducing and offsetting their respective emissions of greenhouse gasses, thereby reducing their impact on climate change. They hope to balance the amount of carbon emissions being produced by airlines with the amount of carbon each airline removes from the atmosphere. This balance is measured in carbon equivalent or CO_{2}e emissions. Airlines generally use emission reductions, carbon offsets, and investment in sustainable practices to strive towards achieving carbon neutrality. Emission reductions include the practices of investing in more fuel-efficient aircraft, optimizing flight routes, improving ground operations, and adopting sustainable aviation fuel to minimize the carbon footprint of each individual flight. Carbon offsets compensate for emissions that cannot be reduced, so airlines invest in reforestation projects, renewable energy generation, energy efficiency initiatives, and more. Airlines will also invest in creating sustainable practices within their own companies by utilizing more energy-efficient facilities and incorporating more environmentally friendly technologies in the production of aircraft (more fuel-efficient airplanes when replacing older aircraft), maintenance, etc.

Airline companies need to meet certain environmental and carbon emission standards to operate, or they will be charged for their excessive emissions. Not following, or adhering to, said standards may result in the airlines having to pay higher landing fees, or restrictions on how many flights will be allowed to depart, or arrive, at a given airport. A few airlines are legally required to report their carbon emissions; these include airlines that fly within the continent of Europe, and listed companies are required to report their emissions as well under the Companies Act 2006 (Strategic and Directors' Reports) Regulations 2013.

== Delta Air Lines' carbon neutrality claims ==
Since March 2020, the phrase "the world's first carbon-neutral airline" has been used by Delta many times. The Plaintiff's complaint states that Delta used it in their marketing (advertisements and merchandise) and public expressions (LinkedIn posts, press releases, and podcasts).

Delta, at the time, was involved in the voluntary carbon offset market to reach its goal. As of 2021, they claim they were entirely offsetting their carbon dioxide (CO_{2}) emissions through renewable energy, agricultural forestry, land use, and renewable offsets.

As of November 2023, Delta states they are committed to net-zero by 2050" on their sustainability webpage. They aim to achieve this by claiming that they are reducing 10 percent of fossil fuels and jet fuel with sustainable aviation fuel and replacing 20 aircraft that were used pre-2019 with 25 percent more fuel-efficient seat aircraft. Delta also aims to reduce 4,900,000 lb (2,200,000 kg) per year of single-use plastics by their switch to 100 percent recycled plastic bottle bedding, reusable service wear, and new, more sustainable types of wine and handcrafted kits.

Delta's carbon neutrality claims were discovered to possibly contain illegitimate carbon offset credits when more research was done. The plaintiff discovered that the offsets that Delta had been purchasing were provably false, due to a variety of problems. They were seen to not make a real impact, as these projects were to have occurred with or without the offsets being purchased, and these projects were seen to have nonimmediate effects which means that businesses like Delta are paying for future emissions reductions rather than current ones. Additionally, these offsets were seen to have inaccurate accounting and impermanent project lives. Because their carbon neutrality claim at the time was based on their use of these carbon offsets, this evidence is used to try and prove that the phrase was inaccurate and misleading.

== Lawsuit ==
This civil action lawsuit was filed by Mayanna Berrin (represented by attorneys Jonathan Haderlein and Krikor Kouyoumdjian) on May 30, 2023, in the United States District Court for the Central District of California against Delta Air Lines Inc. The judge assigned to the case is Maame Ewusi-Mensah Frimpong. On August 18, 2023, Delta motioned for dismissal of the case, which is currently pending a judicial decision. This case alleges that Delta's statements violateCalifornia's Consumers Legal Remedies Act ("CLRA"), Cal. Civil Code §§ 1750, et seq:

- (ii) violation of California's False Advertising, Business and Professions Code § 17500, et seq. ("FAL")
- (iii) Unlawful, unfair, and fraudulent trade practices in violation of California's Business and Professions Code § 17200."

Mayanna Berrin is a resident of Glendale, California who has purchased flights from the defendant on multiple occasions. She claims that before buying these tickets, she witnessed their use of the phrase "the world's first carbon-neutral airline" and it led her to believe that Delta was currently a carbon-neutral business.

Delta Air Lines is one of the leading airlines in the world. Headquartered in Atlanta, the airline flies regionally and internationally, including to the state of California where this case comes out of.

=== Summary of Mayanna Berrin's key arguments and evidence ===
- Delta has grossly misrepresented its impact on the environment to its consumers through its use of words across a variety of business aspects.
- Delta's use of the phrase "the world's first carbon-neutral airline" would lead consumers to believe that Delta is currently carbon-neutral, leading them to use this information when deciding which airline to purchase tickets from.
- Delta's collaboration with carbon offset companies has proven to have a wide variety of problems that led to Delta misrepresenting how much of an impact its actions have on the environment. Berrin cites proof from scientists and government regulators who back up this claim.
- Due to there being a market premium for sustainable brands, the putative class was wronged.

==== Summary of Delta's key arguments and evidence ====
- Although Delta has not filed any legal responses, a spokesperson has stated that they believe this lawsuit is without any legal merit and have motioned for dismissal of the case.
- This spokesperson has also stated that, on their own, Delta has already transitioned away from the carbon offsets brought up in this lawsuit and is using different measures to combat its emissions.

== Court decision and consequences ==
When addressing the possible liability of Delta in this case, there is no knowledge on whether they will be found guilty of misleading customers, as they have motioned for dismissal and the legal battle has just started as of November 2023, therefore, no real information on how the case will turn out is available. Delta continues to claim that the lawsuit has no legal merit and denies any allegations directed toward the company. However, the plaintiff's counsel has cited scientific and journalistic evidence that the carbon credit system in which Delta is involved has major holes that are not actually offsetting the amount of carbon promised to be offset.

At this point, there have been no repercussions to speak of in terms of fines, penalties, or corrective actions imposed on Delta. This court case may have negative impacts on Delta, as court cases typically come with fines, reparations, and legal fees associated with them.

The airline industry as a whole will be impacted as the existence of the lawsuit and any coverage may cause companies to become more concerned about whether the carbon credits they are purchasing are actually offsetting the emissions that they too claim they are.

== Public reaction and media coverage ==
Media sites like The Guardian, U.S. News & World Report, and many more have covered this story, and more articles are being published as this court case progresses. Due to the media bringing this case into the public eye, the general public may start to become more aware of the potential of unreliable carbon offset programs which has the potential for reactions both pro and against both sides of this case.

This case is another example of the public outcry over greenwashing litigation. Climate change litigation or greenwashing litigation is the process by which the public and government hold large corporations accountable for their levels of emissions or exaggerated claims of emissions reductions or offsets. As a result of this lawsuit, consumers have become more aware of airlines' effects on the environment and the exaggerated business realm of carbon offset companies in places like India and Indonesia that are not following through on carbon emissions offset goals.

== Impact on the airline industry ==
The lawsuit against Delta Air Lines has the potential to bring up the veracity of carbon neutrality claims made by airlines as further research into their credibility. As a result, other airlines may encounter allegations similar to those Delta is currently facing. Companies will likely become more cautious when making carbon-neutral or environmentally friendly assertions in their marketing materials.

Furthermore, airlines may want to provide more transparent and verifiable data concerning their claims of carbon neutrality. This could involve sharing detailed information about their emissions reduction strategies and the specific carbon offset projects they support to try and gain the trust of environmentally concerned individuals. New regulations may also be implemented by regulatory bodies that want to become more proactive in monitoring and regulating carbon neutrality claims in the airline industry. This could lead to stricter enforcement of existing regulations or the development of new guidelines to ensure accurate and transparent reporting of environmental efforts. The Carbon Offsetting and Reduction Scheme for International Aviation (CORSIA) program, operated by the International Civil Aviation Organization, which is aimed at addressing international aviation emissions, may also receive renewed attention and scrutiny.

The Mayanna Berrin v. Delta Air Lines Inc. case may serve as an example of how legal action can impact the airline industry's advertising practices, regulatory landscape, and consumer awareness concerning carbon neutrality if this case continues in court, either way it goes. Airlines may need to adapt to a changing environment where the accuracy of their environmental claims is scrutinized and adherence to industry standards and regulations is essential. Ultimately, this case may lead to a more transparent and accountable approach to environmental responsibility in the airline industry, benefiting both the environment and consumers, but as of now, no real impact is known.

== See also ==
- Energy efficiency in transport
- Climate Change Litigation
- Carbon Offsetting and Reduction Scheme for International Aviation
- Carbon offsets and credits
