= Urgenda Foundation v State of the Netherlands =

Dutch court case about carbon dioxide emissions

- Court: Supreme Court of the Netherlands
- Decided: 20 December 2019
- ECLI: ECLI:NL:HR:2019:2006
- Transcript: ECLI:NL:HR:2019:2007

Case history
- Appealed from: District Court of The Hague
- Appealed to: Hague Court of Appeal

Urgenda Foundation v State of the Netherlands (2019) (in Dutch: Klimaatzaak Urgenda) is climate change litigation heard by the Supreme Court of the Netherlands related to government efforts to curtail carbon dioxide emissions. The case was brought against the Dutch government in 2013, arguing the government, by not meeting a minimum carbon dioxide emission-reduction goal established by scientists to avert harmful climate change, was endangering the human rights of Dutch citizens as set by national and European Union laws.

The initial ruling in 2015, requiring the government to meet an emissions goal of 25% reduction from 1990 levels by 2020, was upheld through the Supreme Court on appeals, affirming that reduction in emissions was necessary for the Dutch government to protect human rights. It is the first such tort case taken against a government challenging climate change aspects based on a human rights foundation, and the first such successful climate justice case.

== Background ==
The United Nations' Intergovernmental Panel on Climate Change (IPCC) issued its fourth and fifth assessment reports on climate change in 2007 and 2014, respectively. Among other findings, the reports emphasized the need for significant reduction in carbon dioxide emissions in the short-term, by 2030. The European Union (EU) established a goal for all member states to achieve a 40% reduction from 1990 levels by 2030, ahead of the 2016 Paris Agreement which established a similar goal worldwide. Each member state, including the Netherlands, was bound to establish its own national-level policies ahead of the Paris agreement to reach this goal.

The Netherlands had generally been seen as a leading country in trying to limit climate change as much of the country sits at or below sea level and would be significantly impacted by rising ocean levels. During the 2010s, activists asserted that the government started to favor more traditional fossil fuel industries over renewables, and the country began lagging in its commitment to reducing climate change.

The Urgenda Foundation is a climate activist group founded in 2008 representing the interests of 886 Dutch citizens. They had been following the IPCC assessment reports and other climate change reports, as well as the discussion by their attorney, Roger Cox, in his 2010 book Revolution Justified: Why Only the Law Can Save Us Now describing potential routes to seek climate change action by governments through climate justice, the idea that human rights are violated by governments' failure to reduce emissions and prevent climate change. Urgenda wrote to the Dutch government urging them to commit to a 40% reduction in carbon dioxide levels by 2020. The letter not only referred to recent reports like the IPCC assessment, but also implored that the Dutch government had a duty to reduce emissions to protect human rights under EU policy. This is the first-known instance of using the EU's human rights laws in seeking government action towards climate change.

The government, in reply, stated that this target was too aggressive compared to the planned 30% by 2020 target the EU was striving for at the time, and that the country would only commit to a 40% if all other EU member countries had the same objective.

== District Court ==
Urgenda sued the state in September 2013, arguing the state must commit to a reduction of carbon dioxide emissions of 40% by 2030 or a minimum of 25% by 2020, bound by Dutch and EU law. Urgenda's complaint asserted that the government was responsible for managing all carbon dioxide emissions from the country and it was duty-bound by their laws to reduce the nation's contribution to climate change.

The first hearing for the case was held in April 2015 at the District Court at The Hague. The District Court ruled in June 2015 in favor of Urgenda, and required the Netherlands government must achieve 25% reduction in carbon dioxide emissions from 1990 levels by 2020. The Court found that prior to 2010, the state had planned to have 30% reductions by 2020, but since 2010, had changed their policy and reduced the goal to 14–17%. While the state had argued that the Netherlands' net contribution of carbon dioxide emissions was not as significant as other major countries, the Court said in its ruling "The state should not hide behind the argument that the solution to the global climate problem does not depend solely on Dutch efforts. Any reduction of emissions contributes to the prevention of dangerous climate change and as a developed country the Netherlands should take the lead in this." The ruling asserted that the Dutch government was legally bound to reduce emissions to protect human life, and that the costs associated with a 25% reduction were not unreasonably high. The court did express concern about respecting the legislative process, and set the requirement to 25%, the minimum that IPCC and other reports estimated was possible for developed countries that was necessary to prevent dangerous climate change.

== Court of Appeals ==
The Dutch government appealed the ruling over multiple actions through 2018 to the Court of Appeals at the Hague. The state argued that the District Court's orders exceeded the trias politica, the Dutch's separation of powers, by creating environmental policy through its rulings. In these appeals, Urgenda further stressed the human rights issue, and introduced assertions that the Dutch government was bound by Articles 2 and 8 of the European Convention on Human Rights (ECHR) to address emissions, which the state refuted. The Court of Appeals ruled in October 2018 upholding the 25% emissions reduction order. The Court of Appeals rejected the state arguments that the order exceeded the separation of powers: the ruling was non-specific and did not specify the legislation of how to achieve the target, and because the matter was related to human rights, including those from the ECHR, the courts had the authority to issue such rulings.

== Supreme Court ==
The state then lodged an appeal to the Supreme Court of the Netherlands. The Supreme Court issued its rejection of the appeal on 20 December 2019 and upholding the 25% reduction requirement. In its ruling, the Supreme Court affirmed that the Dutch government was responsible for management of carbon dioxide emissions for the country and was bound to protect human rights. The ruling reiterated from the Court of Appeals that "every country is responsible for its share" of emissions.

A key part of the judgment rejected that because other countries would cause global warming whatever the Netherlands did, that the state did not have responsibility.

5.7.7 Partly in view of the serious consequences of dangerous climate change (...), the defence that a state does not have to take responsibility because other countries do not comply with their partial responsibility, cannot be accepted. Nor can the assertion that a country's own share in global GHG emissions is very small and that reducing emissions from one's own territory makes little difference on a global scale, be accepted as a defence. Indeed, acceptance of these defences would mean that a country could easily evade its partial responsibility by pointing out other countries or its own small share. If, on the other hand, this defence is ruled out, each country can be effectively called to account for its share of emissions and the chance of all countries actually making their contribution will be greatest, in accordance with the principles laid down in the preamble to the UNFCCC (...). 5.7.8 Also important in this context is that, as has been considered (...) about the carbon budget, each reduction of GHG emissions has a positive effect on combating dangerous climate change, as every reduction means that more room remains in the carbon budget. The defence that a duty to reduce GHG emissions on the part of the individual states does not help because other countries will continue their emissions cannot be accepted for this reason either: no reduction is negligible.

== Impact ==
=== In the Netherlands ===
As the case was sent to the Supreme Court, the Dutch government began enacting measures to meet the emissions target. Already planning on banning coal power plants by 2030, the government ordered the shutdown of the Hemweg plant in 2020, four years earlier than planned. Starting from discussions in December 2018, the Dutch government passed a new climate plan in June 2019, targeting 49% carbon dioxide emissions reduction by 2030. This plan includes taxes on industries on carbon dioxide emissions, transiting from gas to electric power through incentives, and pay-per-use driving taxes as early as 2025.

Even with enacted changes, the Netherlands Environmental Assessment Agency reported in January 2019 that they projected that carbon dioxide emissions reductions would reach between 19 and 26% from 1990 by the end of 2020, leaving the state in need of more steps to assure the target is met. The rulings in the case, while binding the government to meet the 25% reduction, did not specify what actions exist should the government miss that target. A spokesperson for Urgenda stated they did not inquire about penalties for the government failing to make the target, as they "consider that there is no reason that the government does not respect the decision of the highest court of justice in the Netherlands".

=== Global ===
While not the first climate change litigation, the original 2015 ruling against the Netherlands was heralded worldwide as the first successful tort action against a government to address climate change to protect human rights, an area otherwise known as climate justice. The ruling on the Netherlands case led to similar climate justice lawsuits in other countries, including Belgium, France, Ireland, Germany, New Zealand, Britain, Switzerland and Norway.

== See also ==
- Oslo Principles on Global Obligations to Reduce Climate Change
- Climate change litigation
- Lliuya v RWE AG (2015) Case No. 2 O 285/15 duty of power company in tort to compensate for climate damage
- Neubauer v Germany (24 March 2021) 1 BvR 2656/18, duty on state to reduce carbon emissions faster than government required in Act to protect right to life and environment
- Smith v Fonterra Co-operative Group Ltd [2021] NZCA 552 duty of oil and power companies in tort to pay for climate damage
- Milieudefensie v Royal Dutch Shell (26 May 2021) duty of oil company in tort to cut emissions in line with Paris Agreement and right to life
- McGaughey and Davies v Universities Superannuation Scheme Ltd [2022] EWHC 1233 (Ch), directors' duties to plan to divest fossil fuels in light of Paris Agreement and right to life
