= Asghar Leghari vs. Federation of Pakistan =

Climate change litigation important to human rights principles

- Court: Lahore High Court
- Decided: September 4, 2015

Asghar Leghari vs. Federation of Pakistan was a 2015 case in Pakistan in which the Lahore High Court ruled that the government was violating the National Climate Change Policy of 2012 and the Framework for Implementation of Climate Change Policy (2014-2030) by failing to meet goals set by the policies. In response, a Climate Change Commission was ordered to be formed in order to help Pakistan meet its climate goals.

== Background ==
A law student in the Punjab region of Pakistan, Asghar Leghari had his and his neighbors' crops threatened by water scarcity and storms that were intensified by climate change. He filed a petition saying that his fundamental rights were violated through the neglect of climate change policy.

He wrote that the government had shown "inaction, delay and lack of seriousness" in the face of the challenges posed by climate change. Leghari thought that this inaction threatened the food, water and energy security of the nation.

Previously, climate change policy was left up to individual provinces. However, a study by Lahore University of Management Sciences and the WWF found that no provinces had a policy in place.

== Decision ==
It was ruled that the government needed to enforce the 2012 policy. Judge Syed Mansoor Ali Shah from the High Court said that climate change “appears the most serious threat faced by Pakistan”. The judge required every department to nominate a person to ensure that the policies were implemented and to create a list of "action points" by December 31, 2015.

The decision also created a Climate Change Commission, made up of NGOs, technical experts and representatives of ministries in order to keep track of the government's progress.
