= Rosmarie Wydler-Wälti =

Rosmarie Wydler-Wälti (born 19 March 1950) is a Swiss environmentalist from Basel. In April 2024, as co-president of the Swiss organization Klimaseniorinnen (Senior Women for Climate Protection) she succeeded in winning a case in the European Court of Human Rights, arguing that Switzerland had failed to meet emission reduction targets in the face of increasing heatwaves. As a result, although the Swiss parliament later rejected the ruling, she was included on the BBC's 2024 list of 100 most inspiring and influential women.

== Early life ==
Born on 19 March 1950 in Basel, Rosmarie Wydler-Wälti was raised in a middle-class district near the River Birs. She met her future husband, the councillor Christoph Wydler, in the choir at her local church. When 23, she became pregnant while working as a kindergarten teacher and spent the next 12 years raising her four children.

== Activism ==
As interest in the anti-nuclear and feminist movements developed in the 1970s, she took part as an activist. She went on to demonstrate against Nestlés infant milk powder scandal and was later active in Davos, protesting against the World Economic Forum. Around 2010, she visited Tibet as she developed an interest in Buddhism side-by-side with her belief in Christianity.

In 2016, now a grandmother, she joined the Verein Grossmütterrevolution (Grandmothers' Revolution Association) which was invited by Greenpeace to sue the Swiss government for failing to meet climate protection targets. Together with 150 other women, she and Anne Mahrer created the association Senior Women for Climate Protection. After their suits failed in the Swiss courts, they filed a case with the European Court of Human Rights in Strasbourg. In April 2024, now numbering some 2,000 women, the association won the case, achieving a historic victory. Surprised at the outcome, Wydler-Wälti commented: "We keep asking our lawyers, 'Is that right?' And they tell us, 'It’s the most you could have had. The biggest victory possible'".

Although the lower house of the Swiss parliament voted on 12 June to disregard the ruling, the BBC concluded that "the case set a new precedent for climate litigation".
