= Milieudefensie v Royal Dutch Shell =

Dutch legal case (2021)

Milieudefensie et al v Shell
- Court: District court of The Hague
- Decided: 26 May 2021
- ECLI: ECLI:NL:RBDHA:2021:5337
- Transcript: ECLI:NL:RBDHA:2021:5339(English)

Court membership
- Judges sitting: Larisa Alwin, Irene Kroft and Michiel Harmsen

Case opinions
- The policy, policy intentions and ambitions of Royal Dutch Shell* (hereafter Shell) are incompatible with Shell's reduction obligation. The claimed order to comply with that obligation must be allowed. The order is declared provisionally enforceable. * After losing in the Hague District Court, Shell dropped "Royal Dutch" from its name, and moved its headquarters to London.[15]

Milieudefensie v Royal Dutch Shell (2021) is a human rights law and tort law case heard by the district court of The Hague in the Netherlands in 2021 related to efforts by several NGO's to curtail carbon dioxide emissions by multinational corporations. It was brought by the Dutch branch of Friends of the Earth and a group of other NGO's against the oil corporation, Shell plc. In May 2021, the court ordered Shell to reduce its global carbon emissions from its 2019 levels by 45% by 2030, relating not only to the emissions from its operations, but also those from the products it sells.

However, on 12 November 2024, The Hague's appeals court dismissed the 2021 ruling that had required Shell to cut its emissions, determining that there was no "societal standard of care" to enforce specific emissions reductions on Shell.

== Facts ==
Following the global adoption of the Paris Agreement in 2015, which aimed to limit the rise in the global average temperature to under 1.5 °C through various milestones at 2050, large corporations operating in signatory countries began evaluating if they could alter operations to meet the targets of the Agreement. The British multinational Shell is one of the largest oil and gas companies in the world; its headquarters are in the United Kingdom since 2022. Shell is the ninth-largest corporate contributor to global pollution, producing about 2.5% of global emissions. As the Paris Agreement was being developed, Shell evaluated its businesses to determine what it could do to address emissions, but had stated in 2014 that it believed that the Paris targets were unattainable and did not plan to change its business model away from oil and gas. Following the signing of the Agreement, Shell issued a statement that it would address its CO_{2} emissions, releasing a plan that called for reductions of its carbon dioxide emissions by 30% by 2035, compared to 2016 levels, and by 65% by 2050.

Seven environmental organisations – Milieudefensie (the Dutch branch of Friends of the Earth), Greenpeace, Fossielvrij, Waddenvereniging, Both ENDS, Jongeren Milieu Actief, and ActionAid – and 17,379 individual claimants in the Netherlands filed a class-action lawsuit against Shell in April 2019, arguing that Shell should change its business model to reach an emissions reduction target of 45% by 2030 in line with the Paris Agreement. By failing to change, the plaintiffs argued, Shell had failed to uphold the unwritten duty of care laid down in Book 6 Section 162 of the Burgerlijk Wetboek (Dutch Civil Code) as well as articles 2 and 8 of the European Convention on Human Rights. Shell stated in response to the summons that it was doing its part to address climate change, and that "What will accelerate the energy transition is effective policy, investment in technology and changing customer behaviour. None of which will be achieved with this court action. Addressing a challenge this big requires a collaborative and global approach."

Hearings at the district court at The Hague were held in December 2020. The plaintiffs were required under Dutch law to demonstrate that a viable alternative business model existed for Shell to achieve the suggested 45% reduction goal, and had used the recent transformation of Danish company Ørsted from fossil fuels to renewables as a viable example. During the trial, Shell issued a pledge in February 2021 to be net-zero by 2050. Plaintiffs considered Shell's pledge to be inadequate as the company would still fail to meet the Paris Agreement goals.

== Judgment ==
The Hague District Court ordered that Shell's current sustainability policy was insufficiently "concrete", and that its emissions were greater than that of most countries. Due to these factors, the court ordered that Shell must indeed reduce its global emissions by 45% by 2030 compared to 2019 levels; the reduction targets include emissions from its operations and products. The court declared the order provisionally enforceable, meaning that the order has immediate effect, even if one of the parties appeals the ruling.

The Court said the following:

... every emission of CO_{2} and other GHGs, anywhere in the world and caused in whatever manner, contributes to this [environmental] damage and its increase” (insertion added) and that “the (…) circumstance that RDS [Royal Dutch Shell, the respondent] is not the only partly responsible for tackling dangerous climate change (…) does not absolve RDS of its individual partial responsibility to contribute to the fight against dangerous climate change according to its ability.

== Significance ==
The case was considered a landmark ruling in environmental law related to climate change: while previous lawsuits against governments have prevailed for enforcing a more effective climate policy, this was considered the first major lawsuit to hold a corporation to the tenets of the Paris Agreement. As such, it contributes to the growing field of climate litigation. While the decision only has jurisdiction in the Netherlands, although pertaining to Shell's global operations, it could set a precedent for other environmental lawsuits against other large companies with high emissions that have not taken sufficient steps to reduce their emissions. The impact of the court's decision was considered by legal experts to be strengthened due to its reliance on human rights standards and international measures on climate change.

The ruling was regarded as a "rare and therefore significant success against a carbon major". However, Dutch courts have refused to consider the impacts of climate change beyond the Netherlands.

This case is an example for a court that has approached the temperature goal in Article 2 of the Paris Agreement as a benchmark. The court has pointed out that a state's failure to take measures consistent with this goal is a violation of mitigation obligations arising, for instance, from tort or human rights law.

After losing in the Hague District Court, Shell dropped "Royal Dutch" from its name, and moved its headquarters to London. It said the choice was not due to losing the case.

== Appeal and reversal ==
Shell appealed the ruling. The hearings of the appeal case took place in April 2024. On 12 November 2024, a Dutch appeals court dismissed a 2021 ruling that had required Shell to cut its absolute carbon emissions by 45% by 2030, relative to 2019 levels, including emissions resulting from the use of its products. The Hague's appeals court ruled that Shell, while obligated to limit emissions to protect citizens, was not bound by a specific reduction target. The court found no "social standard of care" requiring Shell to reduce emissions by an exact percentage, though it acknowledged Shell’s responsibility under human rights to help prevent dangerous climate change. Although the court in The Hague acknowledged Shell’s responsibility to reduce greenhouse gas emissions, it found that imposing a broad reduction target was unwarranted. Shell argued that targeting a single company for a global issue was unrealistic, stressing that emissions policy should be directed at governments.

== See also ==
- EU law
- Lliuya v RWE AG (2015) Case No. 2 O 285/15 duty of power company in tort to compensate for climate damage
- Urgenda v State of Netherlands (20 December 2019) duty of state to cut emissions in line with Paris Agreement and right to life
- Neubauer v Germany (24 March 2021) 1 BvR 2656/18, duty on state to reduce carbon emissions faster than government required in Act to protect right to life and environment
- Smith v Fonterra Co-operative Group Ltd [2021] NZCA 552 duty of oil and power companies in tort to pay for climate damage
- McGaughey and Davies v Universities Superannuation Scheme Ltd [2022] EWHC 1233 (Ch), directors' duties to plan to divest fossil fuels in light of Paris Agreement and right to life
- Greenpeace v. Eni, a similar 2024 case In Italy
