= Milieudefensie =

Dutch environmental organisation

- Founded: 1971
- Type: Environmental organization
- Headquarters: Netherlands

Milieudefensie (Dutch for "environmental defense") is a Dutch environmental organisation, founded on 6 January 1971, by a group of scientists in response to a report by the Club of Rome. It is the Dutch branch of Friends of the Earth. Milieudefensie is part of the 30 national organisations that Friends of the Earth Europe represents and unites at the European level.

Milieudefensie's mission is a good life for all people on earth and for generations to come. Its focus is on climate justice, more specifically a fair distribution of the benefits and burdens of solutions to the climate crisis. In recent years its focus is specifically on corporate accountability in relation to the climate crisis.

Milieudefensie has approximately 90,000 members and a support base of 175,000 people. It engages its support base in its activities, which are a combination of public campaigns, legal actions and political lobbying.

== Milieudefensie v Shell: the climate case ==
In 2018, Milieudefensie started a lawsuit against fossil fuel company Shell to hold the company responsible for its share in the climate crisis, and to demand that it makes climate plans in line with internationally agreed targets. In 2021, the judge's verdict stated that Shell has to reduce its CO_{2} emissions by 45% by 2030, compared to 2019 figures. This applies also to scope 3 emissions, or the emissions caused by the use of Shell's products.

International media stated that "Shell's historic loss in The Hague is a turning point in the fight against big oil" and that the case is "the most dramatic turning point" among a number of climate-related court cases that will lead "oil giants toward a 'tipping point'". The case has inspired other lawsuits, including one against Italian oil major Eni.

Shell appealed the ruling of the court. Hearings took place in April 2024 and the court decided in Shell´s favor on 12 November 2024. The judges saw Shell not fully responsible for the CO_{2} "scope 2" and "scope 3" emissions caused by suppliers and customers and an actual obligation to reduce these emissions by a fixed percentage would be out of scope. The judges stated, that competitors could take market shares from Shell by selling more coal and gas in the process, which would not result in a reduction of CO_{2} emissions.

== Milieudefensie v ING Bank ==
In January 2024, Milieudefensie issued a notice of liability to the Dutch bank ING. Milieudefensie considers ING a Global Systemically Important Bank that has a duty of care with regard to climate change. It argues that ING should take climate action that will lead to a reduction of its CO_{2} emissions of 48% by 2030 as compared to 2019. This is a slightly larger figure than in the Shell case, because it reflects the most up to date science. The case largely follows the same legal strategy as the case against Shell.

== People power ==
Milieudefensie works with its support base to put pressure on large companies and on politicians to act according to climate agreements. Milieudefensie's strategy is based on 'people power': when a large number of people speaks out for a certain demand, it will become impossible for companies and politicians to ignore that demand. In recent years, it has among others:

- co-organized the largest climate demonstration in Dutch history (on 12 November 2023, with 85,000 participants);
- attended large companies' shareholder meetings to ask the boards whether they intend to reduce their CO_{2} emissions by 45%;
- organized the 'manifest for climate justice' which has been signed by over 80,000 people.

== International work ==
Milieudefensie works internationally in two alliances: the Green Livelihoods Alliance and the Fair, Green and Global alliance. Milieudefensie also lobbies for international and EU legislation and guidelines. Among others, they provided input on the revised OECD Guidelines for Multinational Enterprises 2023 and on the EU Corporate Sustainability Due Diligence Directive.

== See also ==
- Milieudefensie et al v Royal Dutch Shell
