= Neubauer v Germany =

Court case in Germany

- Court: German Constitutional Court
- Started: February 6, 2020
- Decided: 24 March 2021
- Citation: 1 BvR 2656/18

Neubauer v Germany (also the Klimaschutz case) is a landmark German constitutional law case, concerning the duty of the German federal government to take action to prevent climate damage. In this court case, which was decided on 24 March 2021, a group of activists sued over the vagueness present in the 2019's Climate Protection Act. The German Constitutional Court declared the Federal Climate Protection Act partly unconstitutional because it did not sufficiently protect young people against future infringements and limitations of their existing fundamental rights because of climate change.

== Facts ==
Activists backed by Fridays For Future, Greenpeace, Friends of the Earth, and other NGOs brought a claim that the lack of a comprehensive legal framework to reduce carbon emissions by 2030 violated their fundamental rights as enshrined in German basic law. The complaint specifically called out that the state had to protect the right to life, personal freedom, right to property, and human dignity.

Luisa Neubauer and others brought a constitutional complaint against the Federal Climate Change Act, that the Germany government was not acting quickly enough to comply with constitutional rights in the Grundgesetz 1949, including the right to life and the duty to protect the environment.

== Judgment ==
The Constitutional Court declared in its ruling on 24 March 2021 part of the Federal Climate Protection Act unconstitutional, as it did not "sufficiently protect people against future infringements and limitations of freedom rights in the wake of gradually intensifying climate change". It ruled against some of their claims, saying the plaintiffs could not prove the government violated its constitutional duty.

The finance minister responded to the ruling by saying that he would work with the environment ministry to amend the act. The environmental minister wrote that she would present new climate proposals over the summer.

The German Constitutional Court held that the government had a duty to speed up its climate protection measures, as part of its constitutional duty to protect the rights to life and the environment under, respectively, article 2 and article 20a of the Grundgesetz 1949. It held that the causal link between manmade emissions and climate change, that all release of CO_{2} caused more warming, and that any carbon budget was limited. It rejected that because Germany could not stop global warming alone, it did not have responsibility: on the contrary it was necessary that Germany undertook action to encourage others to do so and international cooperation.

The German Constitutional Court said that the state cannot delay mitigation action if this would have the predictable effect of aggrieving future generations. The court also held that there is an obligation on the state to revisit the inter-temporal distribution effects of its climate laws and to equitably distribute allowable emissions over time and generations. This required the legislature to change existing climate laws by setting out clear provisions for reducing greenhouse gas emissions from 2031 onward by the end of 2022.

The Court said the following.

119. There is a direct causal link between anthropogenic climate change and concentrations of human-induced greenhouse gases in the Earth’s atmosphere (...). CO_{2} emissions are particularly significant in this regard. Once they have entered the Earth’s atmosphere, they are virtually impossible to remove as things currently stand. This means that anthropogenic global warming and climate change resulting from earlier periods cannot be reversed at some later date. At the same time, with every amount of CO_{2} emitted over and above a small climate-neutral quantity, the Earth’s temperature rises further along its irreversible trajectory and climate change also undergoes an irreversible progression. If global warming is to be halted at a specific temperature limit, nothing more than the amount of CO_{2} corresponding to this limit may be emitted. The world has a so-called remaining CO_{2} budget. If emissions go beyond this remaining budget, the temperature limit will be exceeded.

...

202. Either way, the obligation to take national climate action cannot be invalidated by arguing that such action would be incapable of stopping climate change. It is true that Germany would not be capable of preventing climate change on its own. Its isolated activity is clearly not the only causal factor determining the progression of climate change and the effectiveness of climate action. Climate change can only be stopped if climate neutrality is achieved worldwide. In view of the global reduction requirements, Germany’s 2% share of worldwide CO_{2} emissions (...) is only a small factor, but if Germany’s climate action measures are embedded within global efforts, they are capable of playing a part in the overall drive to bring climate change to a halt....

203. The state may not evade its responsibility here by pointing to GHG emissions in other states. (...) On the contrary, the particular reliance on the international community gives rise to a constitutional necessity to actually implement one’s own climate action measures at the national level – in international agreement wherever possible. It is precisely because the state is dependent on international cooperation in order to effectively carry out its obligation to take climate action under Art. 20a GG that it must avoid creating incentives for other states to undermine this cooperation. Its own activities should serve to strengthen international confidence in the fact that climate action – particularly the pursuit of treaty-based climate targets – can be successful while safeguarding decent living conditions, including in terms of fundamental freedoms. In practice, resolving the global climate problem is thus largely dependent on the existence of mutual trust that others will also strive to achieve the targets.

== Significance ==
Scholars have stated that the German Federal Court's judgment in this case possibly sets an innovative precedent. It shows how courts could embrace a holistic planetary view of climate science and impacts, planetary justice and stewardship, earth system vulnerability and global climate law to guide their reasoning and findings.

== See also ==
- Climate change litigation – Use of legal practice to further climate change mitigation
- EU law
