= Disability and climate change =

Disability symbols

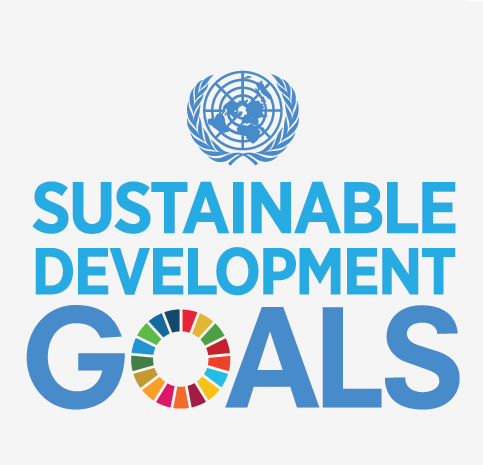
UN SDG logo

The United Nations Framework Convention on Climate Change (UNFCCC), the Paris Agreement, the Sustainable Development Goals (SDGs), and the United Nations Convention on the Rights of Persons with Disabilities (CRPD) are connected through their common goals of addressing global challenges and promoting sustainable development through policies and international cooperation.

This article focuses on climate change and the impact on persons with disabilities.

== Summary ==
The UNFCCC is an international treaty that was adopted in 1992 with the goal of addressing climate change and its impacts. It provides a framework for negotiating and implementing agreements to reduce greenhouse gas emissions and adapt to the changing climate.

The Paris Agreement, adopted in 2015, is a landmark international treaty that builds upon the framework established by the UNFCCC. Its main goal is to limit global warming to well below 2 degrees Celsius above pre-industrial levels, with efforts to limit the increase to 1.5 degrees Celsius. The agreement emphasizes the importance of sustainable development and includes provisions for financing and technology transfer to support developing countries in their climate actions.

The SDGs are a set of 17 global goals adopted by all United Nations Member States in 2015 as part of the 2030 Agenda for Sustainable Development. The goals cover a wide range of sustainable development issues, including poverty, hunger, health, education, gender equality, clean water, and climate action (SDG 13). The Paris Agreement is closely aligned with SDG 13, emphasizing the need for urgent action to combat climate change.

The UN CRPD is an international treaty that focuses on protecting the rights and dignity of persons with disabilities. It is connected to the broader concept of sustainable development by promoting inclusivity, accessibility, and equal participation in all aspects of society. Disability is included in five SDGs:

- SDG 4: Quality education – Ensure inclusive and equitable quality education and promote lifelong learning opportunities for all.
- SDG 8: Decent work and economic growth – Promote sustained, inclusive and sustainable economic growth, full and productive employment and decent work for all.
- SDG 10: Reduce inequality within and among countries.
- SDG 11: Sustainable cities and communities – Make cities and human settlements inclusive, safe, resilient and sustainable.
- SDG 17: Partnership for the goals – Strengthen the means of implementation and revitalize the Global Partnership for Sustainable Development, with emphasis on data collection, in particular disability disaggregated data.

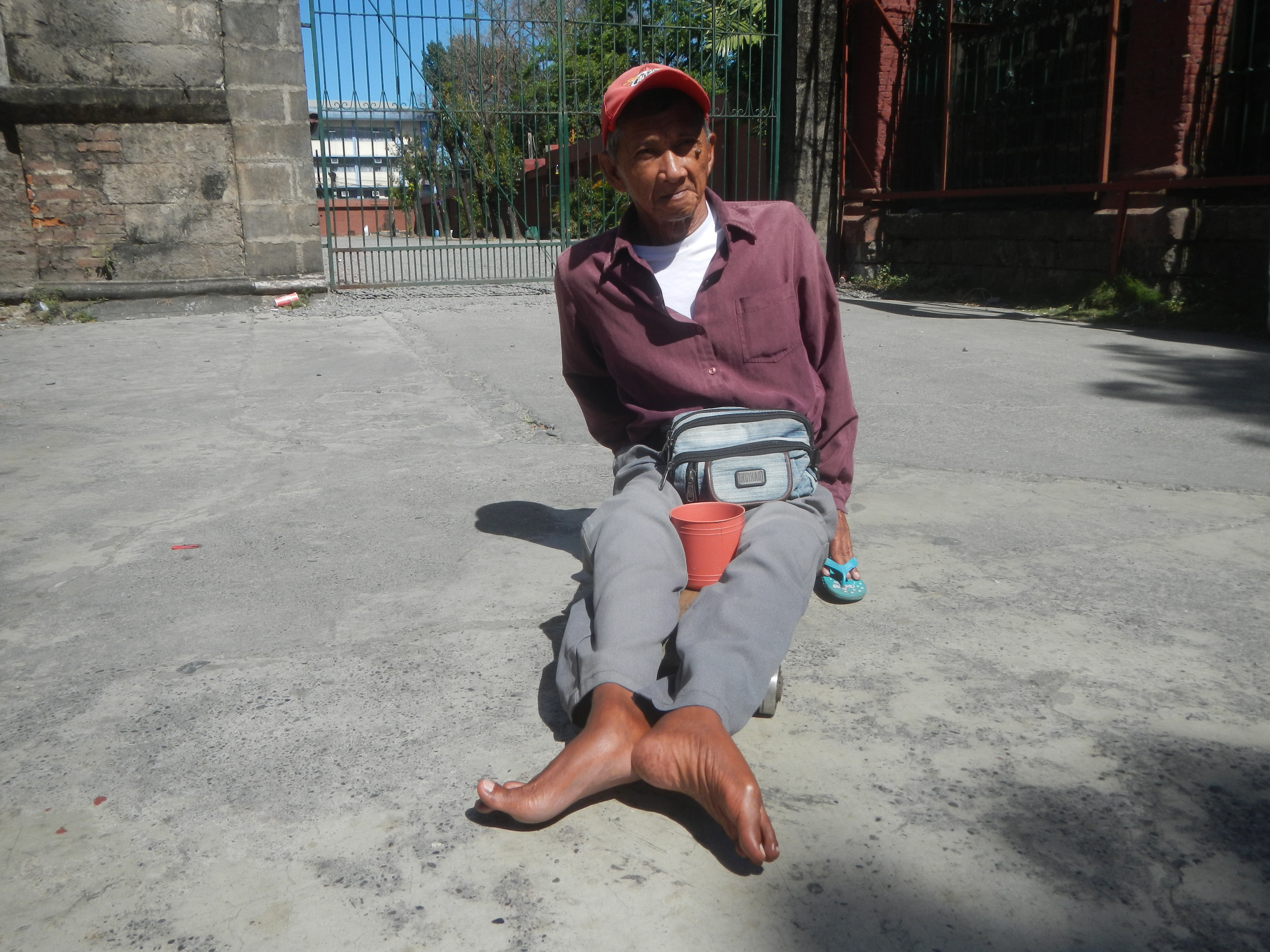
Disabled person from Bulacan

Climate change disproportionately affects individuals with disabilities, both directly and indirectly. Individuals with disabilities are more likely to experience the effects of climate change on humans more acutely compared to those without disabilities. Typically, disabled people are the most likely to be negatively affected by any form of emergency, whether it be an immediate emergency like a flood or tornado or a gradual emergency like rising sea levels, due to a lack of access to emergency resources and the difficulties imposed by limited mobility. Disabled people are also more adversely affected by climate change because a disproportionate number of disabled people live in poverty, and people living in poverty are inherently more at risk due to climate change. Despite this, and despite the fact that disabled people make up more than 15% of the global population, they have had minimal input and involvement in the decision-making process surrounding responses to climate change. A 2022 study by the Disability-Inclusive Climate Action Research Programme revealed that only 37 of 192 State Parties to the Paris Agreement currently refer to persons with disabilities in their nationally determined contributions, while only 46 State Parties refer to persons with disabilities in their domestic climate adaptation policies.

== Risks ==
The increased risks of disabled people with respect to climate change have not been widely acknowledged. For example, the Millennium Development Goals did not reference the relationship between disability and climate change. However, several international agreements and documents do elaborate on the relationship, such as the 2010 Cancun Agreements, the 2013 Warsaw International Mechanism for Loss and Damage, and the preamble to the 2015 Paris Agreement on Climate Change. Another step taken to ensure that information about climate risks by the Office of the High Commissioner for Human Rights (OHCHR) that publishes its new report highlighting the cases and further updates.

In 2019, the OHCHR published an analytical study on the promotion and protection of the rights of persons with disabilities in the context of climate change.

Meaningful participation, inclusion and leadership of people with disabilities and their representative organizations within disaster risk management and climate-related decision-making strategy within a local, national, regional and global levels, is a human right approach to address their rights and needs.

== Impacts ==
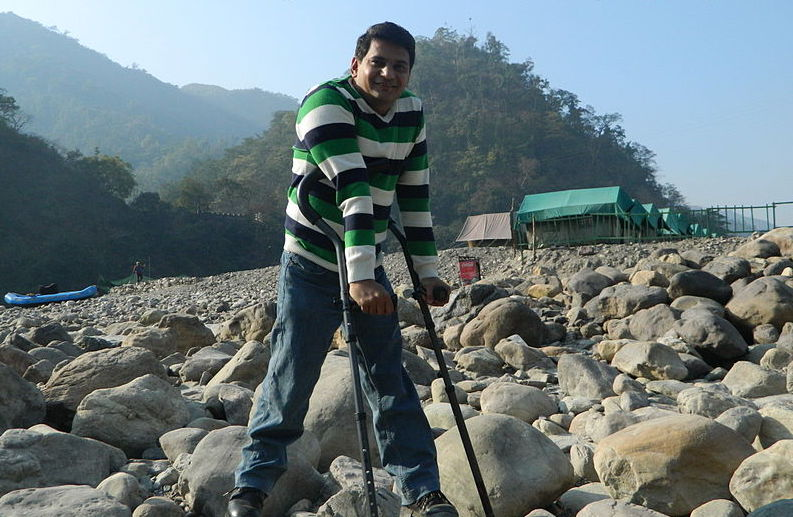
Person with disability crossing river Ganges

People with disabilities represent wide and diverse communities. However, on the whole, persons with disabilities are more vulnerable to climate change than persons without disabilities. Other factors, such as poverty, gender, or Indigeneity, can also compound an individual's vulnerability to climate change. For instance, individuals with certain pre-existing conditions or chronic illnesses may be more vulnerable to the effects of climate change, such as warmer temperatures and decreased air quality. However, a disproportionate number of persons with disabilities live in poverty, meaning that they may be unable to access crucial tools, like air conditioning, necessary to adapt to warmer temperatures and extreme heat events. The combined effects of economic inequality and an individual's health conditions can thus render them especially vulnerable to climate change.

The UN flagship report on disability and development reveals that disabled youth face additional challenges that are related to their basic rights to higher education, as is the case in less developed countries where education for regular people is lacking.

In 2018, the United Nations created a flagship report that has never been done before. The report was based on and talked about "disability and sustainable development goals". The report mentions how people with disabilities are at a disadvantage when it comes to climate change and the issues that come with it. The report states that the world needs to create action in order to remove the disadvantages that people with disabilities have. The report recommends actions that should be taken in order to do so.

The report had actual outcomes. In 2019, Member states adopted two resolutions that were in the general assembly. "The first resolution titled "Promoting social integration through social inclusion" (A/C.3/74/L.17/Rev.1) and the second titled "Implementation of the Convention on the Rights of Persons with Disabilities and the Optional Protocol thereto: accessibility" (A/C.3/74/L.32/Rev.1)" (UN.org).

== Disadvantages ==
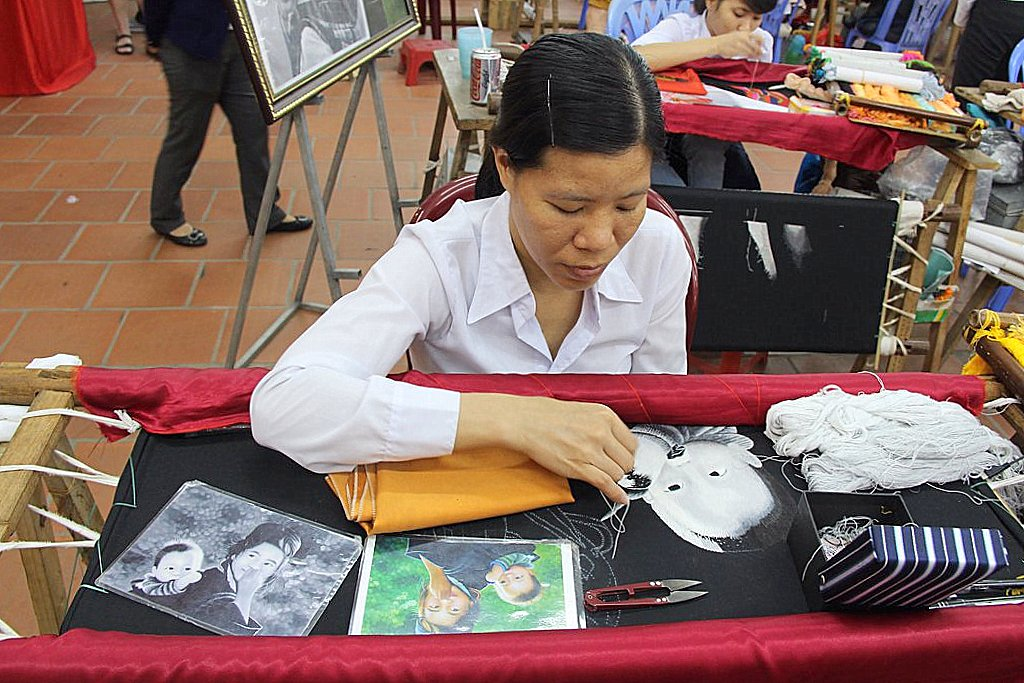
Working woman on a company for people with disabilities in Viet nam a project type

Climate change poses multiple disadvantages to persons with disabilities.

=== Poverty ===
Disabled people are disproportionately represented in the poorest communities, and a large percent live below the poverty line. As such, disabled people are more likely to be affected by the same challenges faced by impoverished communities. People with disabilities experience poverty at more than twice the rate of non-disabled people. As the climate changes, crop failure and drought will become more common, leaving poorer communities without food security. Water shortages are more acutely felt by poor neighborhoods, a problem which will only become more clear as climate change worsens. As job opportunities are lost due to the impacts of environmental disasters, disabled people are likely to be the first to lose employment or agricultural land.

=== Health ===
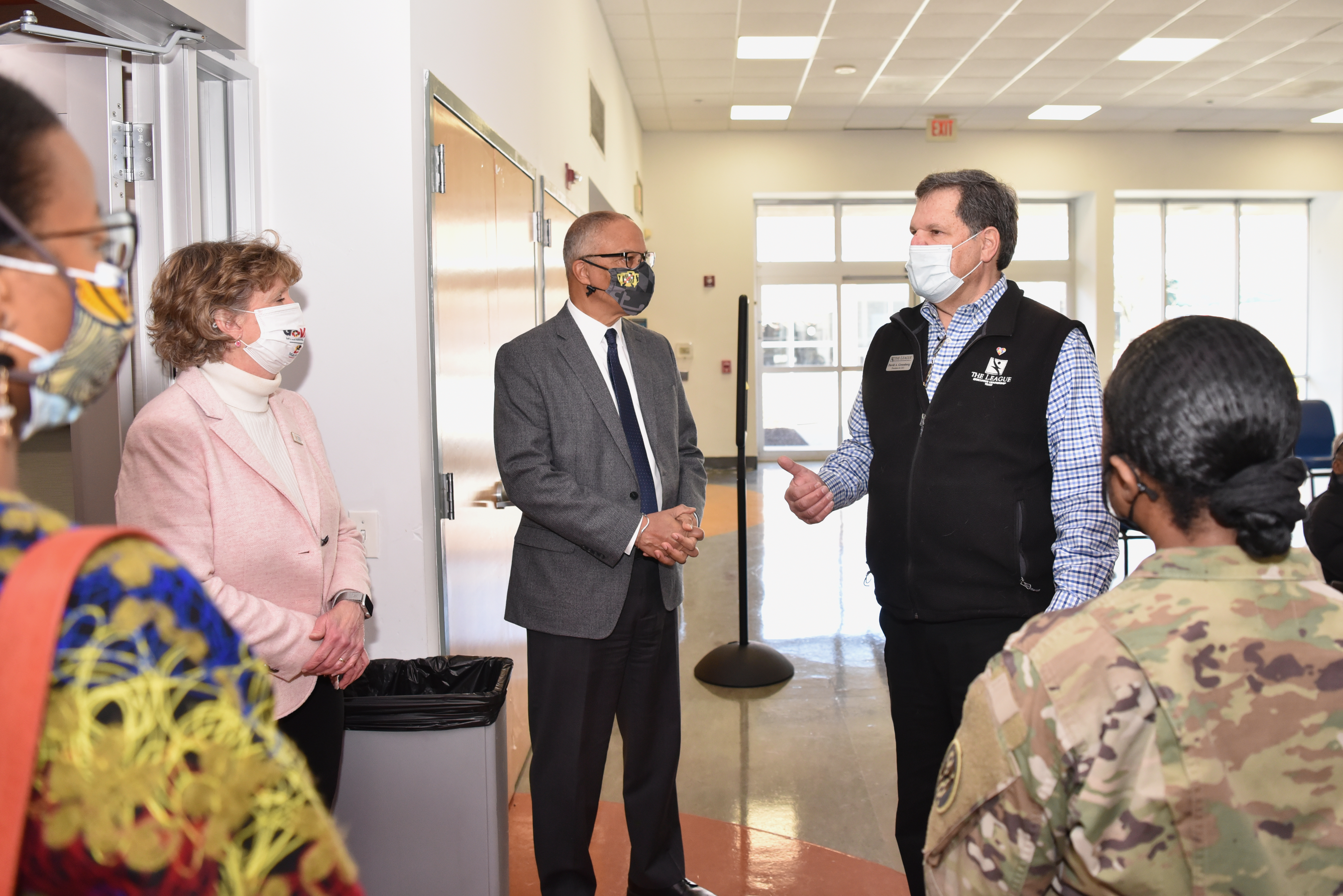
Lt. Governor Rutherford Tours the League for People with Disabilities' Vaccination Site

Climate change results in more health care inequalities faced by persons with disabilities.

Even without the impacts of climate change, disabled people have less equal access to health care than those without disabilities because of social stigmas, exclusion, poverty, discriminatory policies, and a lack of health care programs for specific disabilities. When stressors related to climate change reduce the effectiveness of health care systems, these inequalities in access to health care between disabled and non-disabled people widen. Disruptions to social services and other essential services can be especially detrimental, as disabled people often rely on regular and reliable access to these services.

During climate change induced disasters, another challenge disabled people may face is the loss of adaptive equipment that help them have increased mobility or ability to interface via sight or sound.Many people with disabilities depend on assistive devices that improve their physical functions and mobility. Once they are threatened by a disaster, assistive devices are out of reach because they are either lost or damaged. This would leave these people without adaptive support to survive. These could include wheelchairs, hearing aids, and the like. During a disaster, these devices are likely to be lost or destroyed. Additionally, when relief is provided to areas affected by natural disasters, these types of items are rarely provided, leaving disabled people to go without them for extended periods of time. Increased temperatures pose greater risks to disabled people, as many disabilities impact one's ability to regulate body temperatures. Climate change also poses specific risks to those with respiratory disabilities because the warming climate can increase triggers such as ground level ozone and pollen.

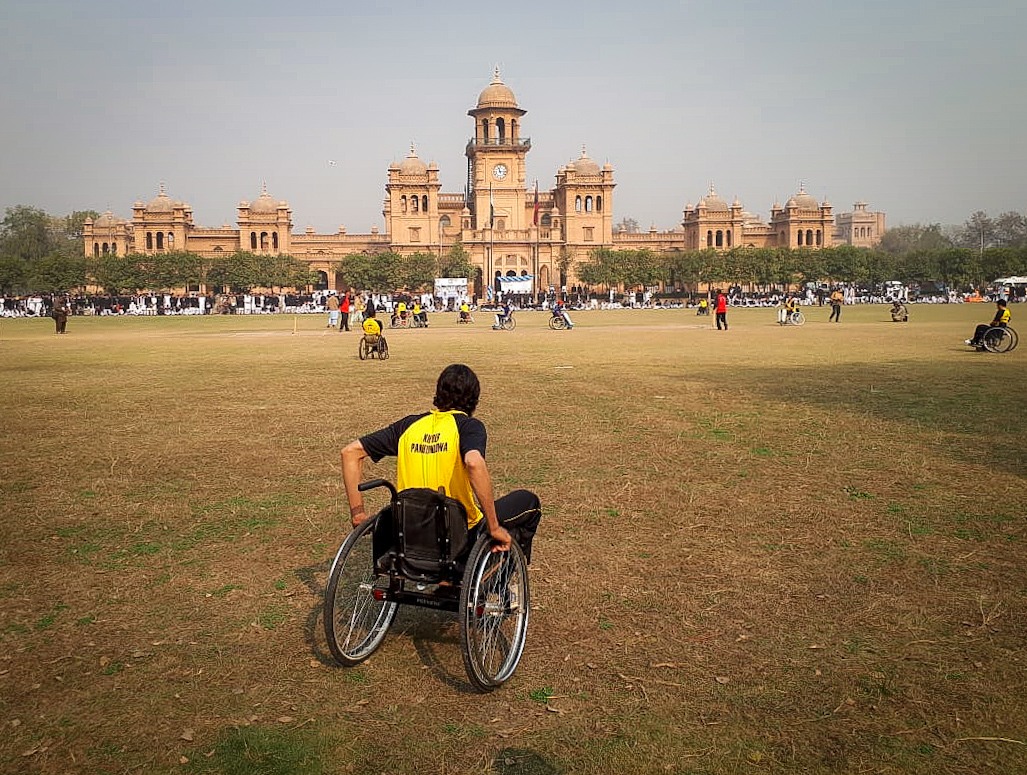
Persons with Disabilities Day

=== Mobility ===
While disabled people are frequently less physically mobile, they also experience other mobility-related disadvantages. Disabled people often have more difficulty travelling internationally, despite technically having the right to international mobility. This typically occurs because countries will deny disabled migrants entry because of the perceived burden they are believed to place on the country.

In the greater picture of climate change motivated migration, international migration plays a relatively minor role, with internal migration making up the bulk of movement. Unfortunately, there has been minimal research on the involvement in internal migration by disabled people, and the effects that this form of migration have on disabled people's adaptive capabilities are largely unknown.

== Vulnerability and Capacity ==
It is paramount to recognize vulnerability and the capacity for adaption.

An emergency within the context of climate change puts people with disabilities with an increased risk because of their vulnerability. A guidance note created by the World Health Organization regarding disability and emergency risk management describes a number of extra challenges faced by people with disabilities in an emergency period.

Critical factors shape the resilience and adaptive ability of individuals within their communities. Such factors are: access to and control over natural, human, social, physical, and financial resources. People with disabilities have various types of vulnerabilities: poor education, lack of income, social exclusion and limited access to decision-making authorities.

== Global frameworks ==
There are a number of frameworks and policies that highlight the governments use of a human rights-based approach when developing and implementing climate policies and programs to ensure equity.

Disabilities-health-climate-change

=== The United Nations Convention on the Rights of Persons with Disabilities ===
The United Nations Convention on the Rights of Persons with Disabilities (UN CRPD) and its Optional Protocol (A/RES/61/106) was adopted on 13 December 2006 at the United Nations Headquarters in New York, and was opened for signature on 30 March 2007. It had 82 signatories to the convention, 44 signatories to the Optional Protocol, and 1 ratification of the convention. It is the first comprehensive human rights treaty of the 21st century and is the first human rights convention to be open for signature by regional integration organizations.

Under the UNCRPD, States have a number of obligations that are relevant in the context of climate change. The UNCRPD specifically requires that State Parties "take into account the protection and promotion of the human rights of persons with disabilities in all policies and programs". This can be understood, as argued by Jodoin, Ananthamoorthy, and Lofts, as requiring States to design climate policies and measures in a way that considers the rights of persons with disabilities and ensures that the policies themselves do not violate their rights. Moreover, this requirement could be understood as requiring States to reduce carbon emissions in order to avoid their negative human rights impacts on persons with disabilities. The UNCRPD also requires that States ensure the participation of persons with disabilities in the development and implementation of policies; accordingly, States should include persons with disabilities, through consultation or other processes, in the creation and implementation of climate policies.

=== The United Nations Disability Inclusion Strategy (UNDIS) ===
The UN Partnership on the Rights of Persons with Disabilities, a system wide partnership that UNDP hosts the technical secretariat with 5 other UN entities, can support UNCTs' joint UN work on disability inclusion. The UNDIS acts as a benchmark towards achieving transformative change for people with disability. It consists of a policy and an accountability framework.

UN Secretary-General António Guterres launched the UNDIS to bring disability inclusion to the forefront of all areas of the UN's work around the world. The United Nations Disability Inclusion Strategy provides the foundation for sustainable and transformative progress on disability inclusion through all pillars of the work of the United Nations: peace and security, human rights, and development. The Strategy enables the UN system to support the implementation of the Convention on the Rights of Persons with Disabilities and other international human rights instruments, as well as the achievement of the Sustainable Development Goals, the Agenda for Humanity and the Sendai Framework for Disaster Risk Reduction. The Strategy enables the UN system to support the implementation of the Convention on the Rights of Persons with Disabilities and other international human rights instruments, as well as the achievement of the Sustainable Development Goals, the Agenda for Humanity and the Sendai Framework for Disaster Risk Reduction.

=== IASC Guidelines on Inclusive Humanitarian Action ===
Inclusion is achieved when people with disabilities meaningfully participate and when disability-related concerns are addressed in compliance with the Convention on the Rights of Persons with Disabilities. IASC Guidelines sets out the essential actions that humanitarian actors must take in order to effectively identify and respond to the needs and rights of persons with disabilities.

== See also ==
- Assistive technology
- Climate change and cities
- Disability and disasters
- Disability rights movement
