= Impact of the COVID-19 pandemic on people with disabilities =

Individuals with disabilities are more susceptible to contracting COVID-19 and have higher mortality rates compared to those without disabilities. This is particularly true for people with intellectual and developmental disabilities, those residing in care facilities, and women with disabilities. Individuals with disabilities face heightened risks of mental health issues related to the pandemic, such as increased feelings of loneliness and isolation. They were also more likely to face domestic violence and abuse during the pandemic. People with disabilities are more likely to experience unemployment as a result of the pandemic and may require changes to the types of accommodations they require for work. Children with disabilities experience complications in their educational programming. Remote learning poses a host of challenges for children with disabilities, including disruptions to physical and occupational therapies and access to assistive technologies.

== Risk of disease ==
According to United Nations (UN) estimates, roughly 46% of individuals aged 60 or older have a disability worldwide, and about 80% of the world's disabled population lives in developing countries, where access to health care is more limited. Globally, it is estimated that between 19% and 72% of COVID-related deaths have taken place in care facilities, an environment in which persons with disabilities are overrepresented. Some adults with intellectual and developmental disabilities may require additional support to follow public-health measures. In a small study of five adults, synchronous reinforcement increased mask wearing for up to 30 minutes, with some participants also wearing masks in different community settings.

Facing resource shortages and overwhelmed health systems, several entities, such as the World Health Organization (WHO), the UN, and UNICEF, have expressed concern over disabled people's access to medical treatment for COVID-related disease and illness. Several disability rights entities have expressed concern over medical rationing during the pandemic and have argued that such measures are ableist and discriminatory toward individuals with disabilities. The vast majority of health care providers in the United States cannot use disability as grounds to ration care, as outlined both in the Americans with Disabilities Act and the Affordable Care Act. In response to these concerns, the US Office for Civil Rights issued a bulletin at the end of March 2020 asserting that medical rationing measures cannot discriminate against people with disabilities and other protected groups.

Based on figures issued by the Office for National Statistics, from March through May 2020, disabled people constituted roughly two-thirds of all COVID-related deaths in the United Kingdom. The report also concluded that disabled women were 11 times more likely than their non-disabled counterparts to die of complications from COVID and that disabled men were 6.5 times more likely to die of COVID-related illness than their non-disabled counterparts. People with intellectual and developmental disabilities are at particularly high risk of contracting and dying from COVID. According to initial data from the United States, people with intellectual disabilities are four times more likely to contract COVID and twice as likely to die from the disease.

== Impact ==
=== Social ===
Previous research on pandemics has indicated that people with disabilities are more vulnerable to a host of social and psychological issues. They are more likely to experience loneliness and isolation, which may lead to other poor health outcomes. Women with disabilities and women who care for individuals with disabilities are at greater risk for domestic abuse and sexual violence during pandemics. They may also be unable to access reproductive care and may be more likely to experience socioeconomic disadvantages associated with the pandemic.

Children with disabilities are also at higher risk for mental distress as a result of the pandemic and may also be at greater risk of experiencing domestic violence during the COVID crisis. As of 2016, there were roughly 52 million children, age 5 and younger, with some form of developmental disability, and about 1 in 6 children in the United States, between the ages of 3 and 12, has a developmental disability. Children with intellectual and developmental disabilities, especially those with autism spectrum disorder, may be more likely to experience anxiety, stress, and other ill effects resulting from the pandemic. They may be particularly sensitive to changes in their daily routines, such as school closures. Children with disabilities are at higher risk of contracting COVID-19 and developing serious complications from the disease. They may not be able to adequately socially distance themselves while interacting with others, or they may not be able to wear masks due to sensory issues. This may lead to further isolation for disabled children and their families.

The rise of virtual gatherings has allowed some people with disabilities to participate in activities that were previously difficult to attend. For example, individuals with certain physical disabilities do not need to worry about whether a location is wheelchair-accessible when the event is conducted fully online.

=== Employment ===
In the United States, according to the Equal Employment Opportunity Commission, employers must follow guidelines set out by the Americans with Disabilities Act (ADA) with consideration for COVID-19. This means that employers must keep all medical information they gather from employees related to COVID prevention confidential. They must continue to offer individuals with disabilities reasonable accommodations as well as take into consideration the accommodation requests made by individuals at higher risk for contracting more serious cases of COVID-19, such as those who are 65 years of age or older and those with pre-existing conditions. Employers may have to re-negotiate reasonable accommodations for individuals with disabilities based on the changes to work environments brought about by the pandemic, such as the prevalence of remote work. In some respects, the expansion of "work from home" arrangements in many businesses has actually improved employment opportunities for disabled people.

According to the UN, individuals with disabilities are more likely to lose their jobs as a result of the pandemic and face more difficulty returning to work during the recovery period. Individuals with long-term effects of COVID, such as chronic fatigue, may also face employment challenges.

Visually impaired youth sharing his trauma about losing his job due to the COVID-19 pandemic because of an outstation issue—interviewed in Kolkata, West Bengal, India, September 2021

=== Education ===
As of April 2020, schools had ceased in-person operations in 189 countries, affecting roughly 1.5 billion children worldwide. Children with disabilities have faced a host of challenges related to remote learning. They have faced disruptions to the services they require as laid out in their Individualized Education Programs (IEP) and have struggled with many of the technologies used to carry out remote learning. Many types of assistive technologies, such as screen readers for the blind, are not compatible with the software platforms being used for remote learning. Children with disabilities often require in-person assistance, such as various physical and occupational therapies, and most teachers are not trained in how to conduct education remotely for children with disabilities. Parents of disabled children are also struggling, as they are being asked to provide many of the services their children receive in school without the training or expertise to do so. Parents of children with disabilities are also concerned about the risks involved in their children returning to school. Children with disabilities are more likely to have other health conditions that increase their risk of COVID-related complications.

== Vaccine access ==
For disabled individuals, COVID-19 vaccine distributions have raised some concerns. In many Western countries, such as the U.S., Canada, Australia, and across Europe, vaccine rollouts have been uneven, exposing and exacerbating many of the inequities disabled individuals face. Despite disabled people being overall more willing to be vaccinated than those without disabilities, they have received vaccines at lower rates. This vaccination-rate discrepancy likely grew from non-standardized vaccine rollouts; in the United States, for example, each state was allowed to differently implement the vaccine guidelines put forth by the Centers for Disease Control and Prevention (CDC). Similarly, in Europe and Canada, there were no specific guidelines in place that provided accommodations to disabled individuals. This lack of standardization and accommodation left many disabled individuals behind, unable to get the vaccine regardless of desire.

A recent investigation into vaccine access in the United States conducted by the CDC cites access difficulties as one of the main reasons why disabled individuals are vaccinated at lower rates than the rest of the population. For example, many disabled individuals cite having trouble either getting to a vaccination location or making online appointments as one of the reasons why they have not yet been vaccinated. To overcome these obstacles, the CDC has issued a set of guidelines with regard to vaccine distribution to disabled individuals. These guidelines outline changes that vaccine locations should make, such as making instruction and information available in both American Sign Language (ASL) and in braille. Europe has also established similar guidelines.

== See also ==
- Disability and disasters
