= Human rights and climate change =

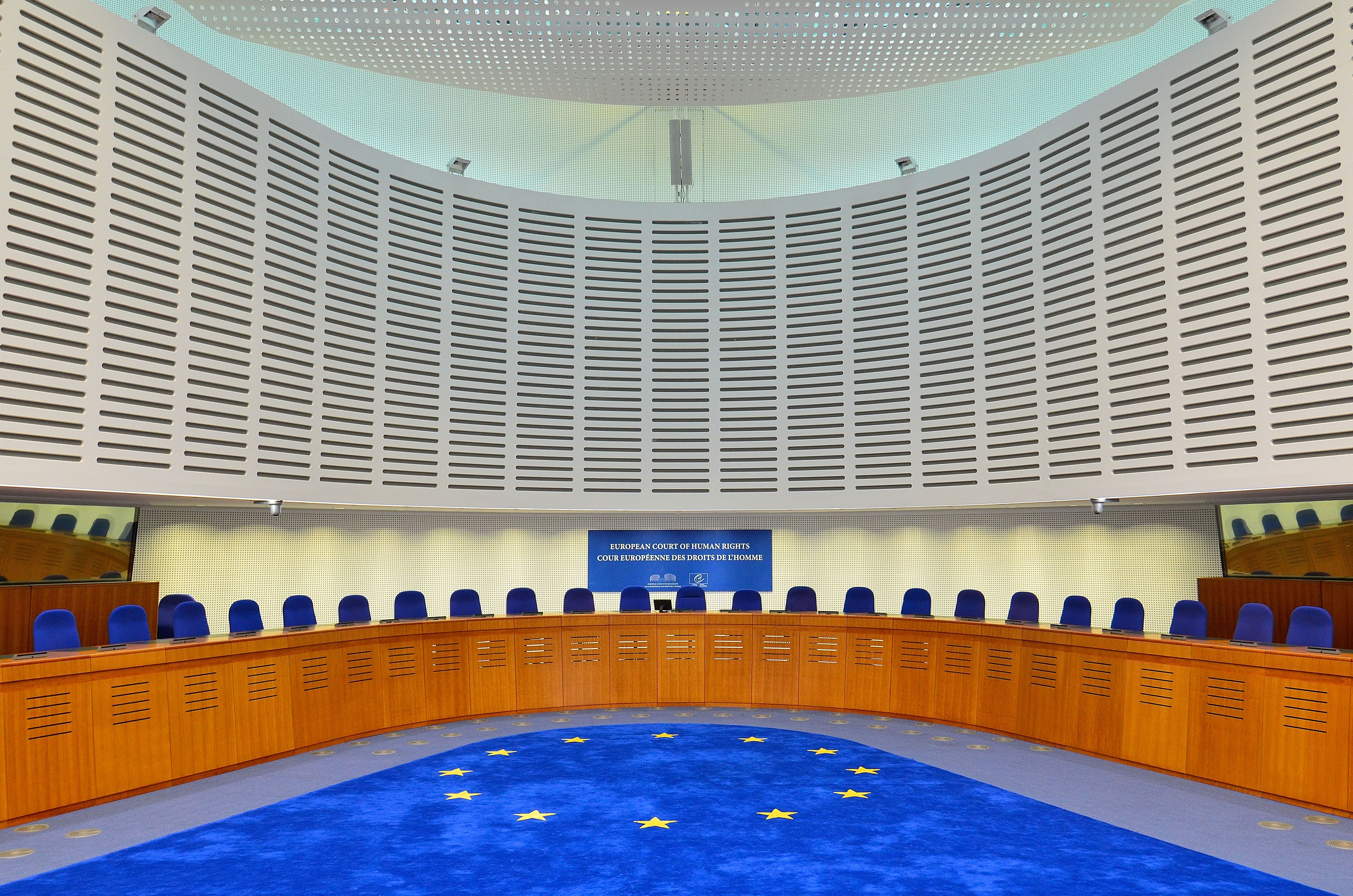
On 9 April 2024, the European Court of Human Rights ruled that human rights encompasses a right to effective protection by the State authorities from the serious adverse effects of climate change on lives, health and well-being.

Human rights and climate change is a conceptual and legal framework under which international human rights and their relationship to global warming are studied, analyzed, and addressed. The framework has been employed by governments, United Nations organizations, intergovernmental and non-governmental organizations, human rights and environmental advocates, and academics to guide national and international policy on climate change under the United Nations Framework Convention on Climate Change (UNFCCC) and the core international human rights instruments. In 2022 Working Group II of the IPCC suggested that "climate justice comprises justice that links development and human rights to achieve a rights-based approach to addressing climate change".

Human rights and climate change analysis focuses on the anticipated consequences to humans associated with global environmental phenomena including sea level rise, desertification, temperature increases, extreme weather events, and changes in precipitation, as well as adaptation and mitigation measures taken by governments in response to those phenomena that may involve human rights or related legal protections. Many legal approaches to climate change use the right to a healthy environment, other related rights or other emergent environmental law approaches, such as rights of nature, to advocate for new or required action by governments and private actors, through climate justice advocacy and climate litigation.

On 8 October 2021, the UN Human Rights Council passed a resolution that recognizes a human right to a safe, clean, healthy and sustainable environment – resolution 48/13.

== History ==
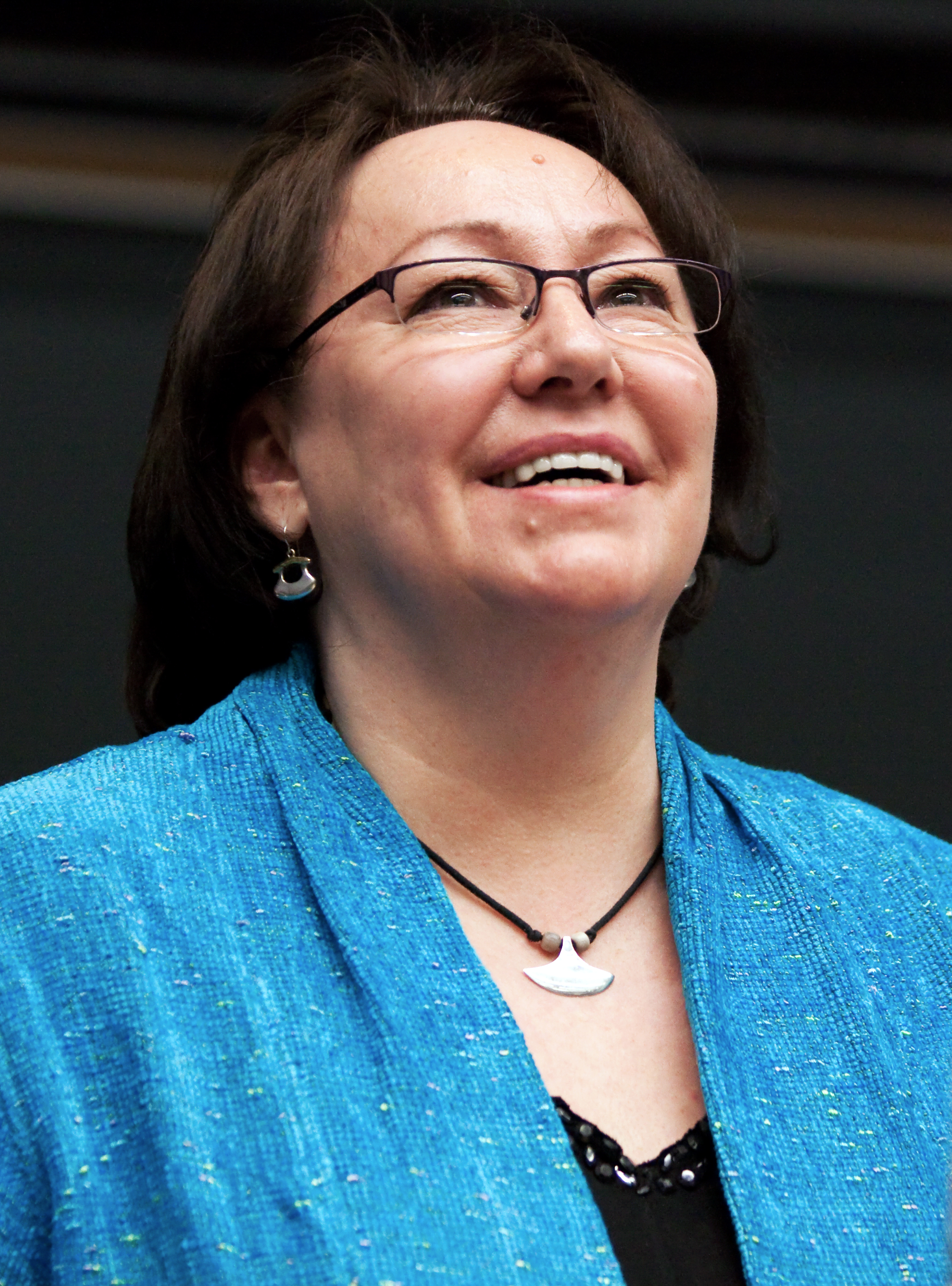
Inuit activist Sheila Watt-Cloutier filed a petition to the Inter-American Commission on Human Rights

In 2005, Inuit activist Sheila Watt-Cloutier filed a petition to the Inter-American Commission on Human Rights seeking relief "from human rights violations resulting from the impacts of global warming and climate change caused by acts and omissions of the United States." The petition was rejected, but the Commission invited and heard testimony on the relationship between human rights and climate change from representatives for the Inuit in 2007.

That same year, the Malé Declaration on the Human Dimension of Global Climate Change "stated explicitly (and for the first time in an international agreement) that 'climate change has clear and immediate implications for the full enjoyment of human rights' and called on the United Nations human rights system to address the issue as a matter of urgency."

The following year, the UN Human Rights Council (HRC) unanimously adopted Resolution 7/23, recognizing that "climate change poses an immediate and far-reaching threat to people and communities around the world and has implications for the full enjoyment of human rights," and citing the Charter of the United Nations, the Universal Declaration of Human Rights, the International Covenant on Economic, Social and Cultural Rights, and the International Covenant on Civil and Political Rights. The HRC reaffirmed and expanded these statements with resolutions 10/4 of 25 March 2009 and 18/22 of 30 September 2011.

In 2009, the Office of the United Nations High Commissioner for Human Rights (OHCHR) released an analytical study identifying specific rights and people groups likely to be adversely affected by climate disruptions. The report drew on the submissions of some 30 nations as well as ten United Nations Agencies and dozens of other organizations. The report identified displaced persons, conflict and security risks as well as impaired rights of indigenous peoples, women, and children as major concerns.

In 2010, the Conference of Parties to the UNFCCC reproduced the HRC's language identifying the relationship between human rights and climate change in its report on the 2010 United Nations Climate Change Conference in Cancun, Mexico. The report on the outcome of the Conference emphasized that "Parties should, in all climate change related actions, fully respect human rights."

Recent years have seen an increased recognition of the link between human rights and the environment, yet there are still many questions surrounding the relationship between them. As a result, in 2012 the HRC established a mandate on human rights obligations relating to the enjoyment of a safe, clean, healthy and sustainable environment. A preliminary report by the appointed Independent Expert, John H. Knox, further stated that there needed to be priority in providing greater conceptual clarity to the application of human rights obligations related to the environment.

In 2014, all 78 of the United Nations Special Procedures Mandate Holders issued a joint statement on Human Rights Day calling for states to incorporate their existing obligations under the human rights framework into climate change negotiations. This would have the effect of bringing the rights of those affected by climate change to the forefront of all response strategies.

As of March 2015, there is now a Special Rapporteur on human rights and the environment, an extension of the mandate of the former Independent Expert on human rights obligations relating to the enjoyment of a right to a safe, clean, healthy and sustainable environment. Leading up to the 2015 United Nations Climate Change Conference in Paris, the Special Rapporteur informed states that they should ensure their human rights obligations encompass the appropriate perspective towards climate change when negotiating future agreements.

The Paris Agreement, as adopted on the 12 December 2015 at the Conference of the Parties, is the most important indication of increasing awareness towards the relationship between climate change and human rights. The Paris Agreement is the first climate agreement to recognise the relevance of human rights, stating:

Parties should, when taking action to address climate change, respect, promote and consider their respective obligations on human rights, the right to health, the rights of indigenous peoples, local communities, migrants, children, persons with disabilities and people in vulnerable situations and the right to development, as well as gender equality, empowerment of women and intergenerational equity.

== Human rights law and climate change ==
Climate change is inducing not only ecological adjustments, but is also impacting the social, economic, political, cultural and legal aspects of societies around the world. The HRC has affirmed that human rights obligations have the ability to strengthen both international and national policy-making in the area of climate change. The 1972 Stockholm Declaration provided the basis for further elaboration of a human right to environmental quality.

Environmental protection is not commonly included in human rights treaties. Rather environmental protection is derived from the rights that those treaties protect, such as the rights to life, food, water and health. Moving forward, human rights law in the context of climate change policy-making may help to establish minimum standards of basic human rights that can be adopted in international and national mitigation and adaption measures. Climate apartheid are the conditions of world affairs, when solely the rich are able to escape the consequences of climate change. As according to Philip Alston, a UN expert, global warming will likely undermine democracy and the rule of law, in addition to basic human rights to life.

In 2021 at its 48th session, the Human Rights Council adopted Resolution 13: The human right to a clean, healthy and sustainable environment.

The Oslo Principles on Global Climate Change Obligations for states and enterprises are based, in part, on human rights law. Under the Oslo Principles, both states and enterprises have an obligation to ensure that global warming is limited to 2 degrees Celsius.

== Rights implicated ==
Most international statements on human rights and climate change have emphasized the potential adverse impacts of climate change on the rights to life, food, water, health, housing, development, and self-determination. These rights are enumerated in the core conventions of international human rights law, though not all HRC members or UNFCCC parties are signatories of these conventions.

=== Right to life ===
The right to life is protected by Article 6 of the ICCPR where every human being has the inherent right to life. The right to life is inextricably linked to the measure of fulfilment of other rights. There are both projected and observed effects that climate change will have on the right to life. The Intergovernmental Panel on Climate Change (IPCC) fourth assessment report projected an increase in people suffering from death and injury occurring from an increase in floods, storms, heatwaves, fires and droughts. Climate change will equally affect the right to life through an increase in hunger and malnutrition and related disorder impacting child growth and development, respiratory morbidity and ground-level ozone. Rising sea levels is one of the flow-on effects of climate change, resulting from warming water and melting ice sheets. Measuring sea level rise is a complicated affair, however the IPCC have projected an increase in global mean sea level of between 0.44m and 0.74m by 2100. For low-lying coastal islands such as Male', in the Maldives, a sea level rise of 0.5 metres would inundate 15 per cent of the island by 2025, and flood half of it by 2100. As 42 per cent of the population lives within 100m within the coastline, even partial flooding is likely to result in drowning, injury and loss of life.

Observed effects are those where the right to life has already inhibited the right to life. There is difficulty in studying the impacts of climate change itself because of the issue of scale; climate change is measured in decades. There is more than 95 per cent chance that anthropogenic climate change quadrupled the risk of extreme summer heat events in Europe in the decade 1998 to 2008. There is a probability of 75 per cent that the 2003 heat wave in Europe was attributable to climate change. On this basis, the excess mortality rate from this event registered at 15,000 deaths in France alone.

=== Right to food ===
This is derived from Article II of the ICESCR where States party to the Covenant have to maximise their available resources to achieve the right to adequate food. Climate change is going to affect all four pillars of food security; availability, access, utilization and stability. A 2008 report by the Special Rapporteur on the right to food has stated that the way the world grows food will have to undergo radical change to cope with a growing population and the effects of climate change, while avoiding environmental collapse. The Paris Agreement recognises the fundamental priority of ensuring food security and the particular vulnerabilities of food production systems to the adverse impacts of climate change. Article 2 calls for adaption to the adverse impacts of climate change and the lowering of greenhouse gas emissions in a manner that will not threaten food production. The IPCC fourth assessment report projects that food production will increase in the mid to high latitudes with a temperature increase of between 1° and 3 °C, however at lower latitudes crop productivity is set to decrease which increases the risk of food insecurity in poorer regions of the world. The United Nations Development Programme estimate an additional 600 million people will face malnutrition due to climate change. This is likely to have a particularly devastating effect on Sub-Saharan Africa.

=== Right to water ===
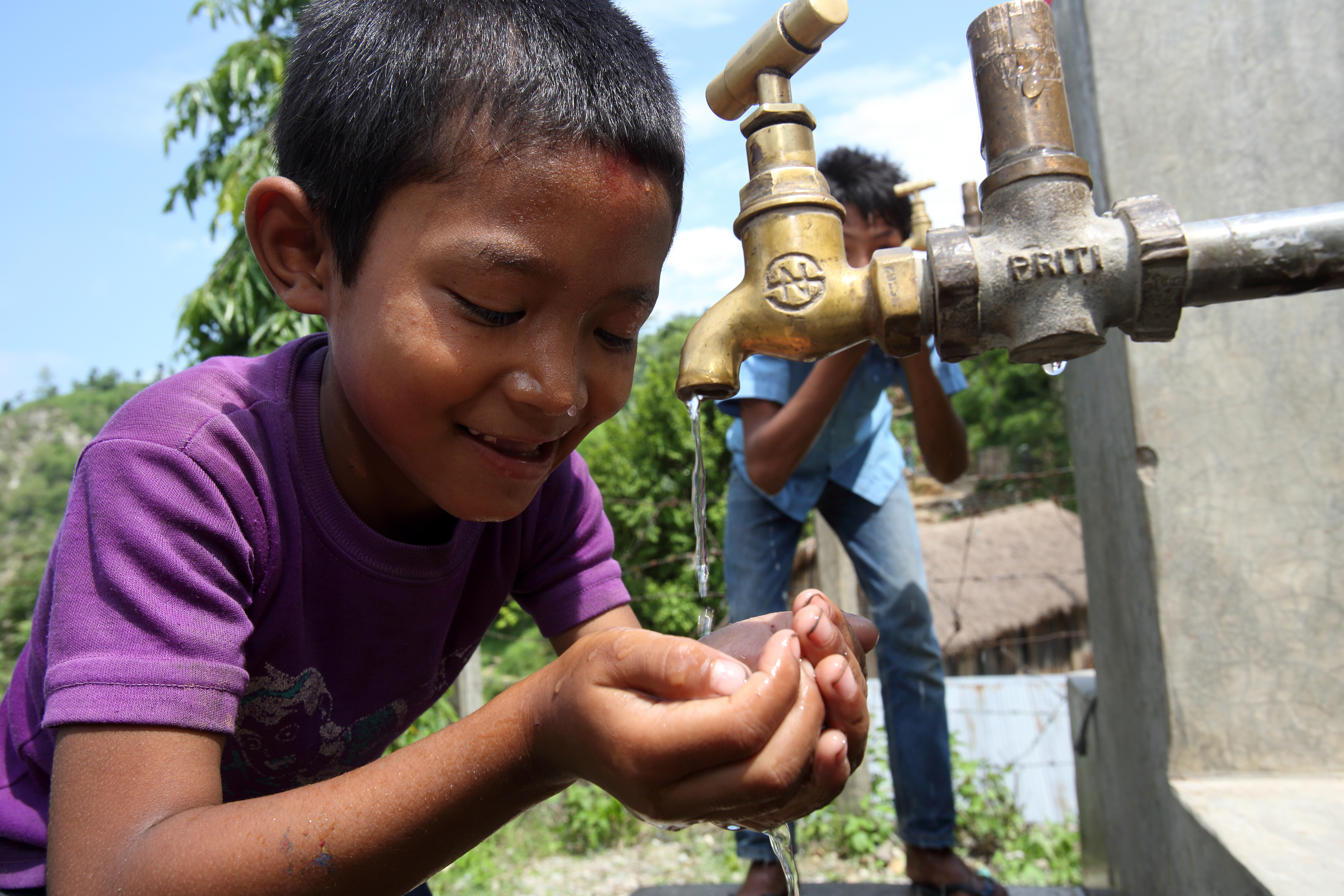
Boy drinks from a tap at a NEWAH WASH water project in Puware Shikhar, Udayapur District, Nepal.

The Committee on Economic, Social and Cultural Rights (CESCR) notes that the right to water is not only an essential condition to survival, but also that it is inextricably linked with other rights, such as; housing, attainable standard of health, adequate standard of living, and right to food. The Stern Review states that people will feel the effects of climate change the most strongly through changes in patterns of water distribution around the globe. Those areas that are already experiencing dry conditions will experience a further decrease in water availability, with several (but not all) climate models predicting up to a 30 per cent decrease in annual run-off in the Mediterranean Basin, parts of southern Africa and South America for a 2 °C global temperature rise, and 40 – 50 per cent for 4 °C rise. The IPCC fifth assessment report states that freshwater-related risks increase significantly with increasing greenhouse gas concentrations, with climate change over the 21st century projected to reduce renewable surface water and groundwater resources significantly in most dry subtropical regions.

=== Right to health ===
Article 12 of the ICESCR identifies the "right to the highest attainable standard of physical and mental health". Most national constitutions protect the right to health in some manner, and it is widely safeguarded in other international and regional instruments. Climate change is going to amplify health disparities between the rich and poor in different parts of the world. The World Health Organisation (WHO) estimates that since 1970, climate change is responsible for 150,000 deaths every year through increasing incidence in the spread of diarrhoea, malaria and malnutrition predominantly in Africa and other developing regions. Just a 1 °C increase in global temperature from pre-industrial levels could double the annual deaths from climate change (according to WHO).

=== Right to a safe, clean, healthy and sustainable environment ===
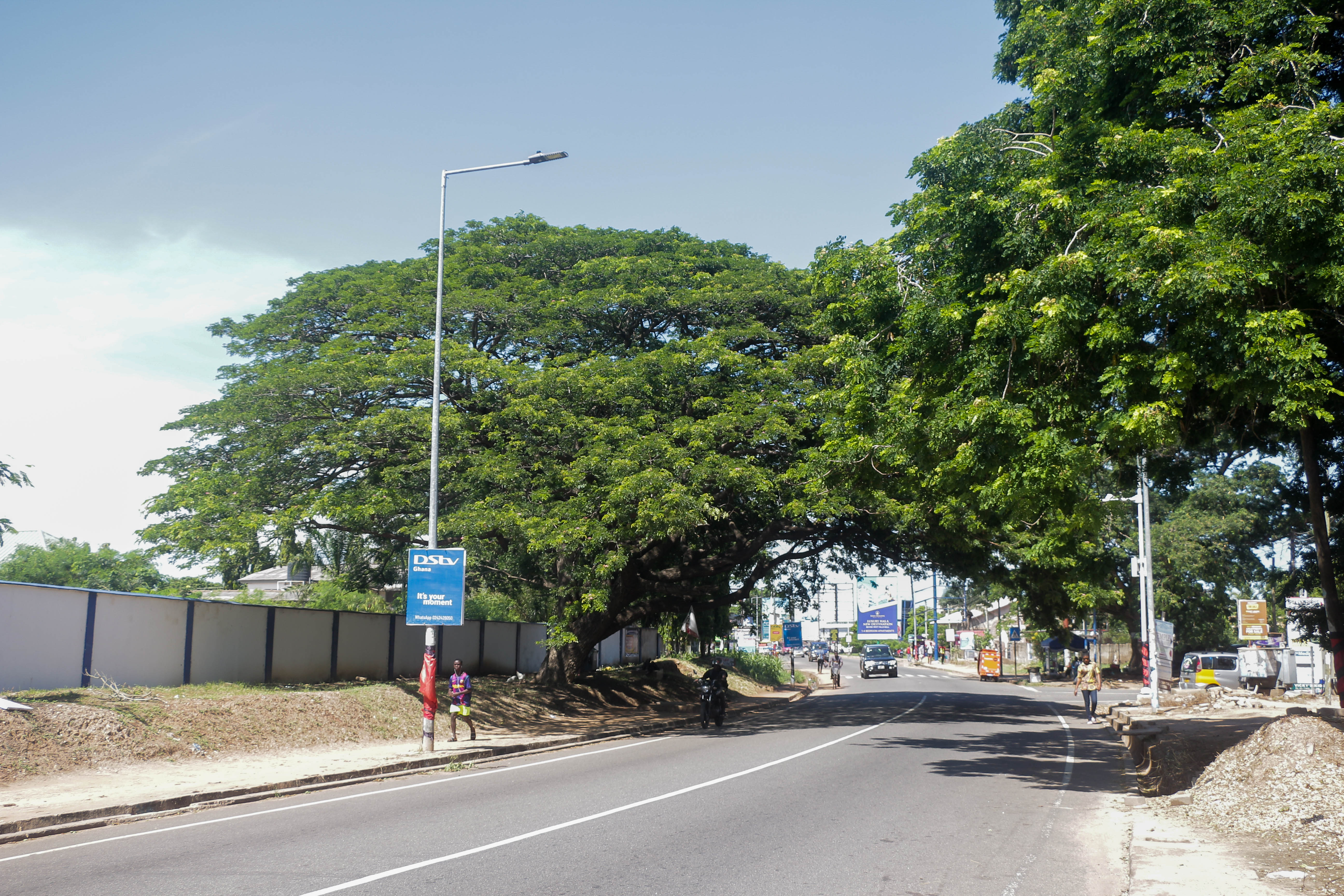
This trees provide a serene of beauty and oxygen on our environment

On 8 October 2021, the UN Human Rights Council passed a resolution that recognizes a human right to a safe, clean, healthy and sustainable environment – resolution 48/13.

== Specific issues ==
=== Displacement ===
Potential climate induced migration is currently one of the most disputed flow-on effects from climate change. Research suggests that climate change may create some 50 to 200 million new internally displaced persons and international refugees by the year 2100. "Mega-deltas" in Asia, Africa, and small islands are at high risk of floods and storms, which will cause large-scale displacement of the local populations. Climate change induced migration will either affect or violate basic international human right norms.

=== Climate justice ===
There is significant discussion around the concept of climate justice for the environmental migrant or 'climate refugee'. This concept aims to fill a gap in the legal and political sectors for the millions of people that are not able to receive international legal protection as this source of migration is yet to be included in regional and international law. There is currently no established definition for who can be classified as a climate refugee because it has not yet been enshrined in international law. In 2014 Siego Alesana left the small island developing state of Tuvalu because of the uncertainty surrounding the adverse effects of climate change. Tuvalu is only 4.6m above sea level and faces the imminent danger posed by rising sea levels. Although the impacts of climate change were put forward on behalf of Alesana and his family, the case rested largely on humanitarian grounds. However the Immigration and Protection Tribunal did state that environmental degradation caused by climate change was already a feature of life in Tuvalu. Although this decision wasn't based on impacts of climate change that is not to say that climate change related factors weren't taken into consideration at all. The International Organization for Migration has put forward a working definition of environmental migrant:

Environmental migrants are persons or groups of persons who, predominantly for reasons of sudden or progressive change in the environment that adversely affects their lives or living conditions, are obliged to leave their habitual homes, or choose to do so, either temporarily or permanently, and who move within their country or abroad.

Until there is a legally binding definition of what constitutes an environmental migrant, it will be difficult for any true justice to be served. The concept of climate justice would see all human rights implemented in the most transparent way in order to maintain basic standards in the face of the somewhat unknown impacts that will be created by climate change.

=== Conflict ===
International peacebuilding NGO International Alert names 46 countries where climate change effects (including water scarcity, loss of arable land, extreme weather events, shortened growing seasons, and melting glaciers) may interact with economic, social, and political forces to create "a high risk of violent conflict."

=== Indigenous people ===
Indigenous peoples have a unique position when it comes to discussions on what impact climate change will have on a population. Many indigenous populations live subsistence lifestyles, which in turn are disrupted severely when it comes to the impact of climate change. In many countries, municipal law differs in application to indigenous peoples than the rest of the population, which complicates any legal remedy. Climate change impacts indigenous peoples differently not only because of their physical and spiritual connections to the land and water, but also because they have a specialised ecological and traditional knowledge that can be used to find the best mitigation strategy of those effects.

UN Human Rights organs have identified the rights of indigenous peoples as particularly vulnerable to the disruptive effects of climate change. Due to climate change, the livelihood and cultural identities of indigenous people have been threatened across the world in North America, Europe, Latin America, Africa, and Asia and the Pacific. Approximately 370 million indigenous people are affected.

=== Children's rights ===
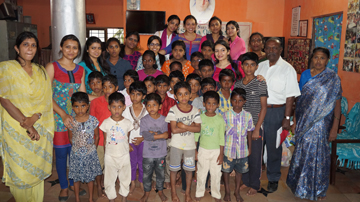
Child rights programme

Researchers at the Overseas Development Institute identified that children in South Asia may be particularly vulnerable to violations of human rights following climate related disasters. These can include gender-based violence, child labour, family break-ups and barriers to their development and learning. The researchers argue that child rights are rarely prioritised in policies to reduce disaster risk or adapt to climate change and that climate change adaptation policies must tailor interventions to address critical aspects of child rights, particularly child protection and education.

=== Development ===
Given that many of the world's poorest citizens depend directly on the environment for all or part of their daily livelihoods, many international development agencies see climate change and development as "inextricably linked."

== See also ==
- Right to a healthy environment
- One Health
- Paris Agreement
- Climate justice
- Environmental justice
- Oslo Principles on Global Climate Change Obligations
- Climate refugee
