= Oslo Principles =

Principles identifying the legal obligations to limit climate change

Oslo Principles on Global Climate Change Obligations
- Created: 2014
- Presented: March 1, 2015
- Author: Expert Group on Global Climate Obligations
- Purpose: Define the scope of legal obligations of states and enterprises relevant to climate change
- Also known as the Oslo Principles on Global Climate Obligations and the Oslo Principles on Global Obligations to Reduce Climate Change

The Oslo Principles, formally the Oslo Principles on Global Obligations to Reduce Climate Change, are a set of principles identifying the legal obligations of states (and companies) to limit climate change, as well as means of meeting these obligations. Written by an international group of legal experts, the Principles’ goal is to limit the rise in average global temperature to 2 degrees Celsius. The Oslo Principles were presented on March 30, 2015, at King’s College London.

The Oslo Principles draw on human rights law, international law, national environmental law and tort law to make the case that States and enterprises have an obligation to mitigate climate change under existing legal systems.

The rationale behind the Oslo Principles is that human rights includes the rights to life, food, water and a clean environment. As there is scientific consensus that these rights are under threat of climate change, continuing present carbon emissions trajectories will violate human rights. As human rights law is internationally legally binding, states and companies have an obligation to reduce carbon emissions even in the absence of a specific treaty. Additionally, international law recognizes the responsibility of a state’s activity across an international border, which is applicable to greenhouse gas emissions.

A major court ruling in line with the Oslo Principles is State of the Netherlands v. Urgenda Foundation, in which the court in The Hague ruled that the Dutch government has a legal obligation to reduce domestic carbon emissions to protect the human rights of its citizens.

== Principles ==
The Oslo Principles depart from the precautionary principle. Given the scientific consensus on the harms of anthropogenic climate change, greenhouse gas emissions should be reduced sufficiently to protect against the threat of climate change. The level of reduction to avoid these threats should be based on scientific “credible and realistic worst-case scenario”.

=== Obligations of states and enterprises ===
Under the Oslo Principles, both states and enterprises have the obligation to ensure that global warming is limited to 2 degrees Celsius. For this, they must reduce their greenhouse gas emissions “without relevant additional cost”. Additionally, states and enterprises ought to refrain from starting new activities that cause excessive emissions, such as building coal-fired power stations.

Additionally, the Principles state that developed and developing countries, and enterprises within them, must take measures to reduce greenhouse gas emissions when the costs of these measures will be offset by savings or financial gain. This principle applies to least developed countries, and enterprises within them, only when other entities provide the technical and financial means.

Despite obligations on the amount of greenhouse gas emissions required, states and enterprises can decide themselves on which measures they use to achieve their obligations.

The Oslo Principles state that all countries are subject to these obligations, no matter their contribution to total greenhouse gas emissions. When national law or international agreements set out lower targets, the obligations under the Oslo Principles are not affected.

=== Obligations of states ===
States are required to reduce their greenhouse gas emissions to its permissible level as fast as reasonably possible within their jurisdiction. The Oslo Principles state that the obligations of states to reduce greenhouse gas emissions are common, but differentiated: least developed countries are not obliged to pay for greenhouse gas emissions themselves. Countries that are close to their allowed level of emissions are not obligated to reduce their emissions if it would be too difficult considering its wealth, needs, fossil fuel dependence and possibilities for renewable energy. Countries that emit less than they are allowed still have a duty to avoid increasing emissions as the quantum of greenhouse gas emissions will go down over time. States must refrain from providing financing to projects that will increase greenhouse gas emissions unnecessarily high.

If a country fails to reduce its emissions sufficiently despite its efforts, it must finance further emissions in countries that are below their maximum allowed emissions. A lack of financial means does not allow a state to forgo its obligations, and states have an obligation to research ways to reduce emissions if they will likely not meet its obligations. Additionally, countries have the responsibility to enact trade consequences for countries that fail to meet their obligations.

States are also procedurally obliged to accept the jurisdiction of courts and publish information on climate change risks.

=== Obligations of enterprises ===
Enterprises are obliged to assess their vulnerability to climate change and ways to increase their resilience. This information must be public and accessible to stakeholders such as investors, clients and regulators. Fossil fuel companies specifically, must assess how restrictions on fossil fuel extraction will affect its financial situation.

Enterprises have to consider the greenhouse gas effects in projects they are considering to finance and must conduct environmental impact assessments when building major new facilities.

== Creation ==
The Oslo Principles were adopted by the Expert Group on Global Climate Obligations, which consists of experts in international law, human rights law, environmental law and tort law from universities, international courts and legal organisations. The members of this group participated in their individual capacities. The Principles are named after the city of Oslo, Norway, as this is where the authors came to consensus in 2014.

The expert group consisted of:

- Antonio Benjamin, Justice, High Court of Justice of Brazil
- Michael Gerrard, Andrew Sabin Professor of Professional Practice and Director, Sabin Center for Climate Change Law, Columbia University Law School
- Toon Huydecoper, retired Advocate-General of the Supreme Court of the Netherlands
- Michael Kirby, retired Justice of the High Court of Australia
- M.C. Mehta, advocate before the Supreme Court of India
- Thomas Pogge, Leitner Professor of Philosophy and International Affairs and Founding Director, Global Justice Program, Yale University
- Qin Tianbao, Professor of Environmental and International Law and Assistant Dean for International Affiliations, Wuhan University School of Law
- Dinah Shelton, Manatt/Ahn Professor of International Law, George Washington University and Law School, and Commissioner and former President, Inter-American Commission on Human Rights
- James Silk, Clinical Professor of Law, Allard K. Lowenstein International Human Rights Clinic, and Director, Orville H. Schell, Jr. Center for International Human Rights, Yale Law School
- Jessica Simor QC, barrister, Matrix Chambers, London
- Jaap Spier, Advocate-General of the Supreme Court of the Netherlands and Honorary Professor, Maastricht University Faculty of Law
- Elisabeth Steiner, Judge, European Court of Human Rights
- Philip Sutherland, Professor, Stellenbosch University Faculty of Law

== Reception ==
Guardian editor Julia Powles and climate lawyer Tessa Khan described the Oslo Principles in The Guardian as a "solution to our infuriating impasse" on government inaction on climate change.

Leiden University professor Ingrid Leijten called the Principles a "notable and welcome effort" in discovering an under-explored path to effectively addressing climate change. While still unsure about the legal status of the document, she described it as "further aid for reaching a sound legal conclusion" for the State of the Netherlands v. Urgenda Foundation court case.

Satvindar Nagra criticised the Oslo Principles for neglecting to engage with the legal implications of climate change displacement under international human rights law and refugee law.

The Oslo Principles primarily focus on the obligations of states over states over enterprises. To further specify the obligations of enterprises, the principles have been complemented by the Principles on Climate Obligations of Enterprises in 2020. Part of the authors of the Oslo Principles also worked on these new principles.

== See also ==
- Climate change litigation
- State of the Netherlands v. Urgenda Foundation
- Environmental law
- Human rights and climate change
- Climate justice
