= Malé Declaration on the Human Dimension of Global Climate Change =

Treaty on climate change and human rights

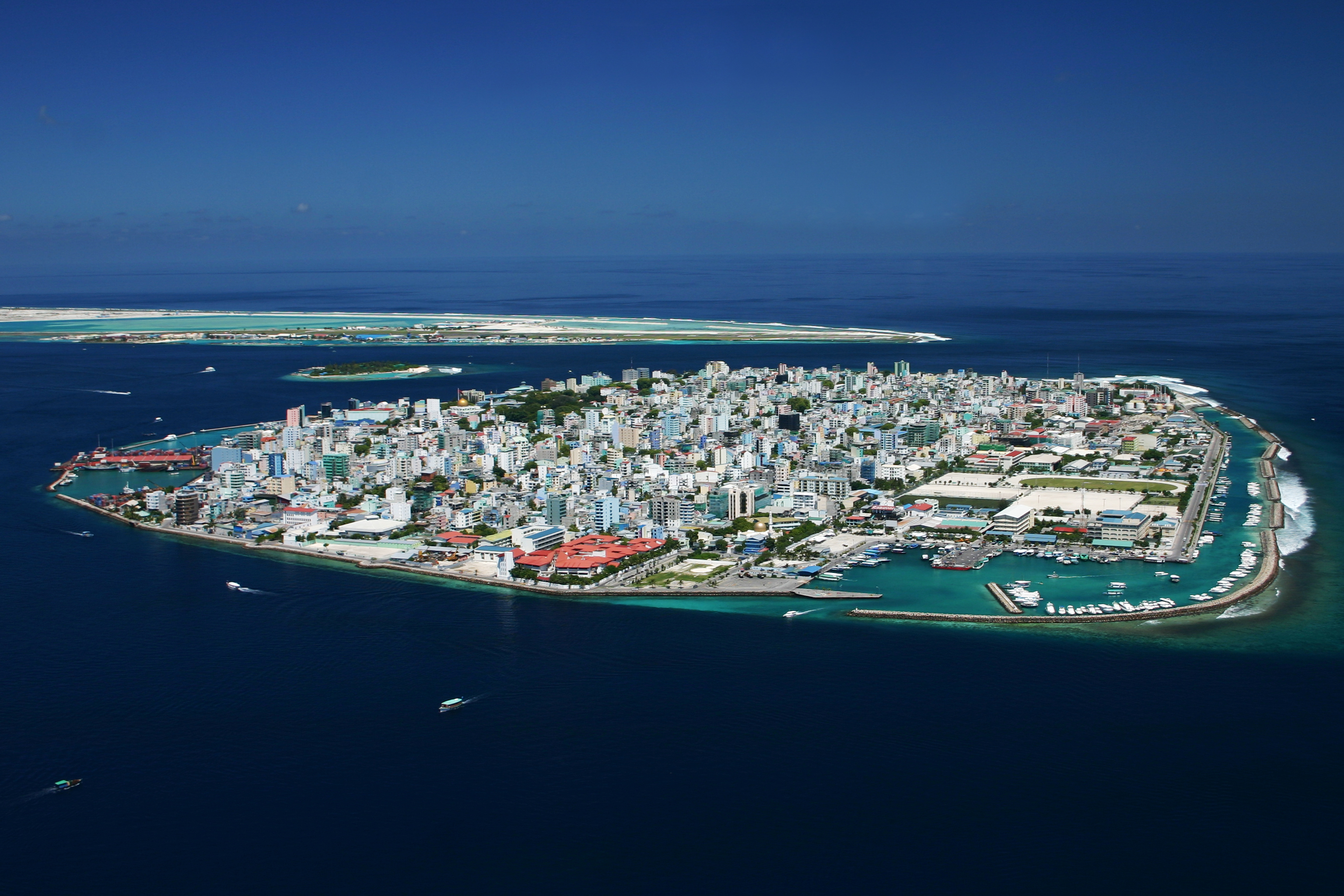
The island of Malé, Maldives, for which the Declaration is named

The Malé Declaration on the Human Dimension of Global Climate Change is a treaty made by representatives of several Small Island Developing States who came together to sign the declaration in November 2007. The Declaration's goal was to lay out a clear strategy to link climate change and human rights together. The Declaration also sought to change the agenda of the campaign to combat climate change from focusing on only the environmental impacts of climate change to also taking into account the human rights impacts of climate change. The Declaration makes clear that the right to a healthy environment is a prerequisite of all other basic human rights.

The Maldives, one signatory of the Declaration and whose capital Malé lends its name to the document, climate change has already begun to affect the human rights of the population. As such, the Maldives and other island nations have begun to construct an international coalition which uses human rights as a framework for combating climate change. The coalition in question has organized meetings on the topic of the Declaration in Geneva, New York, and Malé.

== United Nations ==
Signatories of the Declaration asked the UN Human Rights Council to focus its attention on the impacts of climate change and human rights. In response, the Office of the High Commissioner for Human Rights published the first study identifying specific ways in which climate change interferes with the full enjoyment of human rights, emphasizing that countries have a duty to work together to protect human rights from climate change. Specifically, the report highlighted several basic rights which were in danger, including rights to life, health, an adequate standard of living, and self determination.

== See also ==
- Climate change in the Maldives
