= Climate change in the Maldives =

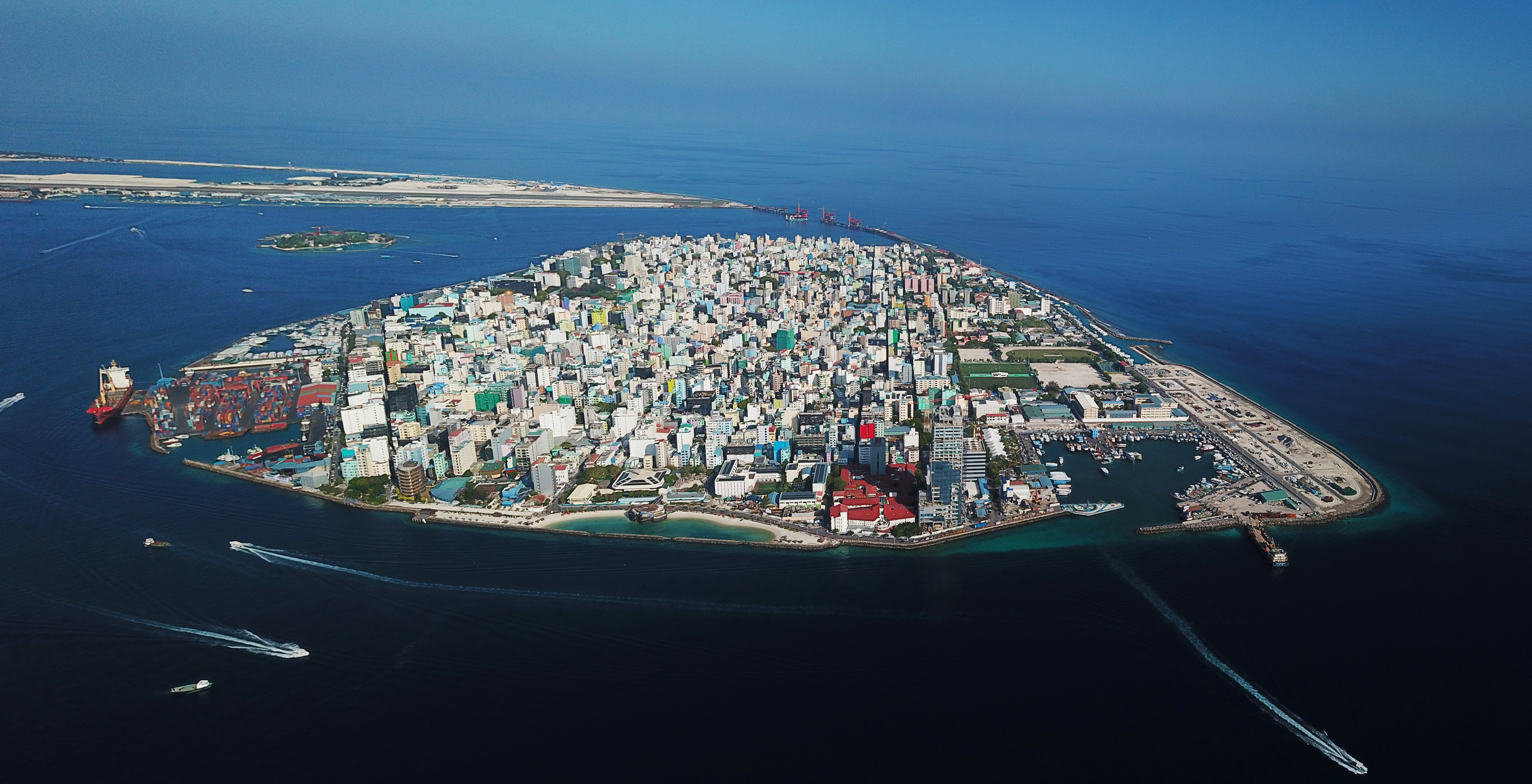
The Maldives government have adapted infrastructure in capital city Malé to the threats of climate change, including beginning to build a wall around the city.

Climate change is a major issue for the Maldives. As an archipelago of low-lying islands and atolls in the Indian Ocean, the existence of the Maldives is severely threatened by sea level rise. By 2050, 80% of the country could become uninhabitable due to global warming. According to the World Bank, with "future sea levels projected to increase in the range of 10 to 100 centimeters by the year 2100, the entire country could be submerged". The Maldives is striving to adapt to climate change, and Maldivian authorities have been prominent in international political advocacy to implement climate change mitigation.

== Sea level rise ==
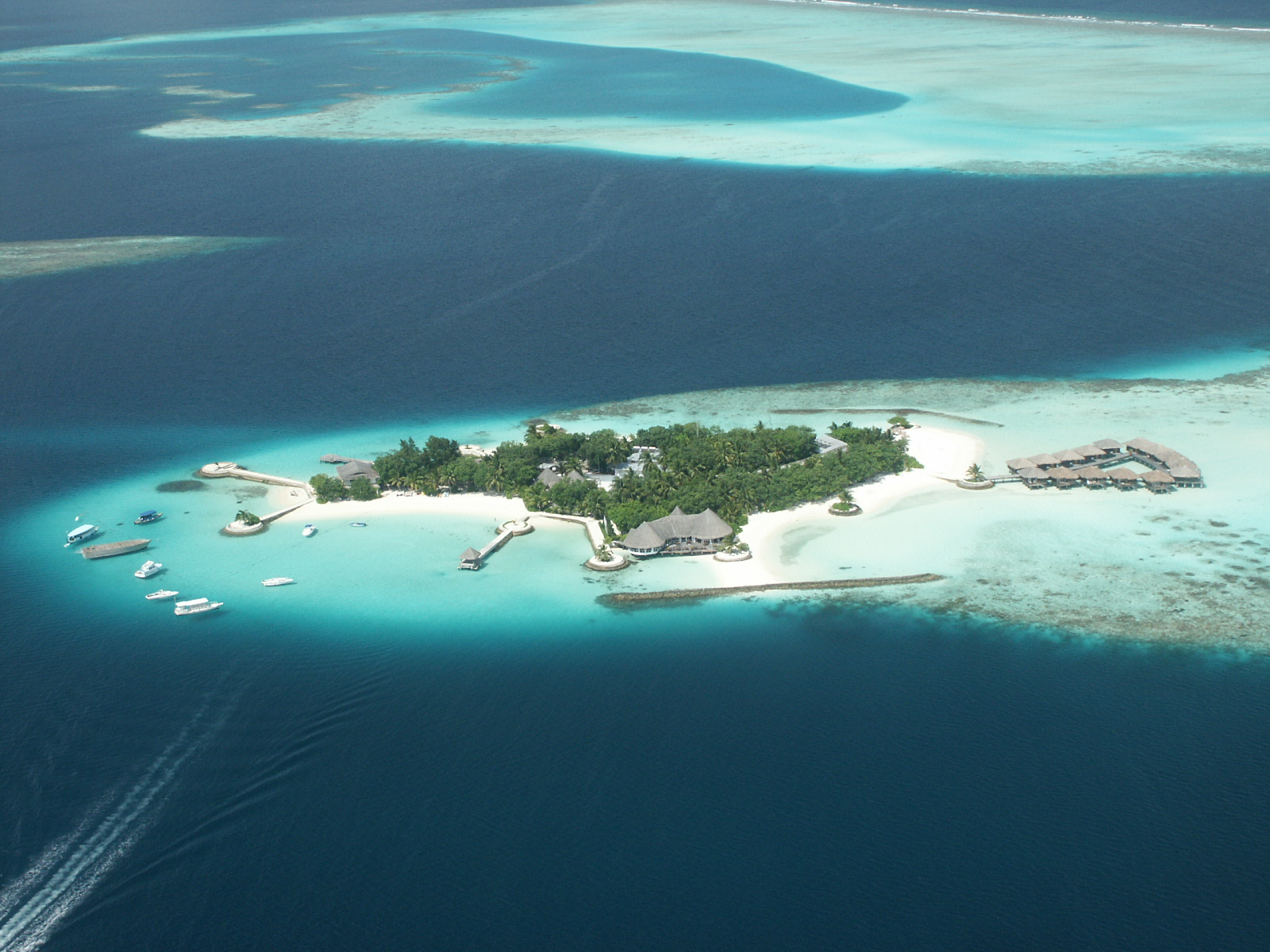
Several islands of the Maldives are threatened by sea level rise.

In 1988, Maldivian authorities believed that rising seas could already entirely cover the nation within the next 30 years, stating that "an estimated rise of 20 to 30 centimetres in the next 20 to 40 years [would] be 'catastrophic'". By 2021, 90% of islands in the Maldives experienced severe erosion, 97% of the country no longer had fresh groundwater, and more than 50% of the national budget was being spent on efforts to adapt to the effects of climate change. The country lost one of its primary natural defenses in a 2016 bleaching event that affected about 60% of its coral reefs.

The Intergovernmental Panel on Climate Change's 2007 report predicted the upper limit of the sea level rises will be 59 centimetres (23 in) by 2100, which means that most of the Maldives' 200 inhabited islands may need to be abandoned. According to researchers from the University of Southampton, the Maldives are the third most endangered island nation due to flooding from climate change as a percentage of population.

In 2020, a three-year study at the University of Plymouth which looked at the Maldives and the Marshall Islands, found that tides move sediment to create a higher elevation, a morphological response that could help low-lying islands adjust to sea level rise and keep the islands habitable. The research also reported that sea walls were compromising the islands’ ability to adjust to rising sea levels and that island drowning is an inevitable outcome for islands with coastal structures like sea walls. Hideki Kanamaru, natural resources officer with the Food and Agriculture Organization in Asia-Pacific, said the study provided a "new perspective" on how island nations could tackle the challenge of sea-level rise, and that even if islands can adapt naturally to higher seas by raising their own crests, humans still needed to double down on global warming and protection for island populations.

However, despite the rise in sea levels the atolls making up the Maldives have grown in area in response, by perhaps 8% in 60 years.

== Effects on people ==
Most people in the Maldives live on small, flat, densely populated atolls that are threatened by violent storms or even the slightest sea level rise. The capital Malé is especially threatened because it is on a small, flat, extremely densely populated atoll that is surrounded by sea walls, and other barriers to protect against storms. This means the Malé atoll cannot change shape in response to rising sea levels and is increasingly reliant on expensive engineering solutions.

Climate change will also have significant implications for tourism in the Maldives.

== Effects on the environment ==
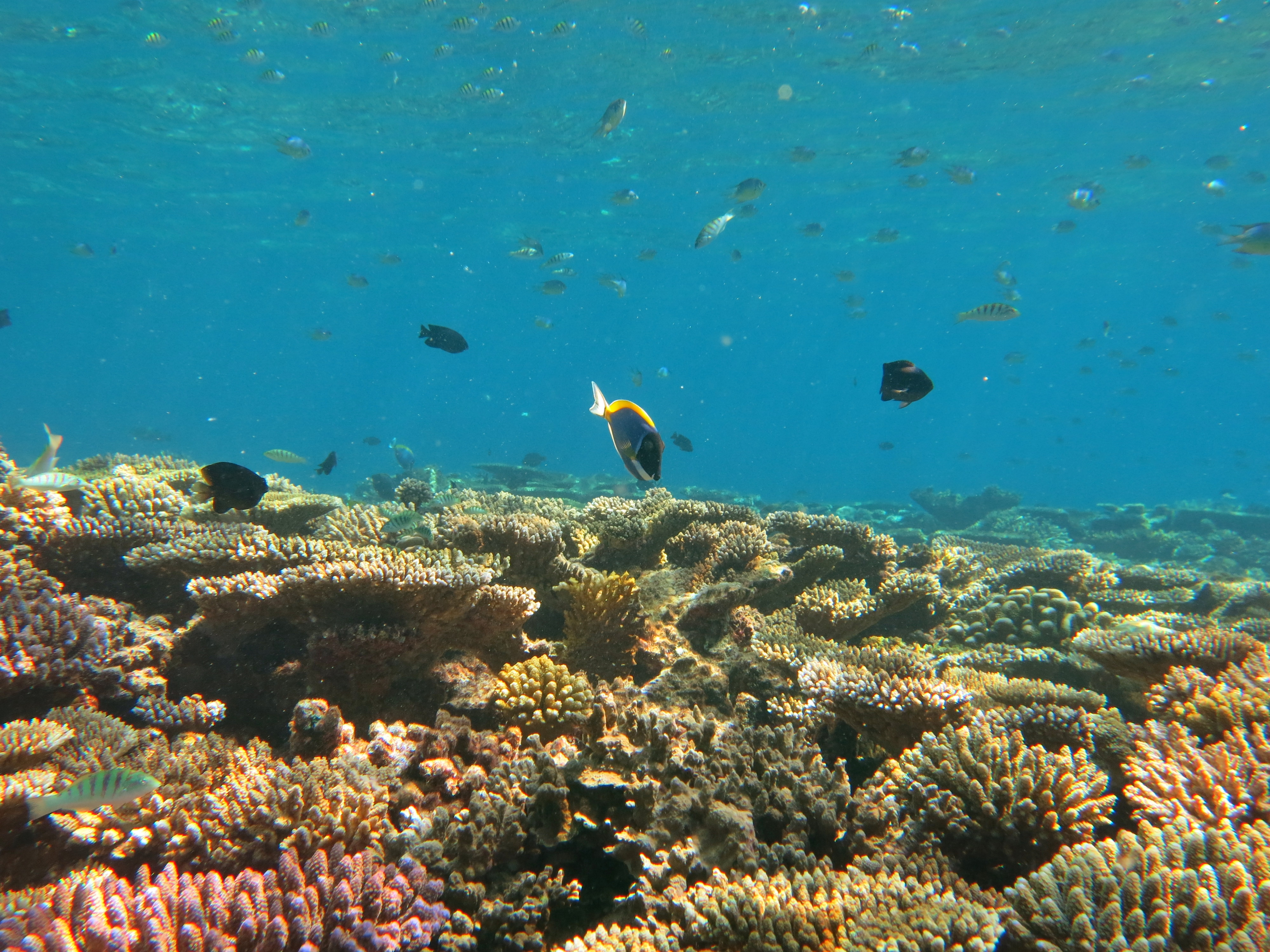
Coral reef in Baa Atoll.

The Maldives contains 3% of the world's coral reefs, which are impacted by climate change. The 2016 global coral bleaching event greatly impacted coral reefs across the Maldives, with such events expected to become more frequent and severe due to climate change.

== Mitigation and adaptation ==
=== Mitigation ===
In 2009, President Mohamed Nasheed announced a plan to make the country carbon neutral and pursue a renewable energy transition in the following decade. Maldives planned to eliminate or offset all of its greenhouse gas emissions. At the 2009 International Climate Talks, Nasheed explained that:

For us swearing off fossil fuels is not only the right thing to do, but it is also in our economic self-interest... Pioneering countries will free themselves from the unpredictable price of foreign oil; they will capitalise on the new green economy of the future, and they will enhance their moral standing giving them greater political influence on the world stage.

In 2017, the government of Abdulla Yameen changed the policy, instead aiming to be a low carbon country and prioritising development. Environment minister Thoriq Ibrahim said "We are going nowhere. The dream [of making the Maldives carbon neutral] is over. We are looking to be a low-carbon country."

=== Adaptation ===
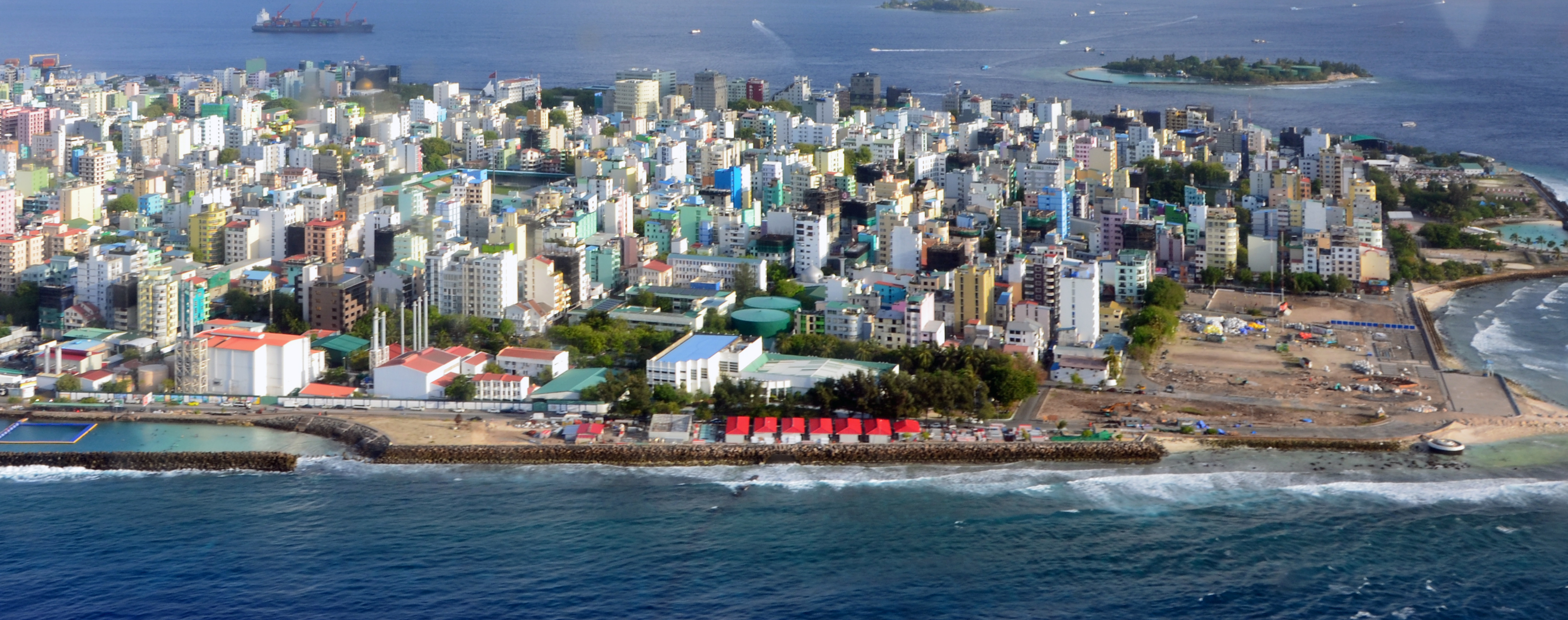
Malé, Maldives' capital, is threatened by climate change.

To defend against climate change and the resulting sea level rise, the national government of the Maldives has prepared a comprehensive National Adaptation Programme of Action, that attempts to critically consider and alleviate many of the serious threats the Maldives faces. The Maldives has implemented measures to combat sea level rise, including a wall around the capital Malé and refurnishing local infrastructure, particularly ports. The country began a large-scale land reclamation project in Hulhumalé in the late 1990s, partly in preparation for relocation from elsewhere in the country. A Dutch company has proposed building 5000 floating homes near Malé.

In 2008, Nasheed announced plans to look into purchasing new land in India, Sri Lanka, and Australia because of his concerns about global warming, and the possibility of much of the islands being inundated by the rising sea. The purchase of land will be made from a fund generated by tourism. The president explained his intentions: "We do not want to leave the Maldives, but we also do not want to be climate refugees living in tents for decades".

=== International cooperation ===
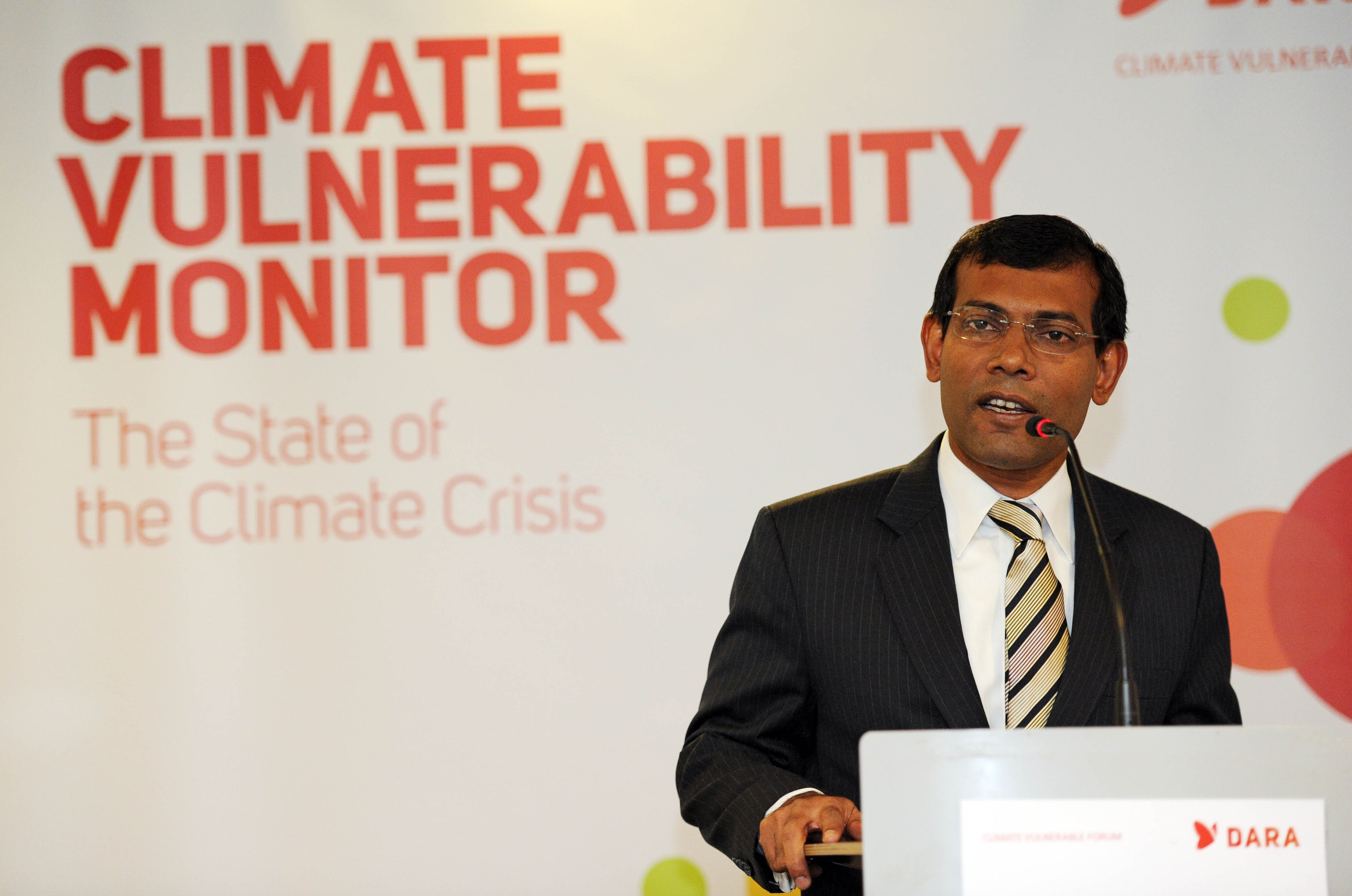
Maldives President Mohamed Nasheed speaks at the launch of the Climate Vulnerability Monitor in 2010.

Advocacy for climate change mitigation is a key component of the Maldives' foreign policy. Concerns over sea level rise were expressed by President Maumoon Abdul Gayoom at the 1997 United Nations General Assembly. President Mohamed Nasheed said in 2012 that "If carbon emissions continue at the rate they are climbing today, my country will be under water in seven years." He called for more climate change mitigation action while on the American television shows The Daily Show and the Late Show with David Letterman, and hosted "the world's first underwater cabinet meeting" in 2009 to raise awareness of the threats posed by climate change.

Gayoom said in 2016, "to the three hundred thousand inhabitants of the Maldives none of these threats compare, in magnitude and likelihood, to global climate change and consequent sea level rise." Former environment minister for the Maldives, Mohamed Aslam, said "If Maldives can do it, you can do it. It's important to us not just to talk but to lead by example".

== Society and climate change ==
=== Public opinion ===
A 2017 study of Maldivians' public opinion on climate change found that "more than 50% of respondents perceive future sea-level rise to be a serious challenge at the national level and they accept that migration from islands to other countries might be a potential option", although religious and cultural factors played a role.

== See also ==
- Effects of climate change on island nations
- Climate change in South Asia
- Malé Declaration on the Human Dimension of Global Climate Change
- The Island President
