= Climate change and poverty =

Correlation of disproportionate impacts of climate on impoverished people

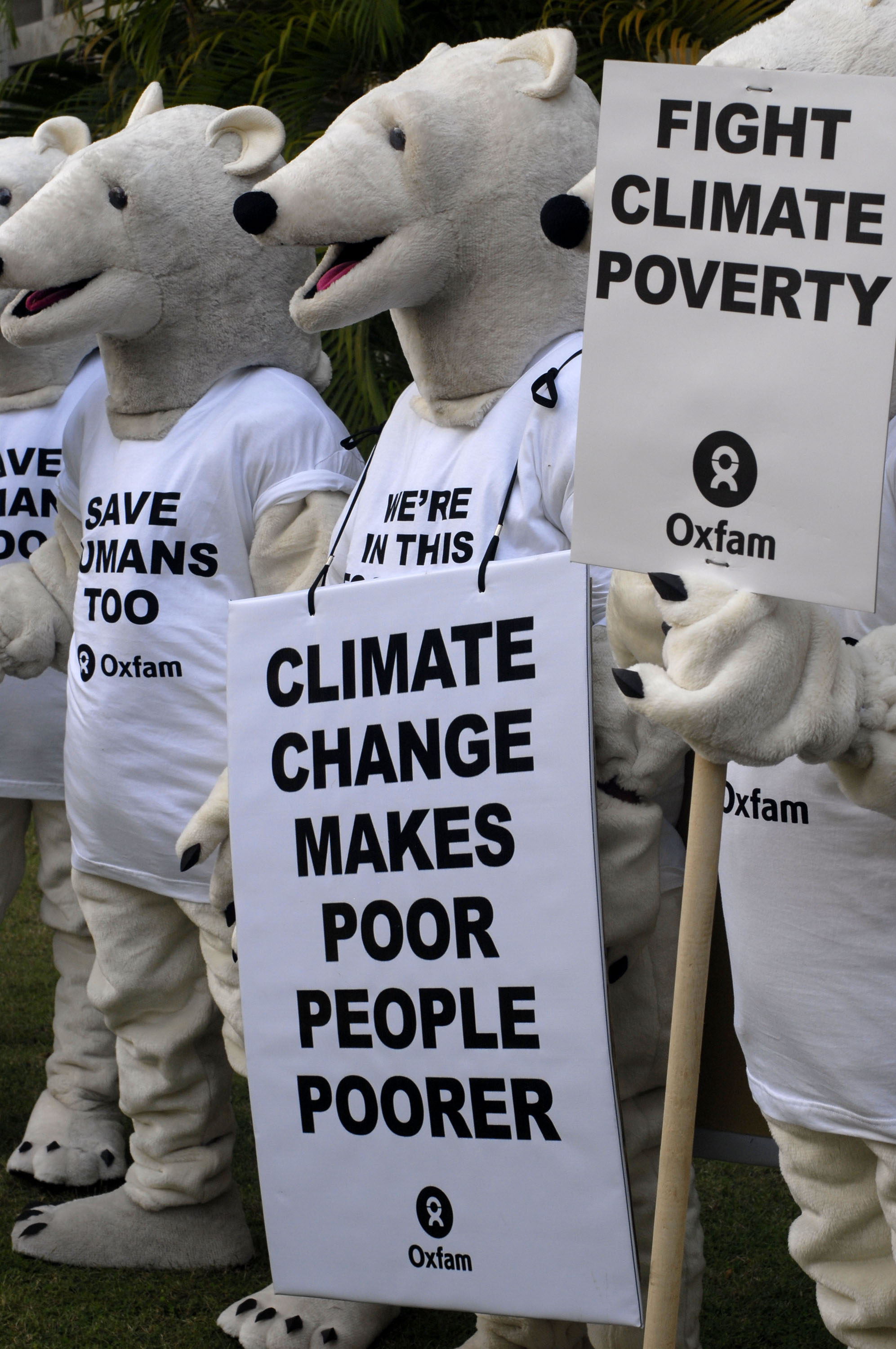
Demonstration against climate poverty (2007)

Climate change and poverty are deeply intertwined because climate change disproportionally affects poor people in low-income communities and developing countries around the world. The impoverished have a higher chance of experiencing the ill-effects of climate change due to the increased exposure and vulnerability. Vulnerability represents the degree to which a system is susceptible to, or unable to cope with, adverse effects of climate change including climate variability and extremes.

Climate change highly exacerbates existing inequalities through its effects on health, the economy, and human rights. The Intergovernmental Panel on Climate Change's (IPCC) Fourth National Climate Assessment Report found that low-income individuals and communities are more exposed to environmental hazards and pollution and have a harder time recovering from the impacts of climate change. For example, it takes longer for low-income communities to be rebuilt after natural disasters. According to the United Nations Development Programme, developing countries suffer 99% of the casualties attributable to climate change.

Different countries' impact on climate change also varies based on their stage of development; the 50 least developed countries of the world account for a 1% contribution to the worldwide emissions of greenhouse gases, which are a byproduct of global warming. Additionally, 92% of accumulated greenhouse gas emissions can be attributed to countries from the Global North, which comprise 19% of the global population, while 8% of emissions are attributed to countries from the Global South, who bear the heaviest consequences of increasing global temperature.

Climate and distributive justice questions are central to climate change policy options. Many policy tools can be employed to solve environmental problems such as cost-benefit analysis; however, such tools usually do not deal with such issues because they often ignore questions of just distribution and the environmental effects on human rights.

== Connection to poverty ==
Estimates of damage to GDP vary widely, and even this approach to predicting damage does not consider impacts of climate tipping points, climate-driven extreme events, human health impacts, resource or migration-driven conflict, geopolitical tension, nature-driven risks, or sea level rise.

A 2020 World Bank paper estimated that between 32 million and 132 million additional people will be pushed into extreme poverty by 2030 due to climate change. The cycle of poverty exacerbates the potential negative impacts of climate change. This phenomenon is defined when poor families become trapped in poverty for at least three generations, have limited to no resources access, and are disadvantaged in means of breaking the cycle. While in rich countries, coping with climate change has largely been a matter of dealing with longer, hotter summers, and observing seasonal shifts; for those in poverty, weather-related disasters, bad harvest, or even a family member falling ill can provide crippling economic shocks.

Besides these economic shocks, the widespread famine, drought, and potential humanistic shocks could affect the entire nation. High levels of poverty and low levels of human development limit the capacity of poor households to manage climate risks. With limited access to formal insurance, low incomes, and meager assets, poor households have to deal with climate-related shocks under highly constrained conditions. In addition, poorer households are heavily impacted by environmental shocks due to the lack of post-shock support from friends and family, the financial system, and social safety nets.

=== Relationship to environmental racism ===
As global climate has changed progressively over the past several decades, it has collided with environmental racism. The overlap of these two phenomena, has disproportionately affected different communities and populations throughout the world due to disparities in socio-economic status. This is especially evident in the Global South where, for example, byproducts of global climate change such as increasingly frequent and severe landslides resulting from more heavy rainfall events in Quito, Ecuador force people to also deal with profound socio-economic ramifications like the destruction of their homes and death. Countries such as Ecuador often contribute relatively little to climate change in terms of carbon dioxide emissions but have far fewer resources to ward off the negative localized impacts of climate change. This issue occurs globally, where nations in the global south bear the burden of natural disasters and weather extremes despite contributing little to the global carbon footprint.

While people living in the Global South have typically been impacted most by the effects of climate change, people of color in the Global North also face similar situations in several areas. The issues of climate change and communities that are in a danger zone are not limited to North America or the United States either. Environmental racism and climate change coincide with one another. Rising seas affect poor areas such as Kivalina, Alaska, and Thibodaux, Louisiana, and countless other places around the globe.

Impacts of environmental racism due to climate change become particularly evident during climate disasters. Following the 1995 Chicago heat wave, scholars analyzed the effects of environmental racism on the unequal death rate between races during this crisis. Direct impacts of this phenomenon can be observed through the lack of adequate warning and the failure to utilize pre-existing cooling centers which disadvantaged impoverished groups, and caused particularly devastating effects in Chicago's poorest areas. Poorer individuals are more susceptible to harm from climate change because they have less access to resources to help them recover from natural disasters. With the number of climate disasters increasing dramatically over the past 50 years, the impacts of environmental racism has increased, and social movements calling for environmental justice have grown in turn.

==== Atmospheric colonization ====
The concept of 'atmospheric colonization' refers to the observation that 92% of accumulated greenhouse gas emissions are attributable to countries from the Global North, comprising 19% of global population, while only 8% of emissions are attributable to countries from the Global South that will bear the heaviest consequences of increasing global temperatures.

A 2020 World Bank paper estimated that between 32 million and 132 million additional people will be pushed into extreme poverty by 2030 due to climate change.

== Reversing development ==
Climate change is globally encompassing and can reverse development in some areas in the following ways.

=== Agricultural production and food security ===
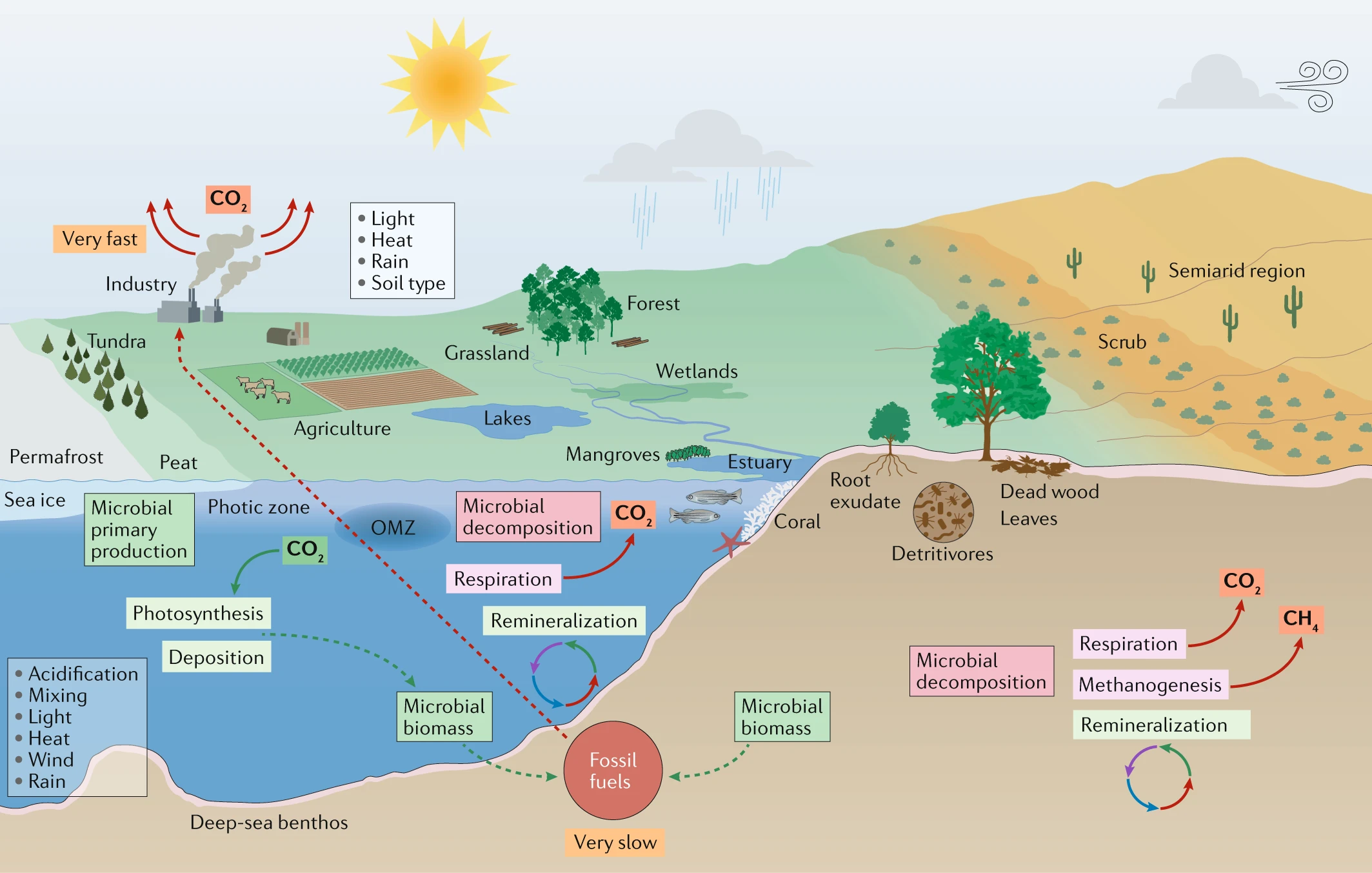
Microorganisms and climate change

There has been considerable research comparing the interrelated processes of climate change on agriculture. Climate change affects rainfall, temperature, and water availability for agriculture in vulnerable areas. It also affects agriculture in several ways including productivity, agricultural practices, environmental effects, and distribution of rural space. Extreme events such as droughts, disease, and pests will be heavily impacted resulting in an increase of food prices from 3-84% by the year 2050. Additional numbers affected by malnutrition could rise to 600 million by 2080. Climate change could worsen the prevalence of hunger through direct negative effects on production and indirect impacts on purchasing powers.

=== Water insecurity ===
Of the 3 billion growth in population projected worldwide by the mid-21st century, the majority will be born in countries already experiencing water shortages. As the overall climate of the earth warms, changes in the nature of global rainfall, evaporation, snow, and runoff flows will be affected. Safe water sources are essential for survival within a community. Manifestations of the projected water crisis include inadequate access to safe drinking water for about 884 million people as well as inadequate access to water for sanitation and water disposal for 2.5 billion people. As waters become warmer, hazardous algae and other bacteria growth increase, not only contaminating the water that we drink but also the seafood that we consume. With a population ranging between 198 and 210 million people in Nigeria, existing sanitation and water infrastructural facilities remain inadequate with 2.2 billion people lacking access to safe water and 4.2 billion lacking safe sanitations both in the rural and urban areas.

=== Rising sea levels and exposure to climate disasters ===
Sea levels could rise rapidly with accelerated ice sheet disintegration. Global temperature increases of 3–4 degrees C could result in 330 million people being permanently or temporarily displaced through flooding Warming seas will also fuel more intense tropical storms. The destruction of coastal landscapes exacerbates the damage done by this increase in storms. Wetlands, forests, and mangroves have been removed for land development. These features usually slow runoff, storm surges, and prevent debris from being carried by flooding. Developing over these areas has increased the destructive power of floods and makes homeowners more susceptible to extreme weather events. Flooding causes the risk of submersion of lands in coastal areas in densely populated poverty areas, such as Alexandria and Port Said in Egypt, Lagos and Port Harcourt in Nigeria, and Cotonou in Benin. In some areas, such as coastal properties, real estate prices go up because of ocean access and housing scarcity, in part caused by homes being destroyed during storms. Wealthy homeowners have more resources to rebuild their homes and have better job security, which encourages them to stay in their communities following extreme weather events. Highly unstable areas, such as slopes and delta regions, are sold to lower-income families at a cheaper price point. After extreme weather events, Impoverished people have a difficult time finding or maintaining a job and rebuilding their homes. These challenges force many to relocate in search of job opportunities and housing.

=== Ecosystems and biodiversity ===
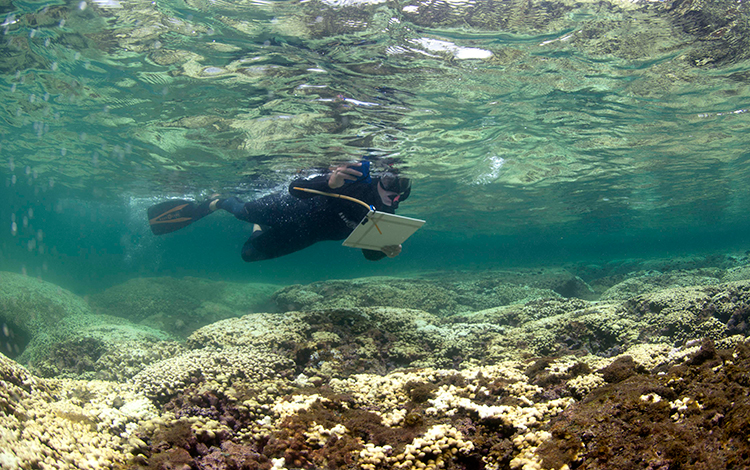
Coral bleaching of coral reefs in Hawaii

Climate change is already transforming ecological systems. Around one-half of the world's coral reef systems have suffered bleaching as a result of warming seas. In addition, the direct human pressures that might be experienced include overfishing which could lead to resource depletion, nutrient, and chemical pollution and poor land-use practices such as deforestation and dredging. Also, climate change may increase the number of arable land in high-latitude regions by reduction of the number of frozen lands. A 2005 study reports that temperature in Siberia has increased three degrees Celsius on average since 1960, which is reportedly more than in other areas of the world.

=== Human health ===
A direct effect is an increase in temperature-related illnesses and deaths related to prolonged heat waves and humidity. Climate change could also change the geographic range of vector-borne, specifically mosquito-borne diseases such as malaria and dengue fever exposing new populations to the disease. Because a changing climate affects the essential ingredients of maintaining good health: clean air and water, sufficient food, and adequate shelter, the effects could be widespread and pervasive. The report of the WHO Commission on Social Determinants of Health points out that disadvantaged communities are likely to shoulder a disproportionate share of the burden of climate change because of their increased exposure and vulnerability to health threats. Over 90 percent of malaria and diarrhea deaths are borne by children aged 5 years or younger, mostly in developing countries. Other severely affected population groups include women, the elderly, and people living in small island developing states and other coastal regions, mega-cities, or mountainous areas.

==== Aspects of Climate Change on Human Health ====
Likely Relative Impact on Health Outcomes of the Components of Climate Change

Health outcome	Change in mean, temperature...	extreme events	Rate of change of climate variable	Day-night difference
Heat-related deaths and illness		+++		+
Physical and psychological trauma due to disasters		++++		
Vector-borne diseases	+++	++	+	++
Non-vector-borne infectious diseases	+	+		
Food availability and hunger	++	+	++	
Consequences of sea level rise	++	++	+	
Respiratory effects: -air pollutants -pollens, humidity	+ ++	++		+
Population displacement	++	+	+	

++++= great effect; += small effect; empty cells indicate no known relationship.

=== Human rights and democracy ===
In June 2019, United Nations Special Rapporteur Philip Alston warned of a "climate apartheid" where the rich pay to escape the effects of climate change while the rest of the world suffers, potentially undermining basic human rights, democracy, and the rule of law. When Superstorm Sandy struck in 2012, he recounts, most people in New York City were left without power, while the Goldman Sachs headquarters had a private generator and protection by "tens of thousands of its own sandbags".

An approach that is currently trying to be established by combining human rights with the effects of climate change is an HBRA law. An HBRA law is the adoption of a human rights-based approach (HRBA) to address climate change, from both a legal and a policy perspective. This approach is an advocacy created by younger generations that are preparing for future climate change incidents that could potentially affect future generations.

== Security impacts ==
The concept of human security and the effects that climate change may have on it will become increasingly important as the effects become more apparent. Some effects are already evident and will become very clear in the human and climatic short-run (2007–2020). They will increase and others will manifest themselves in the medium term (2021–2050); whilst in the long run (2051–2100), they will all be active and interacting strongly with other major trends. There is the potential for the end of the petroleum economy for many producing and consuming nations, possible financial and economic crisis, a larger population of humans, and a much more urbanized humanity – far in excess of the 50% now living in small to very large cities. All these processes will be accompanied by the redistribution of the population nationally and internationally. Such redistributions typically have significant gender dimensions; for example, extreme event impacts can lead to male out migration in search of work, culminating in an increase in women-headed households – a group often considered particularly vulnerable. Indeed, the effects of climate change on impoverished women and children is crucial in that women and children, in particular, have unequal human capabilities. An example of a predicted trend called "The Great Migration" is estimated to affect millions of Americans in the year 2070. Due to the impacts of climate change millions will be forced to relocate. To accommodate TGM, the U.S. will need 25–30 million new housing units. Failure to build these new units will increase material deprivation and poverty.

== Infrastructure impacts ==
The potential effects of climate change and the security of infrastructure will have the most direct effect on the poverty cycle. Areas of infrastructure effects will include water systems, housing and settlements, transport networks, utilities, and industry. Infrastructure designers can contribute in three areas for improving the living environment for the poor, in building design, in settlement planning and design as well as in urban planning.

The National Research Council has identified five climate changes of particular importance to infrastructure and factors that should be taken into consideration when designing future structures. These factors include increases in very hot days and heat waves, increases in Arctic temperatures, rising sea levels, increases in intense precipitation events, and increases in hurricane intensity. Heat waves affect communities that live in traditionally cooler areas because many of the homes are not equipped with air conditioning units. Rising sea levels can be devastating for poor countries situated near the ocean and in delta regions, which experience increasingly overwhelming storm damage. In parts of eastern Caribbean nations, almost 60 percent of the homes were constructed without any building regulations. Many of these endangered populations are also affected by an increase in flooding in locations that lack adequate drainage. In 1998, close to 200 million people were affected by flooding in China's Yangtze River Valley; and in 2010, flooding in Pakistan affected 20 million people. These issues are made worse for people living in lower income areas and force them to relocate at a higher rate than other economic groups.

In areas where poverty is prevalent and infrastructure is underdeveloped, climate change produces a critical threat to the future development of that country. Reports of a study done on ten geographically and economically diverse countries show how nine out of ten countries revealed an inability to develop infrastructures and its expensive maintenance due to the influence of climate change and cost.

== Proposed policy solutions ==
=== Mitigation efforts ===
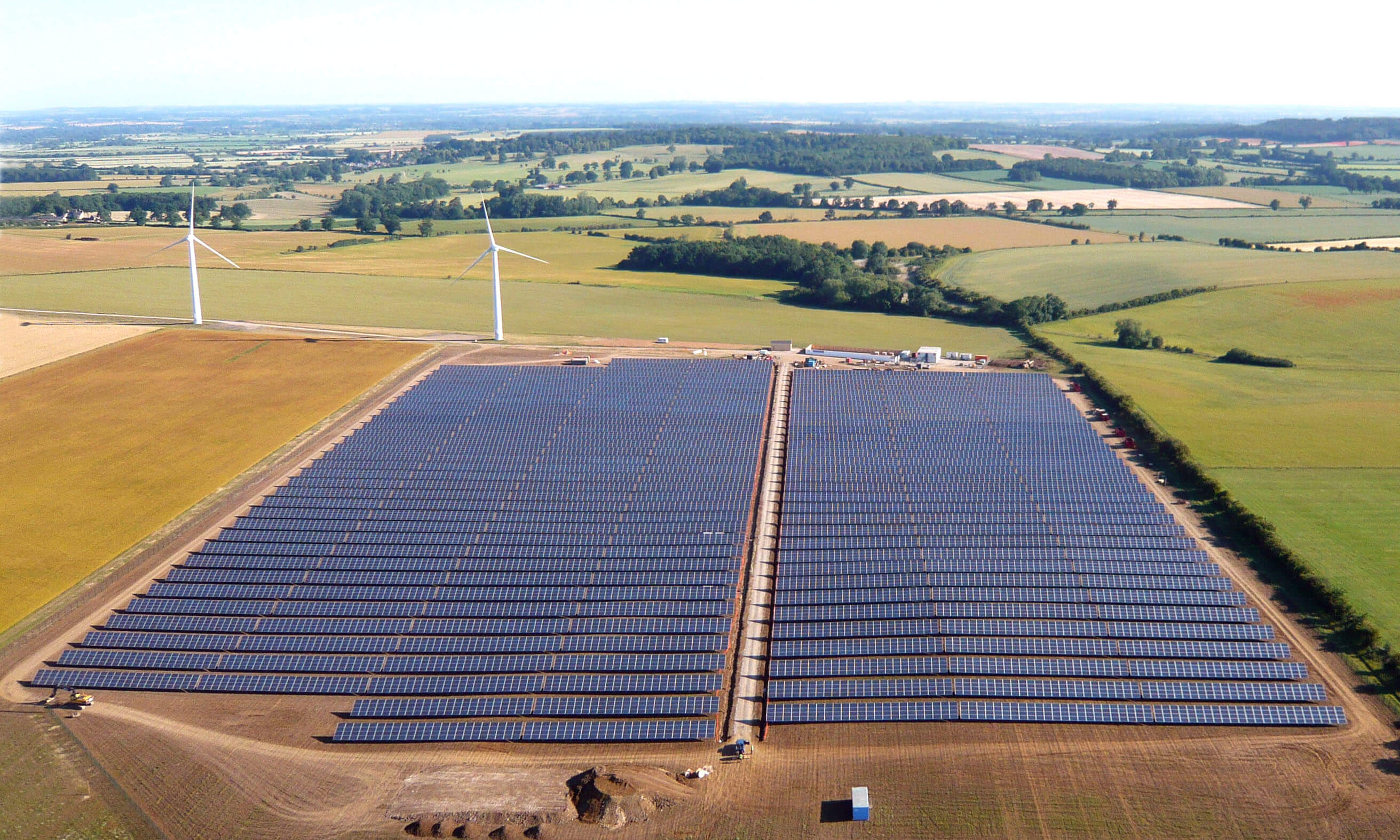
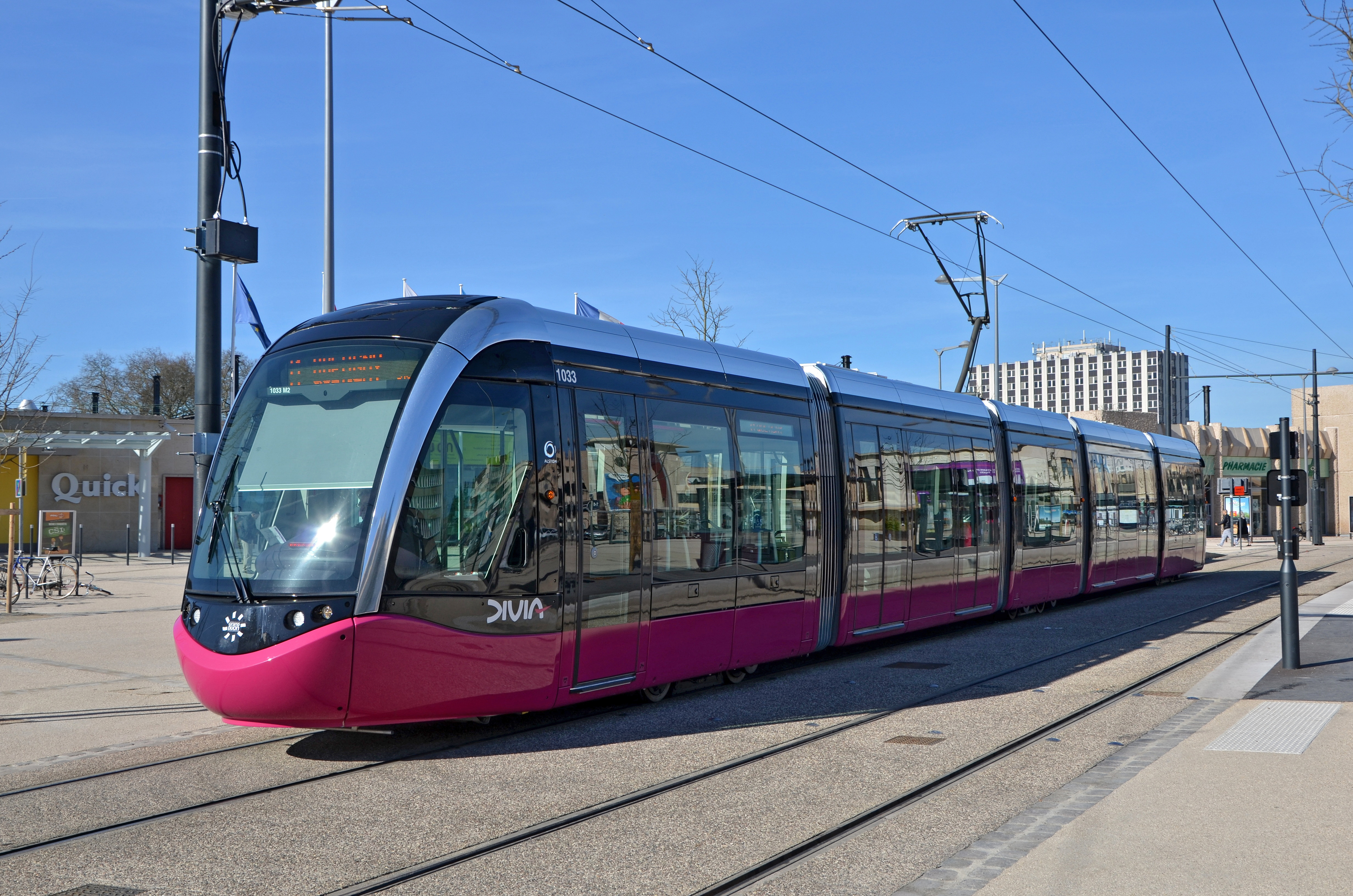
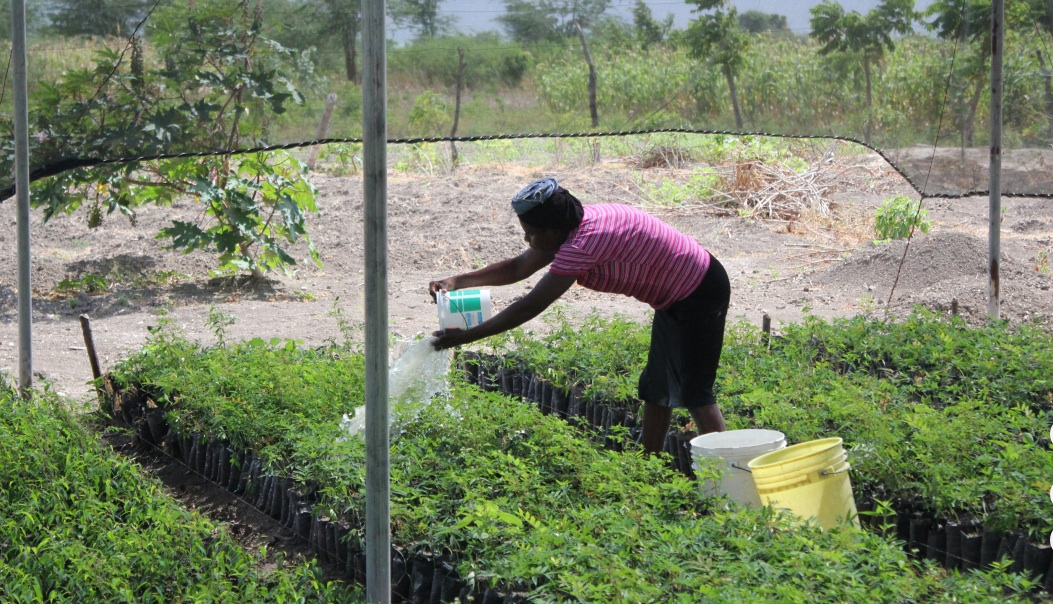
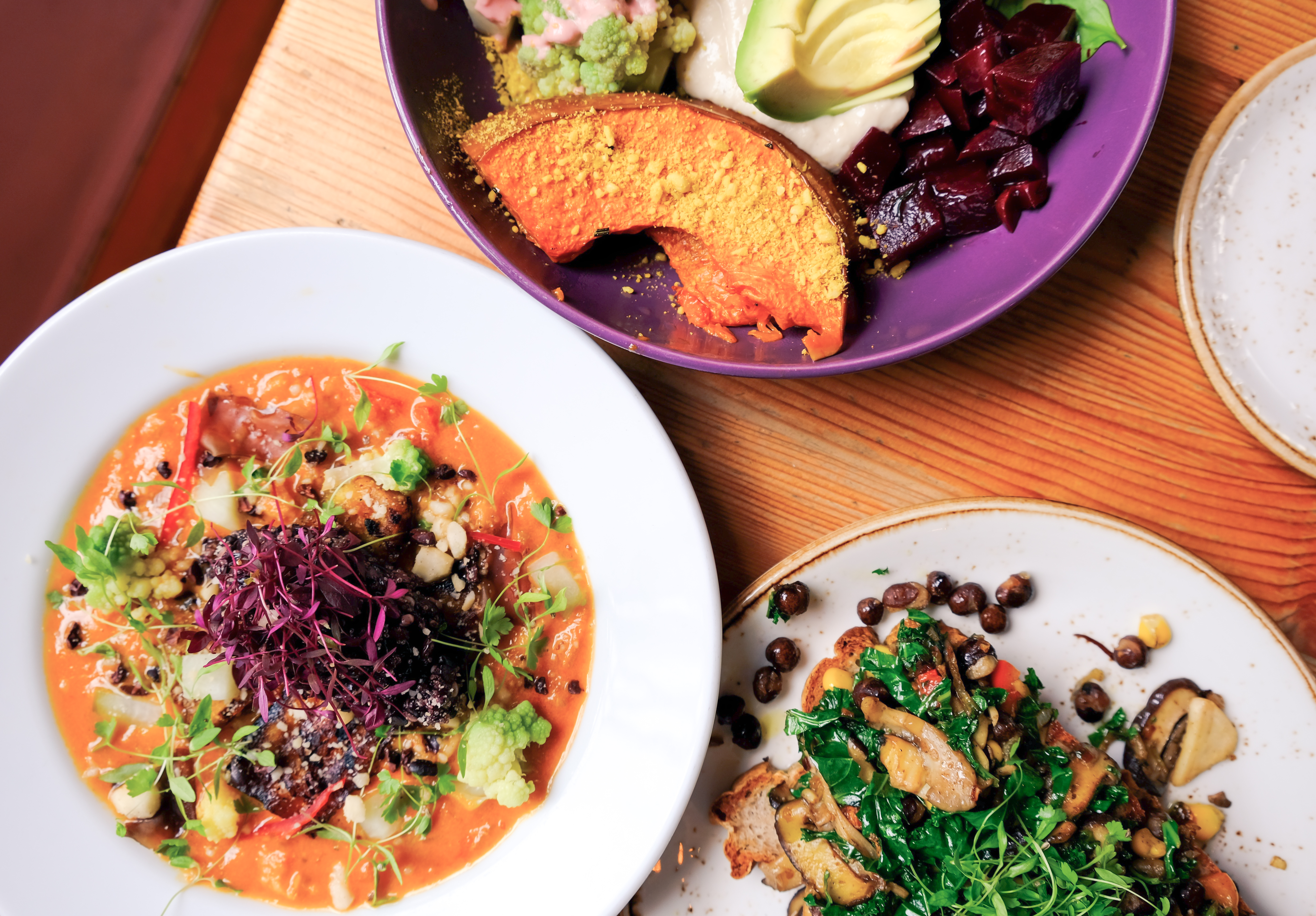
Various aspects of climate change mitigation: Renewable energy (solar and wind power) in England, electrified public transport in France, a reforestation project in Haiti to remove carbon dioxide from the atmosphere, and an example of a plant-based meal

Climate change mitigation, also called decarbonisation, is an action to limit the greenhouse gases in the atmosphere that cause climate change. Climate change mitigation actions include conserving energy and replacing fossil fuels with clean energy sources. Secondary mitigation strategies include changes to land use and removing carbon dioxide (CO_{2}) from the atmosphere. 2022 assessments emphasize that global greenhouse gas emissions must peak before 2025 and decline by about 43% by 2030 to limit warming to 1.5 °C, requiring rapid transitions in energy, transport, and land-use systems.

=== Adaptation efforts ===
Adaptation to global warming involves actions to tolerate the effects of global warming. Collaborative research from the Institute of Development Studies draws links between adaptation and poverty to help develop an agenda for pro-poor adaptation that can inform climate-resilient poverty reduction. Adaptation to climate change will be "ineffective and inequitable if it fails to learn and build upon an understanding of the multidimensional and differentiated nature of poverty and vulnerability". Poorer countries tend to be more seriously affected by climate change, yet have reduced assets and capacities with which to adapt. One can see this effect by comparing outcomes between Bangladesh and the United States following two severe storms. In the United States, Hurricane Andrew killed 23 people when it made landfall in 1992; however, one year before, in Bangladesh, a tropical cyclone killed approximately 100,000 people. Bangladesh, having a poorer population, was less prepared for the storm; and the country lacked sufficient weather forecasting systems needed to predict meteorological events. After the storm, Bangladesh required assistance from the international community because it didn't possess the funds needed to recover. As events like these increase in their frequency and severity, a more proactive approach is needed. This has led to more activities to integrate adaptation within development and poverty reduction programs. The rise of adaptation as a development issue has been influenced by concerns around minimizing threats to progress on poverty reduction, notably the Millennium Development Goals, and by the injustice of impacts that are felt hardest by those who have done least to contribute to the problem, framing adaptation as an equity and human rights issue.

Other solutions include increasing access to quality health care for poor people and people of color, preparedness planning for urban heat island effects, identifying neighborhoods that are most likely to be impacted, investing in alternative fuel and energy research, and measuring the results of policy impacts.

=== Regional effects ===
Regional effects from global climate change varies from country to country. Many countries have different approaches to how they adapt to global climate change versus others. Bigger countries with more resources do not react the same as a country with less resources to use. Urgency to fix the problem is not present until the effect of global climate change is felt directly. Bangladesh is just one of the many examples of people being affected because they are not properly prepared to face global climate. Workers in the agriculture field in these countries specifically are affected more than others but the extent to how much each agriculture worker is affected varies from region to region.

A country that exemplifies the inequality that is created due to varying effects in different regions by climate change is Nigeria. Nigeria is a country that mainly relies on oil as its main money generator, but is being affected by climate change and affecting the lower class workers such as farmers in their everyday life. Lack of climate change information along with overprice land cost and government irresponsibility towards climate change adaptation continues to constrain farmers in Nigeria. A country supported by agricultural would take more action in order to combat climate change. Its economic value would be too high not to put more effort into fighting climate change. Since it's not a priority for the wealthier class in Nigeria, lower-class people directly suffer the effects of climate change in Nigeria more.

Nigeria along with the rest of Africa is in danger of being affected by climate change the most. According to the research of author Ignatius A. Madu, the IPCC has declared Africa a high vulnerable area based on its high exposure, and lack of adaptability to global climate change. It will affect the economy as well as social system in Africa if it is not addressed the way it should be. A country with so many natural resources such as Africa will lose those resources over time and will be affected harder than most regions of the world if climate change is not addressed with urgency.

Lower class workers feel the effects differently region to region of climate change but the effects in some of these countries are not as devastating due to better daptation methods than others in different countries and regions. Located in South Asia is the country Sri Lanka that struggles with global climate change, but is doing more to combat it than others. The country Sri Lanka has now started to investigate farm level adaptation to climate change by observing smaller farming communities in Sri Lanka. These farmers use their personal experiences and gained knowledge to fight global climate change. They have emphasized managing non-climatic elements which they have no control over and this has helped them adapt faster than most farming communities to climate change. Climate change has caused these farmers efficiency to increase. This increase gives them a greater chance of not being effected by climate change too much. It also shows how social networks can affect adaptation efforts. When more people take an issue seriously the response will be greater. Sri Lanka depends on agriculture goods to keep their economy stable and many people depend on it. adaptation efforts in Sri Lanka shows how the response from society can dictate the level of importance that people see in an issue.

Understanding of the way people process information is just as important as knowing the information needed to combat socio-economic, cognitive and normative aspects with in communities. Unlike Nigeria, studies have been run and tested by the Sri Lanka government on how to adapt to climate change which is helping them not be completely defenseless against global climate change. Countries like Sri Lanka who have a government who depend on agricultural exports to sustain part of the government sure completely different response to combating climate change unlike places like Nigeria. When the issue affects those of the top, adaptation will happen with the urgency. This will cause approaches the climate change to look different until we are all affected equally. Adaptation efforts have to be collective or we will not fix the worldwide problem or climate change in poverty.

== Proposed policy challenges ==
The main difficulties involved with climate change policy are the timetable of return on investment and the disparate costs on countries. To control the price of carbon, richer countries would have to make large loans to poorer countries, with the potential return on investment taking generations.

== Bibliography ==
- Delaney and Elizabeth Shrader (2000) Gender and Post-Disaster Reconstruction: The Case of Hurricane Mitch in Honduras and Nicaragua, LCSPG/LAC Gender Team, The World Bank, Decision Review Draft, page 24
- Esham, M., & Garforth, C. (2013). Agricultural adaptation to climate change: insights from a farming community in Sri Lanka. Mitigation and adaptation strategies for global change, 18(5), 535–549.
- IPCC. 2001. Impacts, Adaptation and Vulnerability, Contribution of Working Group II of the Intergovernmental Panel on Climate Change to the Third Assessment Report of the IPCC. Online at www.ipcc.ch (Accessed October 23, 2010)
- IPCC. 2007. Intergovernmental Panel on Climate Change Special Report on Emissions Scenarios (Accessed on November 2, 2010).
- IPCC (2007). "Summary for Policymakers" (PDF). Climate Change 2007: Mitigation. Contribution of Working Group III to the Fourth Assessment Report of the Intergovernmental Panel on Climate Change. pp. 1–23.
- IDS Bulletin. Poverty in a Changing Climate IDS Bulletin 39(4):2, September 2008
- Jabeen, Huraera and Fuad H. Mallick. Urban Poverty, climate change and built environment. The Daily Star. January 24, 2009.
- La Trobe, S. 2002. Climate Change and Poverty. (Accessed October 23, 2010)
- Liotta, Peter. "Climate Change and Human Security: The Use of Scenarios" Paper presented at the annual meeting of the International Studies Association, Town & Country Resort and Convention Center, San Diego, California, USA, Mar 22, 2006. 2009-05-25 <>
- Madu, I. A., & Nwankwo, C. F. (2021). Spatial pattern of climate change and farmer–herder conflict vulnerabilities in Nigeria. GeoJournal, 86(6), 2691–2707.
- Marger (2008). Examples of these disadvantages working in a circular process would be: economic decline, low personal income, no funds for school, which leads to lack of education. The lack of education results in unemployment and lastly low national productivity. ‘‘Social Inequality: Patterns and Processes.’’ McGraw Hill publishing. 4th edition. ISBN 0-07-352815-3
- Mohammed, A., Hassan, H., & Zakari, M. (2021). Impact of Sustainable Development Goals (SDGS) on Poverty Alleviation among Rural Women and Youth in Federal Capital Territory Abuja, Nigeria. KIU Journal Of Humanities, 6(1), 109-122. Retrieved from
- Molina, M.; Zaelke, D.; Sarmac, K. M.; Andersen, S. O.; Ramanathane, V.; Kaniaruf, D. (2009). "Tipping Elements in Earth Systems Special Feature: Reducing abrupt climate change risk using the Montreal Protocol and other regulatory actions to complement cuts in CO2 emissions". Proceedings of the National Academy of Sciences. 106 (49): 20616–21. Bibcode:2009PNAS..10620616M. doi:10.1073/pnas.0902568106. PMC 2791591. PMID 19822751.
- Miller, Kathleen. 1997. Climate Variability, Climate Change and Western Water. Report to the Western Water Policy Review Advisory Commission, NTIS, Springfield, VA. https://web.archive.org/web/20151031172136/http://www.isse.ucar.edu/water_climate/impacts.html (Accessed on November 2, 2010).
- O’Leary, Maureen. March 21, 2008. Climate Change on Infrastructure. http://scitizen.com/climate-change/climate-change-on-infrastructure_a-13-1788.html (Accessed on November 2, 2010).
- Olivier, J.G.J.; Peters, J.A.H.W. (2020). "Trends in global CO_{2} and total greenhouse gas emissions (2020)" (PDF). The Hague: PBL Netherlands Environmental Assessment Agency.
- Ozor, N., Madukwe, M. C., Enete, A. A., Amaechina, E. C., & Onokala, P. (2010). Barriers to climate change adaptation among farming households of Southern Nigeria. Journal of Agricultural Extension, 14(1).
- Ram, M.; Bogdanov, D.; Aghahosseini, A.; Gulagi, A. (2019). Global Energy System based on 100% Renewable Energy – Power, Heat, Transport and Desalination Sectors (PDF). Lappeenranta University of Technology / Energy Watch Group. ISBN 978-9523353398. ISSN 2243-3376. Archived from the original (PDF) on 2021-04-01.
- Rayner, S.; Malone, E.L. (2001). "Climate Change, Poverty, and Intragernerational Equity: The National Level". International Journal of Global Environmental Issues. 1 (2): 175–202. doi:10.1504/ijgenvi.2001.000977.
- Sample, Ian. "Warming hits ‘tipping point’" The Guardian. August 11, 2005. (Accessed on November 12, 2010).
- Schneider, S.H. et al. (2007). "Assessing key vulnerabilities and the risk from climate change. In: Climate Change 2007: Impacts, Adaptation and Vulnerability. Contribution of Working Group II to the Fourth Assessment Report of the Intergovernmental Panel on Climate Change [M.L. Parry et al. (eds.)"]. Cambridge University Press, Cambridge, U.K., and New York, N.Y., U.S.A.. pp. 779–810. Retrieved 2009-05-20.
- Simon, David. (2007), "Cities and Global Environmental Change: Exploring the Links," The Geographical Journal 173, 1 (March): 75–79 & see chapters 3 & 4 of Sir Nicholas Stern et al. (2007) Stern Review on the Economics of Climate Change. London: UK, Department of the Treasury.
- Smit, B.; Burton, I.; Klein, R.J.T.; Street, R. (1999). "The Science of Adaption: A framework for Assessment". Mitigation and Adaptation Strategies for Global Change. 4 (3/4): 199–213. Bibcode:1999MASGC...4..199S. doi:10.1023/A:1009652531101. S2CID 17970320.
- United Nations Development Programme. Human Development Report 2007/2008: The 21st Century Climate Challenge. United Nations Development Programme. (Accessed October 23, 2010).
- United Nations Development Programme. 1998. "Unequal Human Impacts of Environmental Damage," in Human Development Report 1998. Oxford and New York: Oxford University Press.
- United Nations Development Programme. 2006. "Human Development Report: Beyond Scarcity: Power, Poverty, and the Global Water Crisis." New York: Palgrave Macmillan, 2006. (pp. 25–199).
- UNICEF. 2007. Climate Change and Children. New York: United Nations Children's Fund.
- Progress in Drinking-water and Sanitation: special focus on sanitation. WHO/UNICEF Joint Monitoring Programme for Water Supply and Sanitation. July 17, 2008. p. 25..
- Updated Numbers: WHO/UNICEF Joint Monitoring Programme for Water Supply and Sanitation Updated Report. 2008. http://www.unicef.org/media/media_44093.html
- http://www.ied.ethz.ch/pub/pdf/IED_WP01_Schubert.pdf
- http://www-wds.worldbank.org/servlet/WDSContentServer/WDSP/IB/2010/11/02/000158349_20101102135244/Rendered/PDF/WPS5468.pdf
- World Health Organization. 2004. The Global Burden Disease: 2004 Update.
- CRC Press. 2018. "Poverty and Climate Change." https://library.oapen.org/handle/20.500.12657/43910.
