= Disability and disasters =

Impact of disasters on disabled people

Natural and manmade disasters tend to have a disproportionate impact on people with disabilities. This issue is recognized and addressed by Article 11 of the United Nations Convention on the Rights of Persons with Disabilities (CRPD) which states:

"States Parties shall take, in accordance with their obligations under international law, including international humanitarian law and international human rights law, all necessary measures to ensure the protection and safety of persons with disabilities in situations of risk, including situations of armed conflict, humanitarian emergencies and the occurrence of natural disasters."

Individuals with disabilities are often overlooked during disaster as a result of prejudice and, sometimes, the lack of a visible manifestation of a disability. Depending on the disability, an individual with a disability may not be able to recognize that a disaster is occurring or that they are at risk. Other individuals, such as those with disabilities limiting their mobility, may have difficulty in evacuation situations where they need to go down stairs, run, or open doors.

== Research and future directions ==
There is limited research knowledge, but many anecdotal reports, on what happens when disasters impact people with disabilities. Environmental disasters disproportionately affect vulnerable populations, especially persons with disabilities. The World Report of People with Disabilities states that world disability prevalence is climbing; however, disaster relief and planning programs are still not tailoring their policies and efforts to assist this vulnerable population. Individuals with disabilities may be greatly affected by natural disasters and disregarded during disaster planning. Those with physical disabilities can be at risk when evacuating if assistance is not available. Individuals with cognitive impairments may struggle with understanding instructions that must be followed in the event a disaster occurs. Those who are blind, hearing impaired, etc. may have difficulty communicating during the emergency. People with sensory, mobility, and physical challenges are often disadvantaged during disaster evacuation and relief; however, those with mental, cognitive, or perceptual impairments are often even more overlooked due to the less obvious nature of their impairment. When a person with a disability's support network is disrupted by a disaster, they may require additional specific forms of shelter and evacuation. Disaster risk reduction is focused on those without impairment in mental and emotional stability, stamina and cognition, mobility, sight, hearing, and speech. Similarly, disaster risk reduction assumes that people with disabilities are dependent on a caregiver, disregarding instances in which the person may not have help readily available. Disaster relief and risk policies are tailored towards able-bodied people, despite the fact that 15% of the world's population is disabled, with prevalence continuing to increase. Prevalence is likely increasing because of a global increase in chronic health conditions, on top of the overall aging of the world population. In children specifically, 10% of this already vulnerable population is estimated to have a disability. Despite this high percentage, children with disabilities are often excluded from disaster risk reduction initiatives, rendering them more susceptible to educational, physical, and psychological vulnerabilities. Children with disabilities require additional physical and educational support, which risk reduction policies often fail to consider. Especially in the poorest countries around the world, people with disabilities are less likely to receive the same attention as more privileged individuals during these circumstances. All of these factors can increase the degree of variation of risk in disaster situations with disabled individuals.

== Discrimination ==
Disasters exacerbate the discrimation faced by individuals with disabilities. Some research studies have found discrimination against individuals with disabilities during all phases of the disaster cycle. The most common limitation is that people cannot physically access buildings or transport, as well as access disaster-related services. The exclusion of these individuals is caused in part by the lack of disability-related training provided to emergency planners and disaster relief personnel. All persons with disabilities experience an exponential disadvantage regarding environmental disaster, and those with intellectual disabilities are just as affected as those with physical impairments, even though they are often considered less. People with such invisible illnesses do not receive the cognitive support that they need to cope with disaster until their needs become visibly apparent to others, which often never ends up happening. Those with cognitive or intellectual disabilities tend to display an unawareness of social and practical risk, putting them at a higher chance of experiencing negative outcomes from a catastrophe. When visual assessments in disaster shelters are conducted, disaster workers are often unable to identify and respond to their needs because they simply cannot tell that they require additional cognitive support. Not only do policies regarding disaster discriminate against people with disabilities, but catastrophic events within the environment also tend to increase disability incidence and exacerbate medical conditions.

== Disability in disaster management planning ==
Disability as a factor in disaster planning is an issue that is receiving attention from some disaster management jurisdictions while various disability rights organizations are active in lobbying and education efforts for authorities to include the needs of disabled members of the public in their planning. The CRPD has influenced initiatives like The Sphere Project to include more disability related guidelines and recognise the different approaches required for different disabilities. In rural and lower income countries and areas, there is a gap between those who need financial and human resources and those who get it, thus those with disability do not receive the services that they need.
