= Green exercise =

Physical exercise undertaken in natural environments

Green exercise refers to physical exercise undertaken in natural environments. Physical exercise is well known to provide physical and psychological health benefits. There is also good evidence that viewing, being in, and interacting with natural environments has positive effects, reducing stress and increasing the ability to cope with stress, reducing mental fatigue and improving concentration and cognitive function. The concept of green exercise has therefore grown out of well-established areas such as the attention restoration theory within environmental psychology which have tended to focus on the psychological and physical effects of viewing nature (e.g., see the work of Kaplan and Ulrich) and well-recognised work about the psychological benefits of physical exercise.

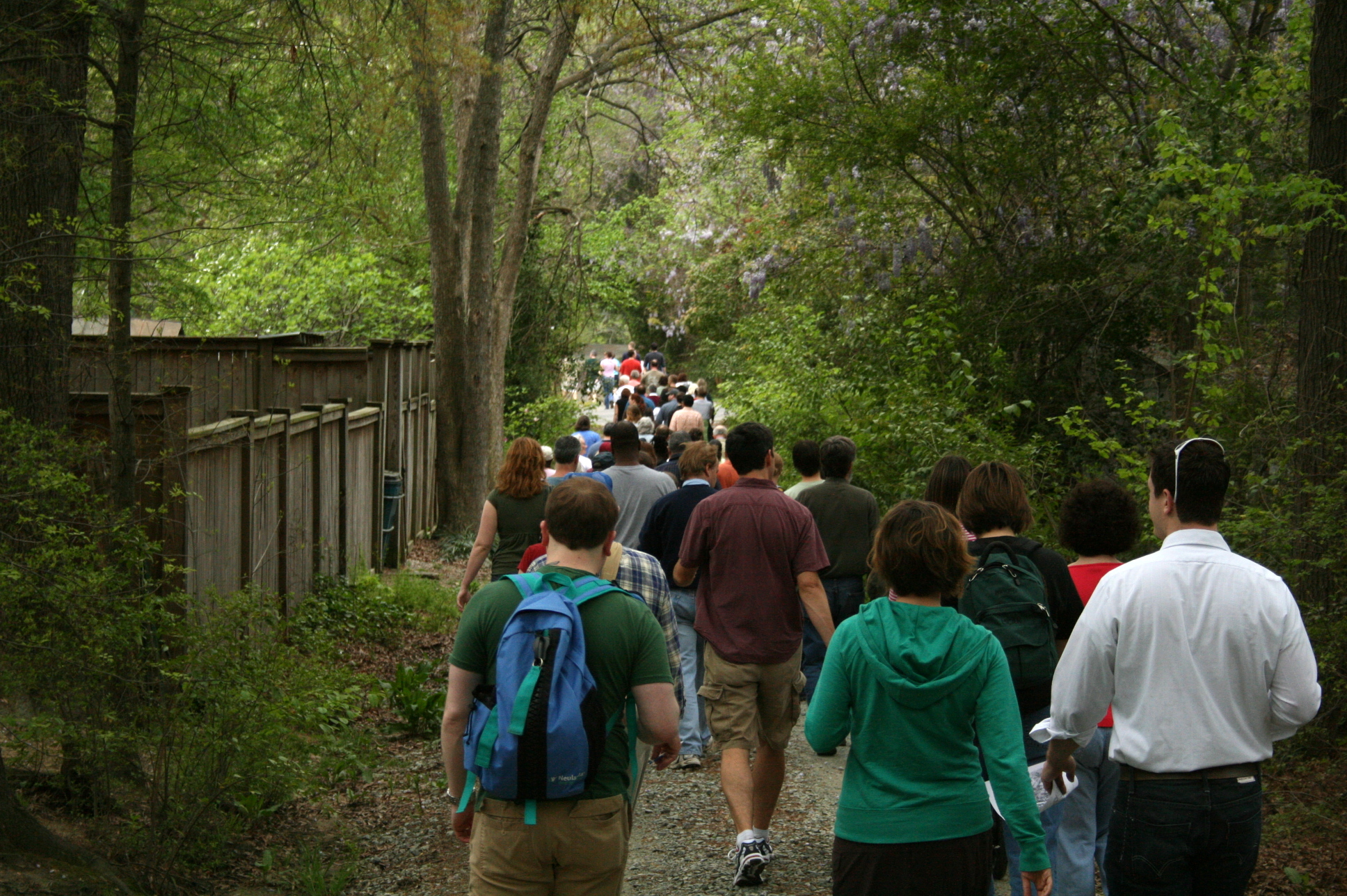
Green exercise refers to physical exercise which takes place in relatively natural places.

The potential role of green exercise in physical and mental health (e.g., due to nature-deficit disorder) attracted increasing attention from the early twenty-first century, particularly through the research work of Jules Pretty and Jo Barton at the University of Essex. and several funded programs (see examples). Research has involved participants from many different cohorts including adults, young people and vulnerable groups such as those with mental illness (see research).

== Theory ==
Green exercise can be usefully considered from a number of theoretical perspectives including:

- Exercise psychology
- Biophilia and evolutionary psychology
- Environmental psychology theories, such as attention restoration theory

== Research ==
Adults

Research examining the impact of green exercise in adults has demonstrated significant benefits for self-esteem and mood. The largest study of green exercise in adults involved meta-analytic methodologies to analyse the results of 10 studies based on 1252 green exercise participants. Results indicated that "the overall effect size for improved self-esteem was d = 0.46 (CI 0.34−0.59, p < 0.00001) and for mood d = 0.54 (CI 0.38−0.69, p < 0.00001). Dose responses for both intensity and duration showed large benefits from short engagements in green exercise, and then diminishing but still positive returns. The study also revealed that all types of green environment improved self-esteem and mood, however the greatest improvements were experienced from environments where water was present. Similarly all cohorts of participants experienced improvements in self-esteem and mood, however those suffering from mental illness experienced the greatest increases in self-esteem.

Vulnerable groups

The outcomes of the meta-analysis by Barton and Pretty indicated that green exercise may have therapeutic applications. This has led to the idea of Green Care. Green Care comprises all types of therapeutic green exercise activities including social and therapeutic horticulture, animal assisted interventions, ecotherapy, facilitated green exercise, wilderness therapy and care farming. There has been extensive research into the benefits of these green care interventions. Care farming in particular has been demonstrated to improve self-esteem and mood in those suffering from a variety of mental illnesses, whilst wilderness therapy has been demonstrated to improve self-esteem and psychological health outcomes in youth at risk.

Children

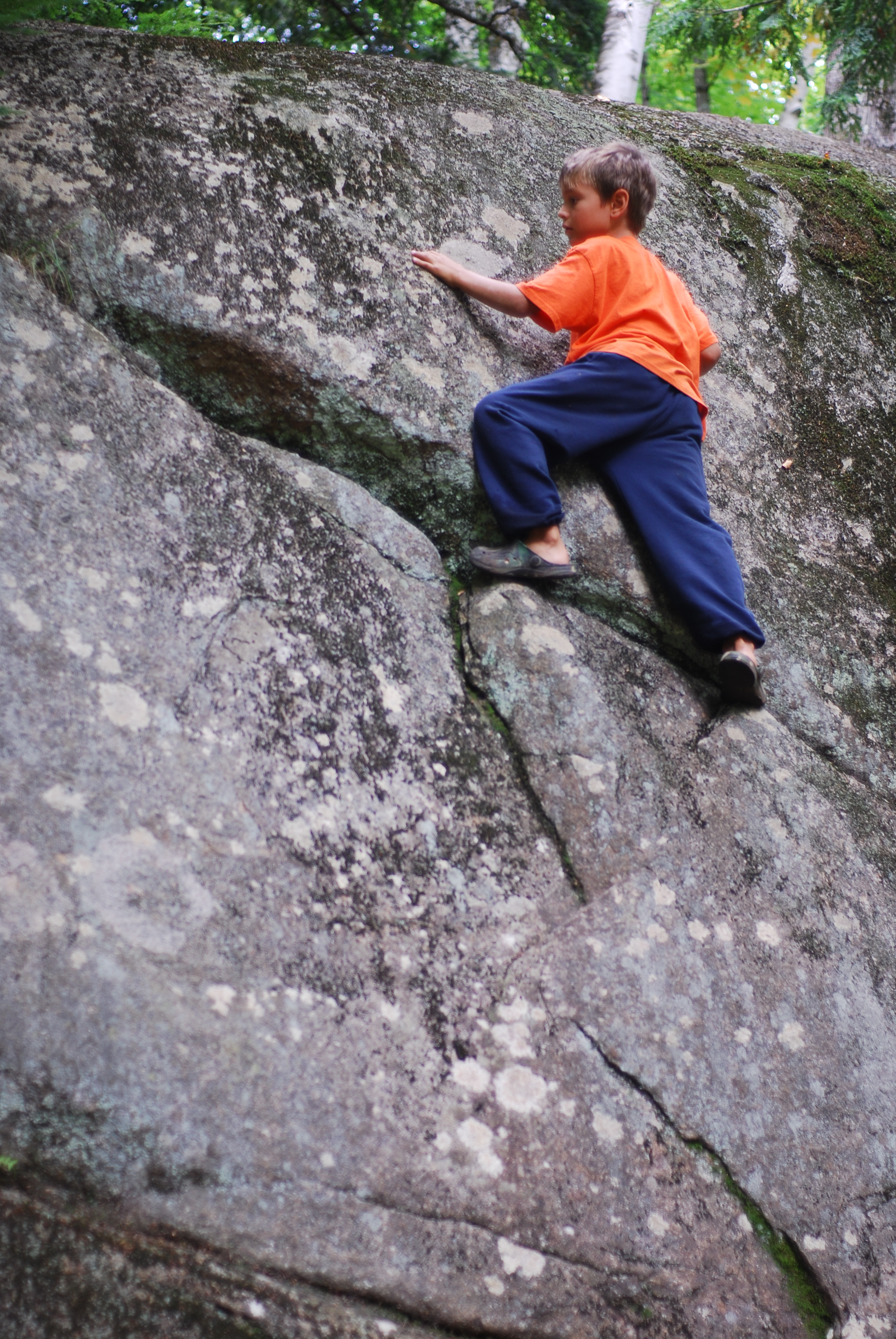

In comparison to research in adults, research in children and young people has indicated that there is no additional benefit of taking part in green exercise for self-esteem or mood. These findings can be related to nature deficit disorder whereby children are spending less time outdoors interacting with natural environments. To receive benefits from having contact with nature an individual needs to be connected and feel some emotion towards it, thus it is possible that children are not benefiting from green exercise in the same way as adults because they are not connected to the natural environment in the same way that adults are.

== Examples ==
Instances of green exercise are numerous and diverse. Some examples include:

1. Natural England is funding eight demonstration green exercise projects through local regional partnerships. The main aim is to increase levels of physical activity and people's connections to their local green spaces.
2. Green Exercise Partnership between NHS Health Scotland, FCS and Scottish Natural Heritage (SNH). In partnership with SNH and NHS Health Scotland, the Scottish Government is providing £3 million funding to the Paths for All Partnership between 2007 and 2010 to develop its Paths to Health Initiative, which currently supports over 20,000 people to take part in health walks each week. SNH and Government funding is also being provided to BTCV to extend their green gym project.
3. Green Gym programs are a type of green exercise. These generally involve organised groups which engage in volunteer environmental restoration work, but which are also specifically designed to provide physical exercise and physical conditioning in the context of experiencing natural environments. An example of such a green gym program are those conducted through the Australian Conservation Foundation which are based on similar programs conducted by the British Trust for Conservation Volunteers.
4. Barefoot running is an example of a type of physical exercise (running) which is conducted so as to include a greater degree of contact with the surrounding environment (by going barefoot).
5. Walk and Talk groups meet regularly for walks in green routes through the countryside, towns and cities following Psychology in the Real World principles as elucidated by Guy Holmes, mental health service user activist Nicki Evans and others.

== See also ==
- Care farming
- Cyclability
- Cycling advocacy
- Cycling infrastructure
- Ecopsychology
- Environmental health
- Environmental justice
- Forest bathing
- Green prescription
- Greenway (landscape)
- Healing environments
- Horticultural therapy
- Nature exposure and mental health
- Nature therapy
- Right to a healthy environment
- Therapeutic garden
- Urban forest inequity
- Urban forest
- Urban forestry
- Urban green space
- Walkability
- Walking audit
