= Biodiversity hypothesis of health =

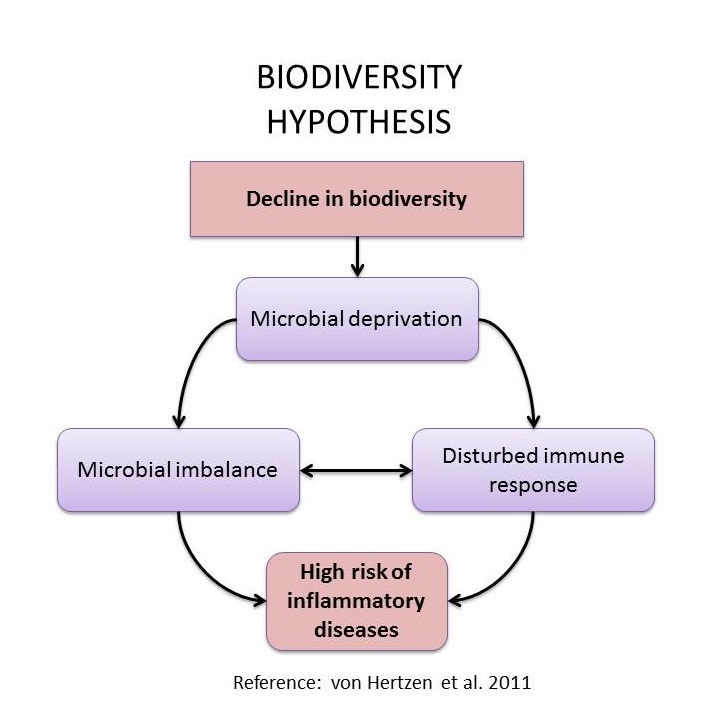
Diagram of biodiversity hypothesis

According to the biodiversity hypothesis, reduced contact of people with natural environment and biodiversity may adversely affect the human commensal microbiota and its immunomodulatory capacity. The hypothesis is based on the observation that two dominant socio-ecological trends – the loss of biodiversity and increasing incidence of inflammatory diseases – are interconnected.

Urbanization and fragmentation of habitats increasingly lead to loss of connection between human and natural environment. Furthermore, immunological non-communicable diseases have become increasingly common in recent decades especially in urbanized communities.

== The microbes of natural environment influence human health ==
Many immunological inflammatory diseases, such as allergies, diabetes and inflammatory bowel diseases, have become increasingly common in countries of high standard of living and high level of hygiene. One reason is presumably that along with degradation and fragmentation of habitats and urbanization, people encounter less microbes of natural environment. Here, microbes of natural environment are referred to as all microbes, especially those that are not pathogens nor parasites (parasites still play an essential role in regulation of immune response).

According to the core message of the biodiversity hypothesis, it is essential to the development of our immune system that we are sufficiently exposed to diverse natural environments and especially to the microbes in them. The microbes in our surroundings influence our own microbiota which is further connected to our immune system. Furthermore, immunological disorders are the main cause of inflammatory diseases. In a sense, microbes train developing immune system to identify actual threats from harmless allergens, but there is not yet full consensus of the mechanism. During biological evolution, we have in a way outsourced many of the functions of our body to our microbiota. Microbiota trains immune system throughout the life: organs constantly process invasive particles and proteins. Functional immune system discriminates threatening particles from the harmless ones and products of one's own cells from foreign ones. Present populations of cities evidently have marks of chronic inflammation as a result of weakening immune defence.

== Prevention of inflammatory diseases and maintenance of health ==
Mild inflammation and immunological imbalance are characteristic to a group of chronic non-communicable diseases and disorders that threaten public health. These include asthma, allergies, diabetes, inflammatory bowel diseases, metabolic syndrome, cardiovascular diseases, cancer, neurological diseases and mental disorders. Prevention of many of these diseases have been improved by affecting known risk factors, but they explain only a fraction of chronic diseases and have not revealed the bottom reasons of increasing incidence of allergies.

When health benefits that are based on diverse nature are taken seriously, cost savings may be major. For example, in Finland in year 2011, total costs of asthma and allergies for the society were 1,3—1,6 billion euros. The direct costs of allergic diseases, including disability to work, have decreased by 15% in the 2000s as a result of shift in Finnish national allergy programme. In the programme, the focus was shifted from curing the symptoms to prevention, for example by emphasizing connection to natural environment.

Practical recommendations to obtain and maintain tolerance
Support breastfeeding, solid foods from the age of 4–6 months.
Do not avoid environmental exposure unnecessarily.
Strengthen immunity by increasing connection to natural environment.
Use antibiotics with thought. Vast majority of microbes are useful and support health.
Probiotic bacteria in fermented food or other preparations may strengthen immunity.

== Exposure to microbes ==
We are exposed to microbes in different ways, from which are respiratory tract, digestive system and skin contact. The habitat we live in and the food we eat greatly influence our microbiota. Our own way of living and our choices, how we live, eat, move and what are our recreational activities, impacts on the amount of valuable microbe exposure. The amount, as well as the microbial diversity of exposure, are essential factors.

For example, youth living in Northern Karelia (Finns) and those living in Russian Karelia (Russians) have significantly different skin and nose microbiotas. At the same time, the differences in inflammatory diseases are significant: only one third of Russian youth have allergies compared to Finnish youth. Similar differences in the incidence of allergies have been observed between Finnish children living in differing, urban or rural environments.

== Risks ==
Traditionally, natural environment have been seen from the viewpoint of management of the threats it causes. The incidence of several infectious diseases have indeed decreased because of improved level of hygiene. Formerly, recommended treatment to allergies was to avoid exposure as now it is known that exposure is essential to develop immune system. While increasing healthy exposure to microbes it is essential for achieving the benefits to acknowledge and reduce the risk of being exposed to [pathogens].

== Microbial exposure of future mothers and children ==
A baby is exposed to mother's microbes during pregnancy, birth and breastfeeding. The nutrition and way of life of expecting mother as well as chosen ways of giving birth and feeding have remarkable effect on the development of the baby's immune system. Even small choices can have major impact on individual health. Vaginal birth and breastfeeding are influential ways to increase the exposure of baby to mother's microbes and therefore further the development of immune system.

Immune system continues to develop throughout childhood and therefore regular microbial exposure is essential for children. Lack of forests and fields near home is connected to unbalanced skin microbiota of children and youth. Kindergartens and schools are functional places to increase microbial exposure as they encompass whole age groups at its best. From public health point of view, it would be functional to focus on sufficient microbial exposure in kindergartens and schools, in which case the exposure does not rely on families' way of life.

Anyhow, microbiotas of human body change throughout life and therefore all age groups benefit from being exposed to the microbes of natural environment. One's own way of life and choices related to housing, nutrition and movement are in an essential role in that exposure. Immune system can be strengthened throughout life with increased and diverse contact with nature. Immune system function weakens with age and therefore regular contact to natural environment is important to elders too.

== Urban planning ==
Urbanisation is a global trend. While urban structure is condensing, it is important to conserve urban nature. From a viewpoint of biodiversity hypothesis, urban planning should take into account both holistic health and wellbeing benefits of nature and possibilities of citizens to be exposed to biodiverse natural environments and microbes. Functionally, exposure takes place near home and daily routes. In city center there is usually less forests than outskirts, but parks and different built natural elements can be exploited also in highly constructed areas.

In terms of nature contact of children and the elderly, the quality of the near environment is particularly important, as the mobility circle is more limited than the working age population. Functional natural elements in yards of kindergartens, schools, sheltered homes and retirement homes could be e.g. cultivation boxes, fruit trees, berry bushes, green roofs and walls and gardens. Forests and parks must be located close for being easy to use in everyday life, during lessons and walks. Deadwood can be left to forests and parks to promote biodiversity and inspire movement. Self-sufficient mobility of the elderly is supported by sufficient density of benches. Planning of healthy habitats requires cooperation between sectors — at least zoning, recreation and exercise, management of green and blue infrastructure, construction, environment, health care, and education.

== Needs for further understanding ==
It is not yet clear, what amount of exposure is needed, how the microbes of environment precisely get in system and what are relations between different microbes. Is visiting natural environments occasionally enough or should we be exposed to the microbes of natural environment in our everyday life?

Anyhow, it is evident that we get multiple health and wellbeing benefits from nature. Despite there remains several open questions related to the biodiversity hypothesis, it has been proposed that we should still take it into account in urban and regional planning and build healthy and biodiverse cities.

== See also ==
- Biophilia hypothesis
- Nature Based Solutions
- Nature deficit disorder
- Nature prescription
- Nature therapy
