= Children & Nature Network =

No Child Left Inside Advocacy

The Children & Nature Network was founded in 2006 by a group of educators, writers, and community leaders who share a deep concern about children's disconnection from nature. The Children & Nature Network was created to encourage and support the people and organizations working to reconnect children with nature. The organization provides access to the latest news and research in the field and a peer-to-peer network of researchers and individuals, educators and organizations dedicated to children's health and well-being.

The Children & Nature Network news service offers parents, youth, civic leaders, educators and health-care providers access to the latest news and research in this field as well as practical advice, including ways to apply new-found knowledge at home, at school, in work environments, and in the community. The network also engages a diverse community of institutes, organizations and industries by providing a forum for publishing and presenting research, reports and case studies on children's health and nature, and related program-development strategies and support. The Children & Nature Network has compiled research studies to help understand what is best for children's healthy development.

In addition to Richard Louv's book, Last Child in the Woods, other books written by the Children & Nature Network board of directors include Coming Home: Community, Creativity and Consciousness by Cheryl Charles, Toddlers, and Families: A Framework for Support and Intervention by Marti Erickson, and Children and Nature: Psychological, Sociocultural, and Evolutionary Investigations by Stephen Kellert. Marti Erickson hosts the Mom Enough podcast.

== Mission ==
The mission of the Children & Nature Network is to give every child in every community a wide range of opportunities to experience nature directly, reconnecting children with nature's joys and lessons, its profound physical and mental bounty.

== Co-founders ==
Board members include published authors, educators, entrepreneurs, researchers, academics, youth leaders, and business and organizational leaders.

- Marti Erickson, PhD
- Richard Louv
- Cheryl Charles, PhD
- Martin LeBlanc
- Amy Pertschuk
- Michael Pertschuk

The co-founders of the Children & Nature Network bring a substantial set of accomplishments as recipients of awards and recognition for their research, leadership, journalism, educational program development and entrepreneurship.

== Leadership teams ==
Leadership Team
Position	Member
Executive Director	Sarah Milligan Toffler
Consulting Research Director	Cathy Jordan
Director, Strategic Initiatives	Margaret Lamar
Director, Leadership Development & Natural Leaders Network	Juan Martinez
Director, Marketing and Communications	Laura Mylan

Board of Directors
Position	Member
Board Chair	Stephan D. Nygren
Vice Chair	Lisa Moore
Past Chair	Fran P. Mainella
Treasurer	David Hartwell
Secretary	Mohammed Lawal
Chair Emeritus	Richard Louv

== Nature-deficit disorder ==
The term "nature-deficit disorder" was coined by author Richard Louv in his book Last Child in the Woods to describe what happens to children who become disconnected from their natural world. Louv associates this separation from nature to some of the most disturbing childhood trends, such as the rises in obesity, attention disorders, and depression. Research indicates that getting children outdoors helps reduce attention disorders.
