= Right to a healthy environment =

Human right proposed by environmental groups

The right to a healthy environment or the right to a clean, healthy and sustainable environment is a human right necessary for the full enjoyment of a wide range of human rights, such as the rights to life, health, food, water and sanitation and development, among others. Additionally, the enjoyment of all human rights, including the rights to information, participation and access to justice, is of paramount importance to the protection of the environment. All people have the right to a clean, healthy and sustainable environment.

A key development in the emerging recognition of this right was the acknowledgement by the United Nations Human Rights Council during its 48th session on 18 October 2021 in HRC/RES/48/13 and subsequently by the United Nations General Assembly on July 28, 2022 in A/RES/76/300. The Resolution from the United Nations General Assembly can be considered as a powerful recognition of widespread, worldwide support of this right. Currently, 165 countries recognize the right either through their constitutions, legislations, and/or through the ratification of international and regional treaties.

The right to a healthy environment uses a human rights approach to protect environmental quality; this approach addresses the impact of environmental harm upon individual humans, as opposed to the more traditional approach of environmental regulation which focuses on impacts to other states or the environment itself. Yet another approach to environmental protection is rights of nature which tries to extend the rights enjoyed by humans and corporations to nature as well. The right includes both substantive and procedural elements.

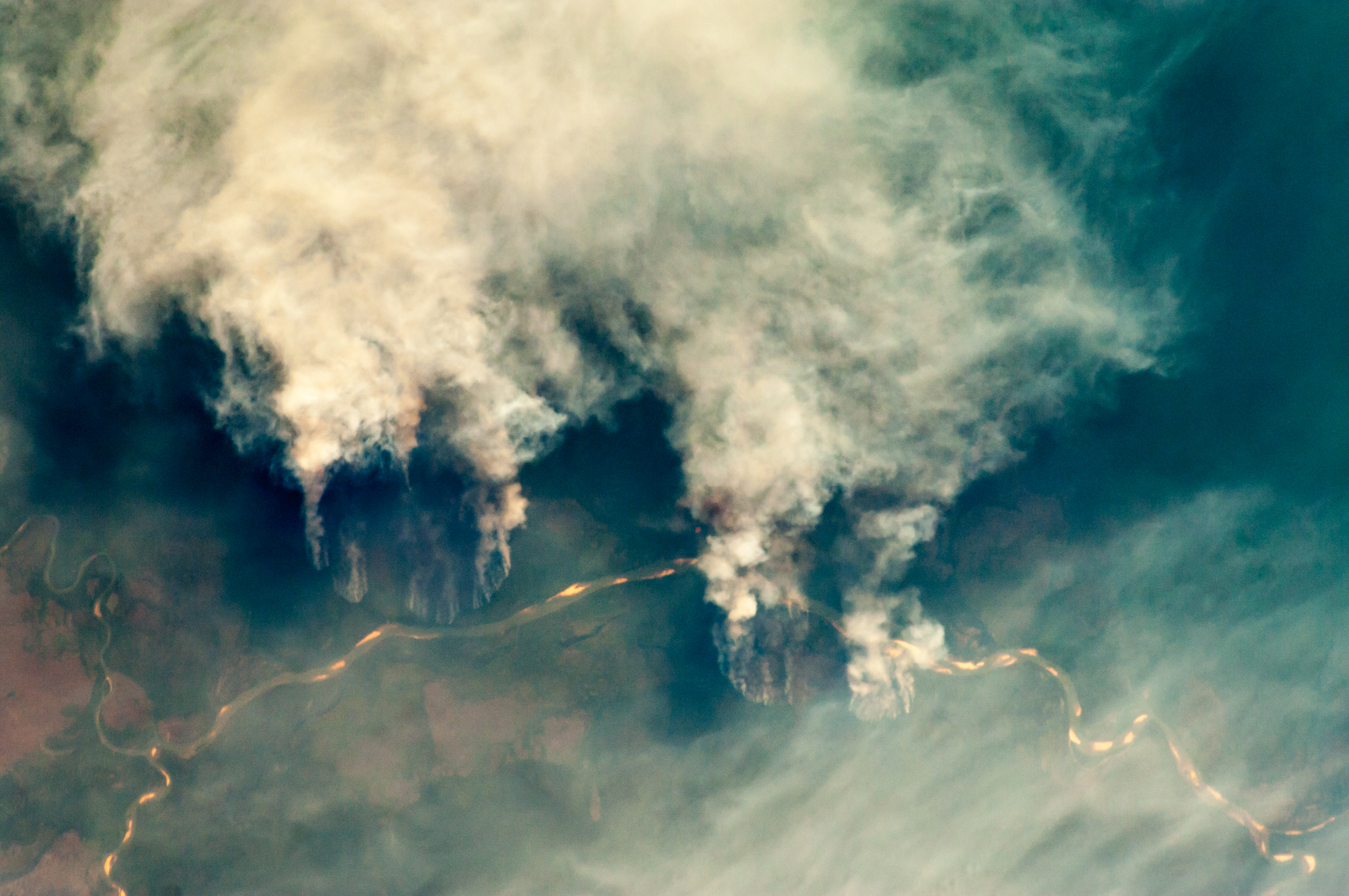
Slash and burn deforestation along the Rio Xingu, Brazil endangers both indigenous rights to the land as well as the larger right to a healthy environment. Case law like the Colombian Climate case protecting the Amazon forest from deforestation have historically relied on the rights of nature and children, the right to a healthy environment would provide additional protection.

== Role of the state ==
The right creates an obligation of the state to regulate and enforce environmental laws, control pollution, and otherwise provide justice and protections for communities harmed by environmental problems. The right to a healthy environment has been an important right for creating environmental legal precedents for climate change litigation and other environmental issues.

=== Attempts to amend constitutions ===
An environmental rights amendment is type of amendment usually proposed to a constitution or a bill of rights. It seeks to outline and protect the environmental rights of people, such as clean water, clean air, and a stable climate.

The term is often used synonymously with the term “Green Amendment,” although Green Amendments were defined by the educational advocacy organization Green Amendments for the Generations and its founder Maya van Rossum who coined the term.

Environmental Rights Amendments and Green Amendments seek to guarantee people the right to a healthy environment. Related rights included in these proposals often include a right to a stable climate, clean air and water, environmental justice, preservation of natural, scenic, esthetic and historic values of the environment.

The right to a healthy environment can be implemented into constitutional law other ways, such as written into constitutions in their drafting, such as in Tunisia, or enforced through climate change litigation, such as in Colombia. In the United States, most advocates are focused on amending existing state constitutions or enforcing existing state constitutions, such as in Held v. Montana, where youth won a trial court judgment for enforcement the existing state constitution.

== Role of Corporations ==
In addition to states obligations, corporations and businesses also have a responsibility to respect human rights, including the right to a clean, healthy and sustainable environment. The UN Guiding Principles on Business and Human Rights articulates that business and enterprises should respect the right to a clean, healthy and sustainable environment and seek to proactively advance it through responsible business practices.

The responsibility to respect human rights requires business enterprises: (a) Avoid causing or contributing to adverse human rights impacts through their own activities, and address such impacts when they occur; (b) Seek to prevent or mitigate adverse human rights impacts that are directly link to their operation, products or services by their business relationship, even if they have not contributed to those impacts.

== Environmental Human Rights Defenders (EHRDs) ==
Environmental Human Rights Defenders can be seen as "individuals and groups who, in their personal or professional capacity and in a peaceful manner, strive to protect and promote human rights relating to the environment, including water, air, land, flora, and fauna."

EHRDs remain highly vulnerable and under attack across the globe. Worldwide, EHRDs face growing assault and murders in conjunction with increasing intimidation, harassment, stigmatization, and criminalization. In 2025, 124 EHRDs were murdered for speaking out or taking action to defend their right to a clean, healthy and sustainable environment.

== International approaches ==
Global warming—the progression from cooler historical temperatures (blue) to recent warmer temperatures (red)—is being experienced disproportionately by younger generations.

Successive generations are predicted to experience progressively greater unprecedented lifetime exposure (ULE) events such as heat waves. About 111 million children born in 2020 will live with unprecedented heatwave exposure in a world that warms by 3.5 °C, compared with 62 million with only 1.5 °C of warming.

Historically, major United Nations' human rights instruments, like the Universal Declaration on Human Rights, the International Covenant on Civil and Political Rights or International Covenant on Economic, Social and Cultural Rights do not recognize the right to a healthy environment. The 1972 Stockholm Declaration on Human Environment recognizes the right in its first principle: "the fundamental right to freedom, equality and adequate conditions of life, in an environment of a quality that permits a life of dignity and well-being", but is not a legally binding document. The 1992 Rio Declaration does not use the language of human rights, although it does state that individuals shall have access to information regarding environmental matters, participation in decision-making, and access to justice. The currently proposed UN resolution, the Global Pact for the Environment, if adopted, would be the first UN human rights instrument to include the right to a healthy environment.

Over 150 states in the UN have independently recognized the right in some form via legislation, litigation, constitutional law, treaty law or other legal authority. The African Charter on Human and Peoples' Rights, American Convention on Human Rights, Escazu Agreement, Arab Charter on Human Rights, and ASEAN Declaration on Human Rights each include a right to a healthy environment. Other human rights frameworks, such as the Convention on the Rights of the Child refer to environmental issues as they relate to the framework's focus, in this case children's rights.

UN Special Rapporteurs on Human Rights and the Environment John H. Knox (2012–2018) and David R. Boyd (2018 -) have made recommendations on how to formalize these rights in international law. This was endorsed by a number of committees at the UN level, as well as local legal communities such as the New York City Bar, in 2020.

The right to a healthy environment is at the core of the international approach to human rights and climate change. The effects of climate change on human rights are presented by OHCHR in a fact sheet with the most frequently asked questions on the subject.

=== UN Human Rights Council Resolution ===
In 2021 during its 48th session, the United Nations Human Rights Council adopted a resolution (put forward by the core group comprising Costa Rica, Morocco, Slovenia, Switzerland and the Maldives, with Costa Rica being penholder), recognizing "The human right to a clean, healthy and sustainable environment", marking the first time that the body declared a human right. The resolution is not legally binding, but it "invites the United Nations General Assembly to consider the matter".

=== UN General Assembly Resolution ===
In 2022 during its 76th session, the United Nations General Assembly adopted a resolution put forward by a core group including Costa Rica, Morocco, Slovenia, Switzerland, and the Maldives once again recognizing the human right to a clean, healthy, and sustainable environment. The Resolution, which followed recognition of the right by the United Nations Human Rights Council in October 2021, was an unprecedented decision, adopted with wide support (161 votes in favor, no votes against, and eight abstentions. Although General Assembly resolutions are not legally binding, this resolution was welcomed by then-UN High Commissioner for Human Rights Michelle Bachelet, multiple special rapporteurs and members of some civil society organizations.

== See also ==
- Brain health and pollution
- Effects of climate change on human health
- Effects of climate change on mental health
- Environmental justice
- Green exercise
- Mental environment
- Nature exposure and mental health
- Urban forest inequity
- Third-generation human rights
