= Green Hour =

National Wildlife Federation-recommended parenting strategy

Green Hour is a core concept of the U.S. National Wildlife Federation's Be Out There campaign. The campaign was created in response to a growing disconnect between nature and children, a condition dubbed nature deficit disorder by Richard Louv in his book Last Child in the Woods. One of the primary symptoms of nature deficit disorder, according to Louv, is the replacement of outdoor activities (or "green time") with "screen time"—hours that are spent in front of computers, televisions and other electronic devices.

The National Wildlife Federation recommends that parents give their kids a "Green Hour" every day, a time for unstructured play and interaction with the natural world. This is part of NWF's strategy called Reversing Nature Deficit. The Green Hour program teaches that unstructured play can take place in a garden, a backyard, a nearby park, or any place that provides safe and accessible green spaces where children can learn and play.

Green Hour's web site was launched by NWF's Education department in March 2007 as a resource for parents and caregivers, attempting to provide the information, inspiration, tools and community needed to make "green hours" part of every family's daily routine. Green Hour cites a Kaiser Family Foundation study which found the average American child spends 44 hours per week-more than six hours per day-staring at some kind of electronic screen. Studies have also linked excessive television viewing to obesity, violence, and even lower intelligence in kids.

Each week, Green Hour publishes a new issue of its Discovery Journal with a new outdoor theme. The Journal has several tabs: "Book Nook," which provides reading for kids of different ages, "Make & Do," which provides outdoor activities and crafts and "Did You Know." which provides facts about nature.

The Green Hour blog presents different perspectives on the rise in children's "screen-time" and practical ways of reconnecting youth to nature. The Green Hour Community Corner allow users to sign up as members and talk with other parents and caregivers. NatureFind is a feature on the site that allows users to submit their zip code and find all the parks, trails and other natural areas nearby.

== See also ==
- Green World
