= Green care =

The term Green care may refer to:

- Care farming
- Horticultural therapy
- Services supporting individuals or organisations to become more environmentally friendly
- Services and products related to gardening
