= The Walking Podcast =

Podcast by Jon Mooallem

The Walking Podcast is a podcast by Jon Mooallem.

In January 2019, Mooallem announced on Twitter that he would be starting the podcast. Each episode is a one hour long recording of Mooallem hiking in the Pacific Northwest. The show's listenership increased during the COVID-19 pandemic and has released three seasons.

The show is largely ambient noise from Mooallem hiking, but does occasionally voices from his kids or friends who join him on the hike The show has similarities to forest bathing. The show has also been compared to ASMR. Mooallem does ad reads during the walk. On March 24, 2020 Mooallem was supposed to be doing a book tour, but COVID-19 changed his plans so he promoted the book on The Walking Podcast instead.

George Fenwick wrote in Stuff that listening to the show is "pure pleasure" and that the show helps release stress. Kevin Cortez wrote in The A.V. Club that the show was "pure meditative bliss".
