= Environmental rights amendment =

An environmental rights amendment is type of amendment usually proposed to a constitution or a bill of rights. It seeks to outline and protect the environmental rights of people, such as clean water, clean air, and a stable climate.

The term is often used synonymously with the term “Green Amendment,” although Green Amendments were defined by the educational advocacy organization Green Amendments for the Generations and its founder Maya van Rossum who coined the term.

Environmental Rights Amendments and Green Amendments seek to guarantee people the right to a healthy environment. Related rights included in these proposals often include a right to a stable climate, clean air and water, environmental justice, preservation of natural, scenic, esthetic and historic values of the environment.

The right to a healthy environment can be implemented into constitutional law other ways, such as written into constitutions in their drafting, such as in Tunisia, or enforced through climate change litigation, such as in Colombia. In the United States, most advocates are focused on amending existing state constitutions or enforcing existing state constitutions, such as in Held v. Montana, where youth won a trial court judgment for enforcement the existing state constitution.

== United States ==
States in green have a Green Amendment, which is an environmental rights amendment in the Bill of Rights section of a state constitution. States in yellow have Green Amendment legislation in process as of 2024. There are some states with environmental language in their constitutions that does not suit the definition of a Green Amendment.

In the United States, there is no federal environmental rights amendment. While environmental rights are mentioned in a number of state constitutions, the states of Montana, New York and Pennsylvania have passed environmental rights amendments.

=== Montana ===
Montana added environmental rights in 1972.

==== Litigation ====
Held v. Montana was a high profile constitutional law climate lawsuit, which went to trial on June 12, 2023. On August 14, 2023, the trial court judge ruled in the youth plaintiffs' favor, though the state indicated it would appeal the decision. Montana's Supreme Court heard oral arguments on July 10, 2024, its seven justices taking the case under advisement. Montana's Supreme Court affirmed, ruling in favor of the plaintiffs, holding that the Montana Environmental Policy Act (MEPA) limitation on reviewing greenhouse gas emissions was unconstitutional and violated the constitutional right to a clean and healthful environment.

=== New York ===
It was not until 2022 that New York state added a Green Amendment to its constitution. Article I section 19 of the New York Constitution provides, "Each person shall have a right to clean air and water, and a healthful environment." The effort to get the Green Amendment on the ballot started in 2017 and was successful in November 2021.

=== Pennsylvania ===
The state of Pennsylvania was the first to pass an environmental rights amendment as part of their state's bill of rights in 1971. Pennsylvania's environmental rights amendment was proposed by conservationist Ralph W. Abele about 1969 when he became executive secretary of the Joint Legislative Air and Water Pollution Control and Conservation Committee of the Pennsylvania House and Senate. In 1972 he became executive director of the Pennsylvania Fish Commission. During his entire career Mr. Abele was a strong voice for protecting the state's lakes, rivers and streams.

=== Proposed amendments ===
There are several ways to add an environmental rights amendment to a state constitutions in the United States. Although each state is slightly different, in general the state legislature has to pass legislation for the amendment, then it goes before the voters to decide if it will actually be added to the state constitution. A citizen petition can also get an amendment before the people, if the petition can get enough signatures from residents in the state, and go through some other steps, then it can be put before the voters. Citizens in Florida are attempting to do this as of March 2024.

The states of California, Connecticut, Hawaii, Iowa, Kentucky, New Jersey, New Mexico, Tennessee, Texas, Vermont, Washington, and West Virginia have drafted, or are drafting, legislation to add environmental rights amendments to their state constitutions. Other states may well be added to this list as time goes on. As of March 2024, nine states have legislation proposed that could potentially put it on the 2024 ballot. Hawaii, New Jersey, and Washington states have made the most progress toward this goal.

It is important for the wording of any environmental rights amendment to be specific and placed in the Bill of Rights section so that it is enforceable. With specific rights clearly spelled out, such amendments could potentially keep cases out of courts since citizens and regulators would have clear text to refer to when evaluating potential projects. Some are concerned that these amendments will increase the number of legal cases.

== Uruguay ==
The Constitution of Uruguay in its current version includes an article about environmental protection (Art. 47). Together with other proposals, this amendment was approved by popular referendum on 8 December 1996.

Subsequently, another amendment was approved by referendum on 31 October 2004. Art. 47 was expanded with dispositions related to water resources, which since then cannot be privatized. Friends of the Earth also supported the move, saying it "sets a key precedent for the protection of water worldwide, by enshrining these principles into the national constitution of one country by means of direct democracy."
