= Zoocentrism =

zoocentrism may refer to:

- The claim that at least some animals have moral standing, similar to Biocentrism (ethics)
- Plant blindness – Human tendency to ignore plants
- Speciesism – Philosophical term on species treatment
