= Free play =

Childhood activity

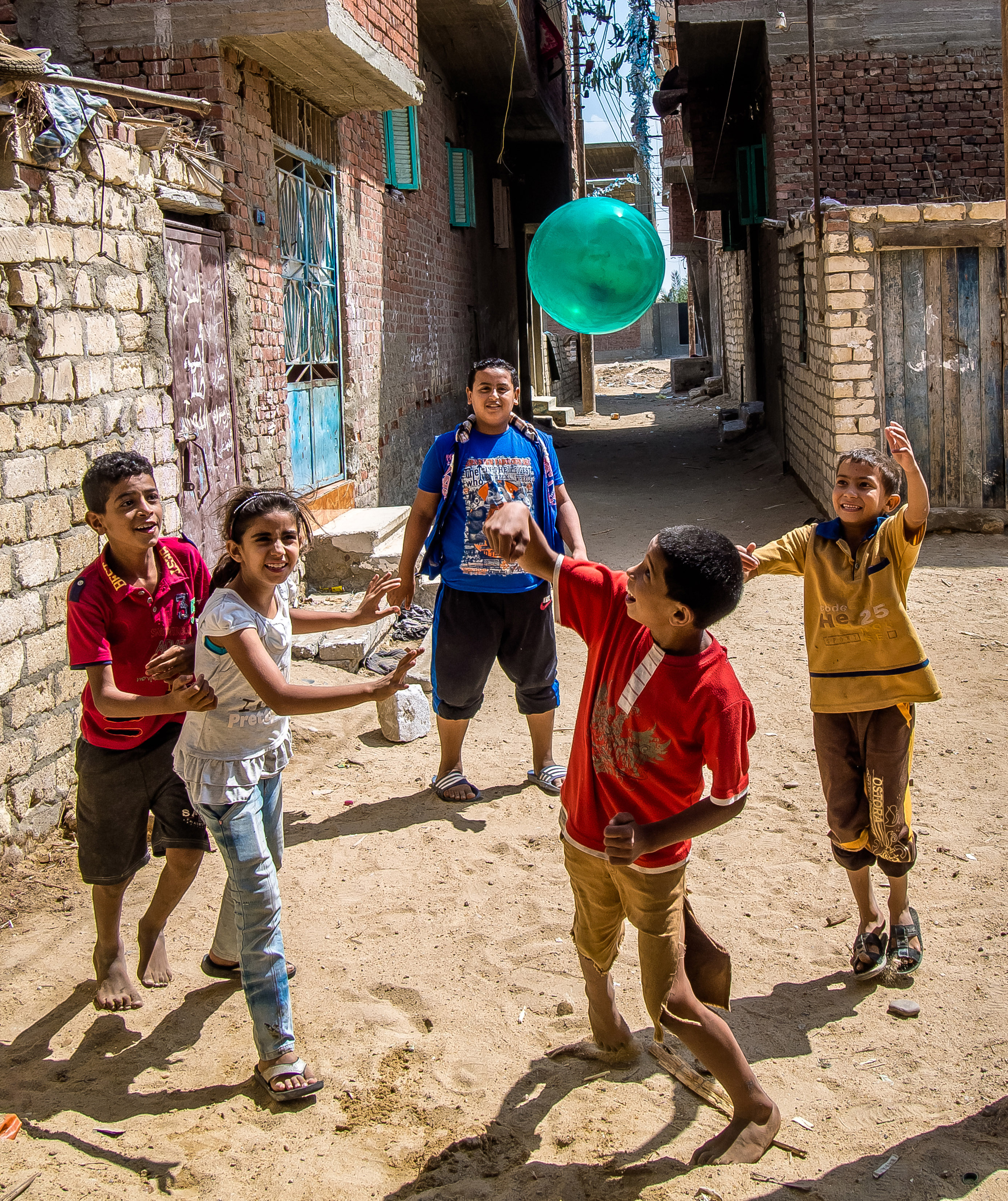
A group of children playing with a balloon; Ismailia, Egypt

Free play is unstructured play among children without adult supervision who decide themselves how and what to play and make up the rules as they go along. Free play is crucial for child development, and promotes social skills, emotional health, resilience, cooperation, confidence, cognitive growth, and brain development.

A lack of free play has negative effects in childhood and through adolescence and beyond, but it isn't clear how serious the consequences are. Declines in unstructured outdoor play among children in the last few decades has led to concern among experts about negative physical and mental effects in many countries including increased obesity, depression, anxiety, and other issues.

== Definitions ==
Mark Twain, in the voice of Tom Sawyer (1876), defined play in contrast with work: "Work consists of whatever a body is obliged to do, and play consists of whatever a body is not obliged to do."

Peter Gray defined free play as unstructured play among children without adult supervision "in which the players themselves decide what and how to play and are free to modify the goals and rules as they go along. Pickup baseball is free play; a Little League game is not."

Ellen Greenlaw defines it as "any type of unstructured play that is directed by the child".

Free play is play that isn’t organized or directed by adults or older peers and that generally doesn't have a defined purpose or outcome.

Free play has been termed "self-directed", as opposed to play which is guided by adults. An earlier term for this is unstructured play.

The term free play was used in its current sense in the 1967 educational film Organizing Free Play, produced by Vassar College for project Head Start (program) training programs.

Make believe, also known as "pretend play", "fantasy play" or "imaginative play", is a loosely structured form of play that generally includes role-play, object substitution, and nonliteral behavior.

The age group involved when discussing "children" is the years between about six and twelve. This the time when children, not yet affected by puberty, are involved in making friends, engaging in athletics, hobbies, and other non-sexual activities.

== History ==
=== Background ===
The history of early childhood education dates to the early nineteenth century, and began in Germany with Friedrich Fröbel's kindergarten, and in Britain with the infant school in Great Britain. These were both teacher-led efforts. In the kindergartens, the focus was not on teaching subjects but on a holistic approach developing basic social, emotional, motor and cognitive skills, with children taking an active part and supported by the teacher. In the British infant schools, traditional primary school subjects were taught in brief lessons with play and relaxation making up the time in between. Play was considered important in both systems, and continues to be.

Friedrich Fröbel, the founder of kindergarten, also invented the sandbox as a place to stimulate free play among children in the 1830s. He also employed free play outdoors in nature to teach children motor and creative skills. By the 1850s, sand gardens (German: sandgarten) were established in Berlin, and by 1885, reached Boston, and by 1889 a dozen other U.S. cities.

Jean Piaget analyzed play as activities engaged in for pleasure in three behavioral categories: sensorimotor (repetitive bodily interactions with an object or themself without purpose), symbolic (using one object to stand in for another), and games with rules. These develop in parallel with thought, as it passes through each of these stages in turn.

Lev Vygotsky was a Russian and Soviet psychologist, best known for his work in the 1920s on psychological development in children. In contrast to Piaget, Vygotsky focused on just one type, symbolic play. Where Piaget considered that a child had already separated referent from object (e.g., a stick that was a pretend item from the horse it represented) Vygotsky believed that it was through symbolic play that a child learned to make this separation, and in doing so, develop their faculties of abstract thought.

Vygotsky‘s work on childhood was brief, but innovative and ahead of his time. He stressed the importance of representational play (make-believe; fantasy play) that flourishes in the preschool years and that later evolves into structured play with games and rules in middle childhood. It was central to his theory, and he viewed it was a leading factor in the development of fantasy play. He saw children as advancing themselves in psychological development, using make believe as a zone of development enabling such progress. Vygotsky saw play as having two unique features: it creates an imaginary situation that allows the child to work out unrealizable desires, and there are social rules based on real-world situations that define the parameters of the imaginary scenarios constructed by the child. Thus he saw this type of play as being an imaginary situation governed by socially determined rules.

=== Rise ===
Howard Chudacoff in his 2007 history of children at play called the first half of the twentieth century the "Golden Age of Unstructured Play".

=== Decline ===
In the second half of the century, however, free play declined sharply, and experts have noticed increases in anxiety, depression, and other problems in children and adolescents. Unstructured outdoor play in children 3–12 has declined in the forty years since 1975, while computer and electronic games have increased in the first decade of the 21st century, leading to concerns about the ill effects of growing childhood obesity in many countries. A few countries such as Hungary and Taiwan have taken steps at the governmental policy level to ensure opportunities for children to engage in free play.

A 2009 international study reported a decline in spontaneous play in the two decades preceding the study due to multiple factors such as increased time other activities, especially with television and digital media, as well as organized sports and other extra-curricular activities, lack of nearby venues for play, and reduction of recess in school. It found that the amount of time spent on outdoor activity was being replaced by indoor activities like television, video games, and computers, and this was universal across multiple countries, whether in developed or developing countries, with the latter having the highest levels of television watching and least outdoor play.

== International aspects ==
A 2009 international study and literature review found that free play was universal among children in different nations as reported by their mothers.

== Gender profile ==
An international study showed that nine-year old boys prefer playing with other boys, and preferred more physical or aggressive play, while girls eight to ten prefer to play alone, and was expressed less in physical activity. In children of pre-school age, girls tended to engage in more make-believe play, but boys caught up by age five, and that this largely held across the sixteen countries studied.

== Types ==
The type or categories that one divides up free play depends on the theoretical basis underlying it. Smilansky divided it up into functional, constructive, dramatic, and rule-based. Various types of play that fall under the definition of free play, including:

- Creative –drawing, coloring, painting, sculpting, playing with art supplies, crafting
- Imaginative –dress-up, Acting out stories, role-playing
- Physical – Running around; climbing, swinging, or playing on playground equipment; playing games like hide-and-seek or tag
- Constructive – building with blocks, Lego, or other materials
- Sensory – playing with sand, water, clay or similar materials (not to be confused with Piagetian sensorimotor play which occurs in infancy)
- Exploratory – collecting rocks, leaves, and seashells; exploring with magnifying glasses, nets, and magnets
- Independent – reading; playing with toys or items (of their choice)
- Social – playing with others in their age group; inventing games to play together
- Symbolic – make-believe; pretend; one object standing in for another

== Health impact ==
=== Benefits ===
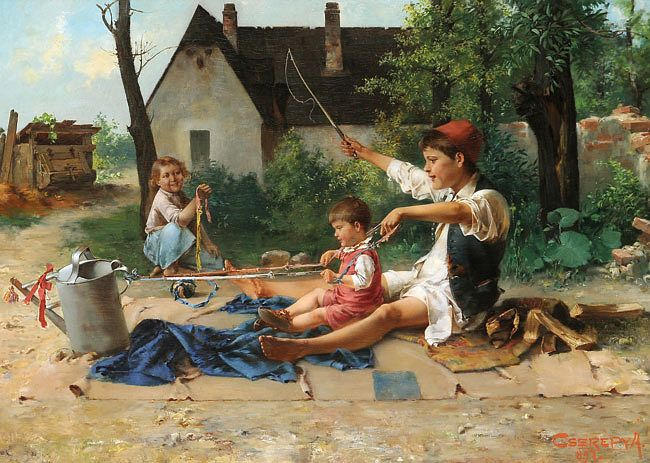
Children playing; by Árpád Cserépy (1897)

Free play is crucial to children learning about their own interests, in exploring their world, and to thrive physically, emotionally, mentally, and socially.

It is a natural and critical period of child development that is crucial for developing social skills, emotional health, resiliency, stress management, cooperation, confidence, building cognitive skills, and even brain size.

A 2014 study investigated development of executive functions in children, and found that the more time children spent in unstructured activity, the better their self-directed executive functioning was. Conversely, the more time spent in structured activities, the worse it was.

It's hard to isolate playfulness from other developmental factors, so the best evidence for the benefits of play comes from its use in mental health treatments. For instance, structured play in an Indian orphanage led to major gains in motor, cognitive, and social skills despite continued deprivation in the orphanage setting.

Physically, free play contributes to motor skills, coordination, and overall health by promoting active movement.

After free play during recess at school, children pay more attention than they do following after adult-led, structured physical activity.

=== Risks of deprivation ===
Lack of opportunities for free play in childhood carries a risk negative effects on growing children, and may be long-lasting. Psychologists are not in agreement on the amount of risk involved. Concerns are that it may result in anxious, unhappy and socially maladjusted adults.

Research from animal studies shows that play deprivation hinders development in key areas of the prefrontal cortex. There is less data for human children because of ethics considerations, but similar effects were observed in severely maltreated children, such as those in Romanian orphanages, who showed impaired brain development and abnormal play behavior.

Studies in prisoner populations have found an overrepresentation of inmates that were deprived of free play opportunities. A commission established following the Texas tower shooting in 1966 found that the shooter's motivation was tied to a severe restriction of free play during childhood.

=== Outside factors ===
Various studies have examined the character or quality of free play as a measure of the influence of outside factors such as a history of maternal depression, family discord or hostility, or personality disorders in a parent on the development and adjustment of children.

=== Therapy ===
The use of play therapy showed social improvements in children with autism spectrum disorder in several areas. including making friends, interactions with others, family relationships, dealing with stress, and less time spent playing alone.

== As human right ==
The Convention on the Rights of the Child (CRC) is an international human rights treaty adopted by the United Nations in 1989 which sets out the civil, political, economic, social, health and cultural rights of children. Article 31 affirms a child's right to play.

== See also ==
- Child
- Cooperative learning
- Democratic education
- Developmental psychology
- Early sports specialization
- Generation Alpha
- Green Hour
- Learning through play
- Man, Play and Games
- Outdoor education
- Play equity
- Pre-school playgroup
- Recess (break)
- Social-emotional learning
- Sociocultural theory

== Works cited ==
- Barker, Jane E; Semenov, Andrei D; Michaelson, Laura; et al. (16 June 2014). "Less-structured time in children's daily lives predicts self-directed executive functioning". Frontiers in Psychology. 5: 593. doi:10.3389/fpsyg.2014.00593. PMC 4060299. PMID 25071617.
- Bassett, David R.; John, Dinesh; Conger, Scott A.; et al. (2015). "Trends in Physical Activity and Sedentary Behaviors of United States Youth". Journal of Physical Activity and Health. 12 (8): 1102–1111. doi:10.1123/jpah.2014-0050. PMID 25347913. p. 1104: "Trends in outdoor play have received increased attention in recent years. Louv has proposed that children today spend less time in unstructured, outdoor play, compared with previous generations. A decline in outdoor play is concerning for a number of reasons, and might reflect increased time spent indoors engaged with electronic entertainment. ... Over the past 4 decades, societal trends suggest that physical activity levels have declined within several key domains."
- Berk, Laura E. (November 1994). "Vygotsky's Theory: The Importance of Make-Believe Play". Young Children. 50 (1): 30–39.
- Chudacoff, Howard P. (2007). "5. The Golden Age of Unstructured Play, 1900–1950". Children at play: an American history. New York: NYU Press. pp. 126–153. doi:10.18574/nyu/9780814790052 (inactive 1 July 2025). ISBN 978-0-8147-1665-6. OCLC 181104517.
- Clay, Rebecca A. (26 September 2023). "The many wondrous benefits of unstructured play". American Psychological Association.
- The Campaign for U.S. Ratification of the Convention on the Rights of the Child (CRC), ed. (2018). "What is the CRC?". Archived from the original on 9 May 2020.
- The Campaign for U.S. Ratification of the Convention on the Rights of the Child (CRC), ed. (2018). "What is the CRC?". Archived from the original on 9 May 2020.
- Fein, Greta (December 1981). "Pretend Play in Childhood: An Integrative Review". Child Development. 52 (4): 1095–1118. doi:10.1111/j.1467-8624.1981.tb03157.x. JSTOR 1129497.
- Gowrie NSW (2022). "Types of Play for Early Childhood Development". Erskineville NSW: Gowrie New South Wales. Archived from the original on 7 March 2022.
- Gray, Peter (3 April 2011). "The Decline of Play and the Rise of Psychopathology in Children and Adolescents" (pdf). American Journal of Play: 443–463. p. 1: "Over the past half century or so, in the United States and in some other developed nations, opportunities for children to play, especially to play outdoors with other children, have continually declined. Over this same period, measures of psychopathology in children and adolescents—including indices of anxiety, depression, feelings of helplessness, and narcissism—have continually increased"
- Gray, Peter (2013). Free to Learn: Why Unleashing the Instinct to Play Will Make Our Children Happier, More Self-Reliant, and Better Students for Life. Basic Books. ISBN 9780465037919. OCLC 815835659. p. 7: "I refer to this as free play, defined as play in which the players themselves decide what and how to play and are free to modify the goals and drules as they go along. Pickup baseball is free play; a Little League game is not. Free play is how children learn to structure their own behavior."
- Greenlaw, Ellen (28 October 2020). "Let them play: Why free play is crucial for kids". BCH Medical Education. Boston Children's Hospital. "Free play is any type of unstructured play that is directed by the child. It helps children develop their imaginations while experiencing and exploring the world around them. Samantha Swankowski, a certified child life specialist at Boston Children's Hospital, says providing time for free play is important, especially for younger kids."
- Jones, Emily S. (1 October 1967). "Vassar's Own Film Series". Vassar Quarterly. LIII (1). Alumnae/i Association of Vassar College. ISSN 0042-2851. p. 12: "During the academic year 1966-67 the Film Program engaged in the production of three additional films for Head Start training programs—with more time for planning these. ORGANIZING FREE PLAY and HEAD START TO CONFIDENCE were completed in time for the summer's training programs and over 300 copies of these films were made available along with the earlier Head Start films, for free distribution through Modern Talking Picture Service, Inc."
- Lillard, Angeline S. (2015). "The Development of Play" (PDF). In Liben, Lynn S.; Mueller, Ulrich; Lerner, Richard M. (eds.). Handbook of Child Psychology and Developmental Science. Volume 2, Cognitive Processes (Seventh illustrated ed.). Hoboken, NJ: Wiley. pp. 425–468. ISBN 9781118136782. OCLC 908071157.
- Mader, Jackie (14 November 2022). "Want resilient and well-adjusted kids? Let them play". Hechinger Report. New York: Hechinger Institute on Education and the Media, Columbia University. "Numerous researchers have found play is a natural and critical part of child development. When researchers compared information about [prison] inmates' childhoods with a population outside the prison, they found that the comparison group could provide abundant examples of free play in childhood, while the group inside prison largely could not. ... 'The presence or absence of play, particularly in child development, has a great deal to do with competency, resiliency, emotional health [and] brain size,' [Stuart] Brown said."
- Moyer, Melinda Wenner (1 May 2016). "Unstructured Play Is Critical to Child Development". Scientific American. "'Free play,' as scientists call it, is critical for becoming socially adept, coping with stress and building cognitive skills such as problem solving. ... Most psychologists agree that play affords benefits that last through adulthood, but they do not always agree on the extent to which a lack of play harms kids. ... Psychologists worry that limiting free play in kids may result in a generation of anxious, unhappy and socially maladjusted adults. Free play is most similar to play seen in the animal kingdom, suggesting that it has important evolutionary roots."
- Mundt, Christoph, ed. (1996). Interpersonal Factors in the Origin and Course of Affective Disorders. Gaskell academic series. London: RCPsych Publications. ISBN 9780902241909. OCLC 36011921.
- Murnaghan, Ann Marie F.; Shillington, Laura J., eds. (26 May 2016). Children, Nature, Cities (illustrated ed.). Abingdon: Routledge. ISBN 978-1-317-16768-6. OCLC 950739086.
- Murray, Jane (2018). "The play's the thing". International Journal of Early Years Education. 26 (4): 335–339. doi:10.1080/09669760.2018.1527278. ISSN 0966-9760. OCLC 7871729595.
- NIFP (2025). "Our Founder - National Institute for Play". National Institute for Play. "The commission was tasked with investigating and understanding what was then the largest such mass murder in U.S. history. ... Ultimately the commission unanimously agreed that the cause of Whitman's killing spree was that his free play had been systematically suppressed by a sadistic, overbearing father."
- Nowogrodzki, Julian (8 January 2025). "Why kids need to take more risks: science reveals the benefits of wild, free play". Nature. 637 (8045): 266–268. Bibcode:2025Natur.637..266N. doi:10.1038/d41586-024-04215-2. PMID 39780002. "Research has emerged showing that opportunities for risky play are crucial for healthy physical, mental and emotional development. Children need these opportunities to develop spatial awareness, coordination, tolerance of uncertainty and confidence. ... Risky play is associated with greater resilience, self-confidence, problem-solving and social skills such as cooperation, negotiation and empathy. Outdoor risky play might have extra benefits."
- Parrott, Heather Macpherson; Cohen, Lynn E. (2020). "Advocating for Play: The Benefits of Unstructured Play in Public Schools" (PDF). School Community Journal (30): 229–254.
- Pellegrini, Anthony D.; Smith, Peter K. (May 1998). "The Development of Play During Childhood: Forms and Possible Functions". Child Psychology and Psychiatry Review. 3 (2): 51–57. doi:10.1111/1475-3588.00212.
- Samuelsson, Ingrid Pramling; Pramling, Niklas (July 2023) [June 2013]. "Play and learning". Encyclopedia on Early Childhood Development (pdf) (revised ed.). CEECD Université de Montréal.
- Singer, Dorothy G.; Singer, Jerome L.; D'Agnostino, Heidi; DeLong, Raeka (2009). "Children's Pastimes and Play in Sixteen Nations: Is Free-Play Declining?". American Journal of Play. 1 (3): 283–312.
- Stone, Jeannette Galambos; Project Head Start (1969). Organizing Free Play: A Program Manual and Study Guide (leaflet). Washington, D.C.: U.S. Department of Health, Education, and Welfare. OCLC 3862617.
- Whitebread, David (November 2017). "Free play and children's mental health". The Lancet Child & Adolescent Health. 1 (3): 167–169. doi:10.1016/S2352-4642(17)30092-5. PMID 30169163.
- Yogman, Michael; Garner, Andrew; Hutchinson, Jeffrey; et al. (1 September 2018). "The Power of Play: A Pediatric Role in Enhancing Development in Young Children". Pediatrics. 142 (3): 1–16. doi:10.1542/peds.2018-2058. PMID 30126932.
