= The human right to a clean, healthy and sustainable environment =

United Nations Resolution

HRC/RES/48/13

UN Human Rights Council
- Long title: The human right to a clean, healthy and sustainable environment
- Citation: A/HRC/RES/48/13
- Enacted by: UN Human Rights Council
- Enacted: 8 October 2021

The human right to a clean, healthy and sustainable environment is a resolution by the United Nations General Assembly and before that the United Nations Human Rights Council (HRC, as HRC/RES/48/13), that recognizes a healthy environment as a human right. It was adopted at the 48th session of the HRC, marking the first time that the HRC recognized a human right in a resolution. The draft resolution was put forward by the core group comprising Costa Rica (Penholder: Mariana Castro), Morocco, Slovenia, Switzerland and the Maldives. The vote passed with 43 votes in favor, 0 votes against, and 4 abstentions (China, India, Japan and the Russian Federation).

== Human Rights Council ==
The HRC resolution in itself is not legally binding, but it "invites the United Nations General Assembly to consider the matter" (i.e. the human right to a clean, healthy and sustainable environment).

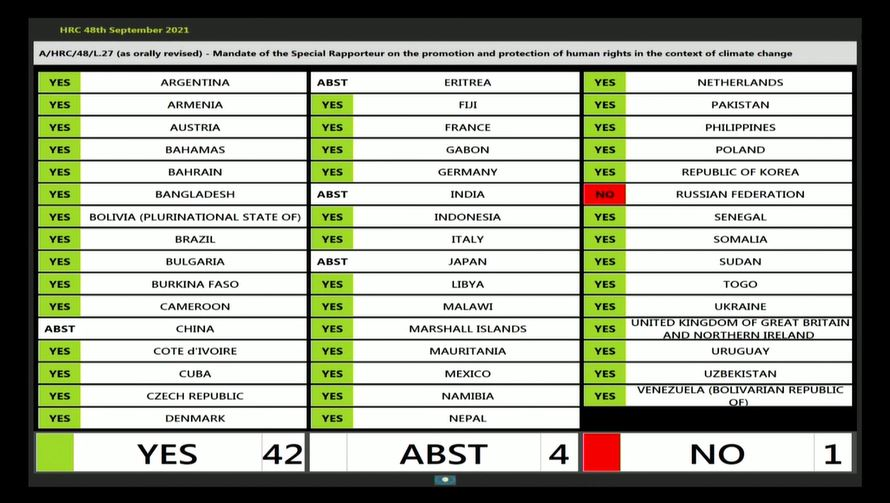
Vote of the Human Rights Council on the related HRC/48/L.27

== UN General Assembly ==
In 2022 during its 76th session, the United Nations General Assembly adopted a resolution recognizing the human right to a clean, healthy, and sustainable environment. Although General Assembly resolutions are not legally binding, this resolution was welcomed by UN High Commissioner for Human Rights Michelle Bachelet, multiple special rapporteurs and members of some civil society organizations.

== See also ==
- Right to a healthy environment
- Human rights and climate change
