= OpEPA =

Non-governmental environmental education organization

- Organization for Environmental Education and Protection Corp
- Organización para la Educación y Protección Ambiental
- Formation: 1998; 28 years ago
- Website: opepa.org

OpEPA, formally the Organización para la Educación y Protección Ambiental in Colombia and the Organization for Environmental Education and Protection Corp in the United States, is a non-governmental environmental education organization with offices in Colombia and the United States. It is a registered 501(c)(3) in the US. Its cofounders are Camilo Camargo, Nicole Zangen, Catalina Saravia, and Luis Alberto Camargo (Ashoka Fellow 2005, Young Global Leader 2008, Salzburg Fellow).

== Organization ==
OpEPA is a Colombian collaborative social entrepreneurship civil society organization founded in 1998.

It focuses on four main areas, accelerating the transition towards regeneration for individuals, institutions, and public policy:

- Education with a nature-based relational approach
- Sustainable and regenerative tourism
- Transition to regenerative cultures
- Planetary boundaries (climate change, biodiversity and ecosystems, soils and nutrients, water)

== Impact ==
OpEPA has worked with more than 160,000 students and strengthened more than 6,000 educators in environmental and nature-based education across Colombia, Chile, Peru, Panama, Costa Rica, the United States, Canada, and 12 bioregions in Europe. OpEPA has supported environmental leadership and ecotourism processes at different scales throughout these territories.

Internationally, OpEPA is a co-leader in the Regenerative Communities Network, and The Weaving Lab. Co-founder Luis Alberto Camargo is also a founding member of Catalyst NOW (formerly Catalyst 2030).

OpEPA has promoted the Children and Nature Movement, focusing on breaking the cycle that produces Nature Deficit Disorder.

== Nature-based Education Methodology ==
OpEPA's core pedagogical approach is grounded in nature-based education (NbE), a framework that uses direct experience with natural environments as the primary context for learning. The methodology integrates outdoor education, place-based learning, and regenerative systems thinking to foster ecological literacy and environmental stewardship among children, youth, and educators.

OpEPA's immersive outdoor programs average five days in length and focus primarily on children ages 8 to 12, while also offering leadership development for educators, young adults, and policy makers. A nature-based education network founded in Bogotá has been replicated in 13 other Colombian cities in cooperation with the Ministry of the Environment.

OpEPA co-leads the Global Initiative on Nature-based Education within the IUCN Commission on Education and Communication (CEC), contributing to international policy frameworks and research on the relationship between nature connection and learning outcomes. The IUCN has published an Explainer Brief on Nature-based Education (2025) drawing on OpEPA's methodology and research.

In 2025, Salzburg Global Fellows — including leaders from conservation, environment, and education — developed the Salzburg Statement on Nature-Based Education, a roadmap for embedding nature into education systems globally. The Statement calls on education leaders to integrate Nature-Based Education at scale to address learning, well-being, and planetary crises.

== Publications ==
OpEPA co-founder Luis Alberto Camargo co-authored the following peer-reviewed and institutional publications on nature-based education:

- Camargo, L.; Segovia, N. (2026). We are nature: nature-based education for planetary health. Gland, Switzerland: IUCN. doi:10.2305/INLY9964. ISBN 978-2-8317-2383-9.
- Charles, C.; et al. (2018). Home to Us All: How Connecting with Nature Helps Us Care for Ourselves and the Earth (PDF) (Report). Children & Nature Network / #NatureForAll / IUCN.

== International Networks and Partnerships ==
OpEPA is an active member of several global networks working at the intersection of education, nature, and regeneration:

- IUCN Commission on Education and Communication (CEC) — Co-founder Luis Alberto Camargo serves as Regional Vice President for South America and co-leads the Global Initiative on Nature-based Education.
- NatureForAll — Global movement led by IUCN connecting more than 130 organizations to inspire people to love and protect nature.
- Catalyst NOW — Global network of social innovators working to accelerate solutions to sustainable development challenges.
- REGEN10 — International initiative accelerating the transition to regenerative food and land use systems.
- Conscious Food Systems Alliance (CoFSA) — UNDP initiative transforming food systems toward regenerative practices. Co-founder Luis Alberto Camargo serves on the Wisdom Council.

== Recognition ==
OpEPA has received international recognition for its contributions to environmental and nature-based education:

- WISE Award, for its nature-based education networks project (2023) — Qatar Foundation. Selected as one of six global winners from 404 nominated projects worldwide.
- Richard Louv Prize for Innovation in Nature Connection (2023) — Awarded to co-founder Luis Alberto Camargo, selected from more than 70 nominations worldwide, for more than 25 years of work connecting children with nature.
- Salzburg Statement on Nature-Based Education (2025) — Co-developed by Salzburg Global Fellows as a global roadmap for embedding nature into education systems, addressing learning, well-being, and planetary crises.
- IUCN Explainer Brief on Nature-based Education (2025) — OpEPA's methodology and research cited in the official IUCN policy brief on nature-based education.
- HundrED Innovation — Selected as a globally significant educational innovation by HundrED.
- Ashoka (2005) — Co-founder Luis Alberto Camargo selected as Ashoka Fellow for social entrepreneurship.
- World Economic Forum Young Global Leader (2008) — Co-founder Luis Alberto Camargo recognized as Young Global Leader.

== Mission ==
OpEPA's mission is to reconnect people with the Earth to accelerate the transition toward sustainable and regenerative cultures.

Through this reconnection, children and youth become agents in reducing environmental degradation and promoting a generation of decision makers more oriented towards sustainable regeneration.
