= Nature exposure and mental health =

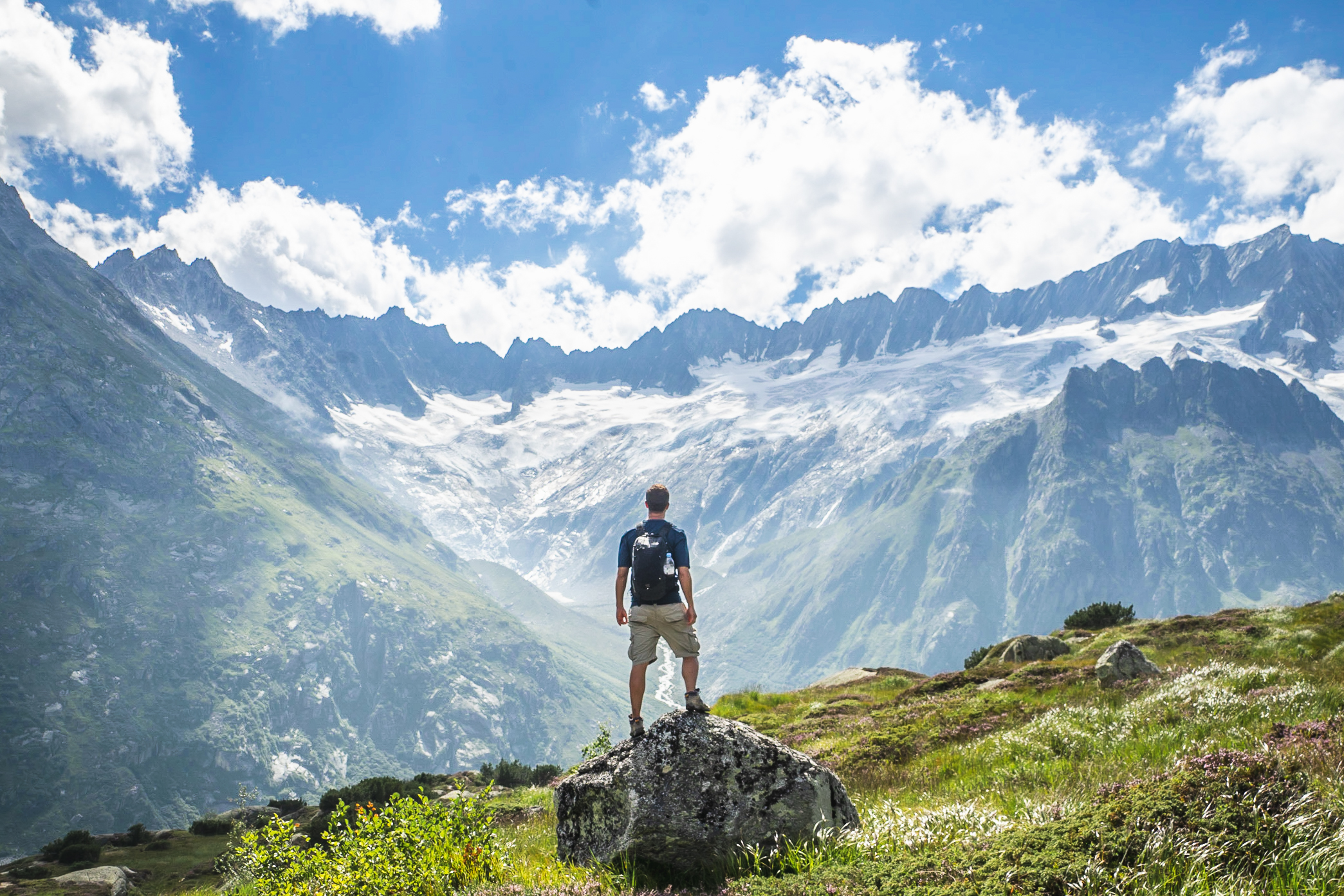
Person standing in front of Swiss Alps

Nature exposure and mental health refers to the association between an individual interacting with natural environments and its effect on the individual's mental health. Most studies consider any interaction with nature as exposure, such as a hike, being in a forest or a place with water (e.g. lake, beach), going on a walk in a park, etc. Currently there is extensive research on the impact of the exposure to nature on people, which finds a beneficial association in various ways. Studies show that the contact of human beings with nature has decreased with the contemporary lifestyle of being most of the time indoors and with increasing time spent on screens. However, the interaction with nature has been considered to be a general health promoter thanks to the many benefits it brings to mental health and cognition as well. As a consequence, therapists use nature in their treatments to improve mental or physical health. These treatments and techniques are called ecotherapy.

== Mental health and emotional impact ==
Mental health has been defined as the state of mental well-being that enables people to cope with the stresses of life, realize their abilities, learn well and work well, and contribute to their community. Research on the exposure to natural environments show that nature strengthens our mental health in multiple ways, such as lowering stress and improving mood. Moreover, there is evidence that demonstrates that the contact with nature is associated with increases in happiness, subjective well-being, positive affect, positive social interactions and a sense of meaning and purpose in life, as well as decreases in mental distress. A practical example of this are nature walks. These can increase brain activity in the subgenual prefrontal cortex, which becomes deactivated when a person is feeling anxious or depressed.

Research shows that the mental health effects of nature are positive across all ages. In regards to children, in Denmark there was a study done throughout eighteen years that analyzed the comparison between children ages 0–10 years old that lived in neighborhoods with more green space and children from lower levels of exposure to green space. It was found that the children from the higher level of green space had 55% less risk of developing multiple psychiatric disorders, such as depression, schizophrenia, substance disorder, eating disorders, and mood disorders. Similarly, another study done in four European cities found that adults with low levels of exposure to outdoor environments in childhood had significantly worse mental health compared to adults with high levels of exposure to outdoor environments in childhood. A 10-year UK study found that both the greeness of people's home surroundings (within 300m of their home) and their access to green and blue spaces nearby (such as parks, lakes and beaches) both reduced people's risk of anxiety and depression. In addition, there are restorative effects from nature that support the mental health and well-being for the elderly. Studies show that the interaction of older adults with nature can be linked to better moods, decreased chance of depression, reduced stress levels and improved cognitive function.

Greenspace near the home has been found to be inversely associated with some health risk behaviours, such as smoking and drinking alcohol, and visiting natural spaces regularly has been linked to a lower prevalence of smoking.The results of such studies suggest that increasing residential greenspace and visits to nature might be a promising strategy for reducing health risk behaviours.

== Cognitive impact ==
Cognition refers to all forms of knowing and awareness, such as perceiving, conceiving, remembering, reasoning, judging, imagining, and problem solving. Thanks to both correlational and experimental research, a positive association has been found between the environment and cognitive abilities. Some of the main benefits that studies have found are improvement on working memory performance, improved attention, cognitive flexibility, and attentional-control tasks. In contrast, exposure to urban environments has been linked to attention deficits.

Short periods of nature exposure can also cause cognitive benefits, including exposure just through images. An attentional-control experiment made by Australian researchers asked college students to participate in a dull, attention-draining task in which they had to press a computer key when they saw certain numbers flash on the screen. Midway through the task participants had micro-breaks of 40 seconds in which they would see either a city scene with a flowering meadow green roof or a bare concrete roof. The participants that viewed the green roof made significantly less omission errors and showed more consistent responding to the task compared to participants who viewed the concrete roof according to the study. Such changes in attention can reflect, for example, on how humans perceive time in nature when compared to urban environments.

In addition to the exposure to images of nature, multiple experimental studies have used a wide range of stimulus types such as sounds and real world exposure. These studies have compared participants' cognitive performance after nature exposure in comparison with urban environments. A significant impact that has been discovered consistently with natural environments is the improvement in working memory. This has been found persistently through a backward digital span task, in which participants are told to repeat sequences of numbers (which vary in length) in reverse order. Likewise, participants that had exposure to natural environments improved their performance.

== City parks and mental health ==
While the conversation around nature exposure and mental health generally looks at the natural world outside of cities and the urban environment, nature exposure in cities also have a positive impact on individuals' mental health and wellbeing. In particular, city parks can have a large positive impact on resident mental health - the mental health of residents living more than 800m (but less than 1.6km) from a park declined by 4.5 points as compared to residents within 400m of a park. Urban parks have been shown to contribute to stress reduction, mental restoration, life satisfaction, and lower risk of anxiety and depression. Urban parks present cost-effective, accessible ways to provide conditions that improve mental health regardless of residents' socioeconomic, racial, or other identities and as such can serve as a path towards accessible mental health equity.

== See also ==
- Ecopsychology
- Nature therapy
- Shinrin-yoku
- Therapeutic garden
