= Global Pact for the Environment =

Multilateral agreement on the environment

The Global Pact for the Environment project was launched in 2017 by a network of experts known as the "International Group of Experts for the Pact" (IGEP). The group is made up of more than a hundred legal experts in environmental law and is chaired by former COP21 President Laurent Fabius.

On 10 May 2018, the United Nations General Assembly adopted, by 142 votes in favor, 5 votes against (United States, Russia, Syria, Turkey, and the Philippines) and 7 abstentions (Saudi Arabia, Belarus, Iran, Malaysia, Nicaragua, Nigeria, and Tajikistan), a resolution paving the way for the negotiation of a Global Pact for the Environment (Resolution A/72/L.51 of 10 May 2018, "Towards a Global Pact for the Environment").

On 8 May 2020, the United Nations Environment Programme nominated two co-facilitators to lead the process. Their mandate is to lead informal consultations to prepare a first draft of a "political declaration" that is to be debated at the UN Environmental Assembly's fifth session in February 2021. This text was adopted in March 2022 during a special session of the fifth United Nations Environment Assembly, called UNEP@50, that commemorated the 50th anniversary of the establishment of the United Nations Environment Programme.

== Objectives ==
The Global Pact for the Environment seeks to recognize the rights and duties of citizens and governments towards the Planet. Its approach is to enshrine the fundamental principles of environmental law in a legally binding instrument, thereby remedying the shortcomings of international environmental law. While these principles are already contained in political declarations such as the 1972 Stockholm Declaration and the 1992 Rio Declaration, they currently lack legal force.

In contrast to these declarations, a Global Pact would be a multilateral treaty endowed with legal force that would enshrine fundamental environmental rights as well as the principles that guide environmental action. Building on the dynamic of the Sustainable Development Goals and the Paris Agreement, a Global Pact would raise the threshold for environmental protection worldwide. It is intended for global adoption. It would complement existing sectoral conventions, such as the Paris Agreement or the Montreal Protocol by enshrining principles that would apply to the Environment as a whole. If adopted, it would be the first international treaty that takes a comprehensive and non-sectorial approach to the environment.

The Global Pact's methodology to enhance environmental standards is to recognize a "third generation of fundamental rights" – environmental rights. This approach mirrors that of the two international covenants of 1966: the International Covenant on Civil and Political Rights (ICCPR), and the International Covenant on Economic, Social and Cultural Rights (ICESCR), which are generally seen as having enshrined the first two generations of human rights.

== Origins ==
The Global Pact for the Environment was first proposed in 2017 by an international network of more than a hundred experts (professors, judges, lawyers) from forty different countries now known as the "International Group of Experts for the Pact" (IGEP). The current IGEP chair is Laurent Fabius, President of the French Constitutional Council and former President of COP 21. Its Secretary-General is Yann Aguila, a lawyer at the Paris Bar and President of the Environment Committee of the Club des Juristes, a French legal think tank.

Notable members of IGEP include:

- Antonio Herman Benjamin, judge at the Superior Court of Justice of Brazil.
- Bruce Ackerman, Sterling professor of law and political science, Yale University.
- Laurence Boisson de Chazournes, professor, University of Geneva.
- David Boyd, professor of law, University of British Columbia, UN Special Rapporteur on Human Rights and the Environment.
- Lord Robert Carnwath, Justice of the Supreme Court of the United Kingdom.
- Parvez Hassan, senior advocate in the Supreme Court of Pakistan.
- Marie Jacobsson, former member of the UN International Law Commission from 2007 to 2016 and special rapporteur.
- Donald Kaniaru, former director of environmental implementation at UNEP.
- Swatanter Kumar, former judge of the Indian Supreme Court, former president of the National Indian Green Court.
- Luc Lavrysen, Dutch Language President of the Belgian Constitutional Court.
- Pilar Moraga Sariego, Professor at the Center for Environmental Law, Faculty of Law, University of Chile.
- Tianbao Qin, Professor, Wuhan University, Secretary-General, Chinese Society for Environmental and Natural Resources Law.
- Nicholas A. Robinson, Professor, Elisabeth Haub School of Law, University of Pace, New York.
- Jorge E. Vinuales, Professor, University of Cambridge.
- Margaret Young, Associate Professor, Faculty of Law, University of Melbourne.

Enshrining fundamental principles of environmental law in a universal binding treaty is however not a novel idea. Environmental lawyers have been calling on States to adopt such a treaty at least since the 1987 Brundtland report, which elaborated a list of "Legal Principles for Environmental Protection and Sustainable Development." In 1995, the International Union for Conservation of Nature (IUCN) also proposed a draft International Pact on Environment and Development. In 2015, the Environment Committee of the Club des Juristes likewise proposed the adoption of an international environmental treaty.

== Content ==
A preliminary draft was conceived by IGEP experts in 2017 to serve as a basis for international talks. The definitive wording of the text is still subject to negotiations.

The preliminary draft is structured around a preamble and twenty fundamental principles, balanced between rights and duties and supplemented by six articles dealing with final provisions. The text is based on two "source principles", a right and a duty: the right to an ecologically sound environment and the duty to take care of the environment. These substantive and procedural principles are already widely established and accepted in previous environmental declarations. Yet, a Global Pact would elevate these principles from guiding ideas to legally binding, enforceable sources of law for legislators and courts in all UN member states.

Substantive principles include:

- The Prevention Principle (Article 5): necessary measures shall be taken to prevent environmental harm.
- The Precautionary Principle (Article 6): where there is a risk of serious or irreversible damage, lack of scientific certainty shall not be used as a reason to prevent environmental degradation.
- Duty to Repair Environmental Damage (Article 7): necessary measures shall be taken to ensure adequate remediation of environmental damages.
- Polluter-Pays (Article 8): costs for pollution should be borne by their originator.

Procedural principles include:

- Right to Information (Article 9): every person has a right to access environmental information held by public authorities.
- Public Participation (Article 10): every person has the right to participate in the preparation of decisions that may have a significant effect on the environment.
- Access to Environmental Justice (Article 11): States shall ensure the right of effective and affordable remedy to challenge acts that contravene environmental law.

The preliminary draft of the Global Pact proposes innovations such as the official recognition of the role of civil society in protecting the environment. It further includes the principle of non-regression, which prohibits going back on existing levels of environmental protection.

The preliminary draft also provides for a mechanism to monitor the implementation of the Pact to ensure its effectiveness. This mechanism, which consists of a committee of experts, would be a forum for States to exchange experiences and recommendations in light of national best practices.

== Diplomatic Trajectory ==
The Global Pact draft text was presented for the first time in Paris on 24 June 2017, with attendance from several prominent figures involved in environmental protection, such as Ban Ki-moon, Mary Robinson, Laurent Fabius, Laurence Tubiana, Arnold Schwarzenegger, Anne Hidalgo, Nicolas Hulot, and Manuel Pulgar-Vidal.

On 19 September 2017, French President Emmanuel Macron held a 'Summit on a Global Pact for the Environment' on the margins of the 72nd session of the UN General Assembly in New York to introduce the project to the diplomatic scene. On this occasion, UN Secretary-General António Guterres, UN General Assembly President Miroslav Lajčák, and United Nations Environment Programme (UNEP) Executive Director Erik Solheim expressed their support for the project.

On 10 May 2018, the United Nations General Assembly adopted resolution 72/277 entitled "Towards a Global Pact for the Environment", which formally launched international negotiations on the adoption of such a Pact. It established the negotiations' terms of reference and provided for:

- The presentation of a report by the United Nations Secretary-General to the General Assembly towards the end of 2018, identifying the eventual gaps in international environmental law that the Pact might close.
- The creation of an open-ended working group, open to all State members, tasked with examining this report and discussing whether the issues addressed in the report would be solved by the adoption of the Pact as a new international treaty.

On 5–7 September 2018, the working group held its first organizational session in New York. There, Member states scheduled for three substantive sessions to take place in Nairobi in January, March, and May 2019. This group was chaired by two co-chairs that were nominated by the President of the United Nations General Assembly, Miroslav Lajčák. These were Francisco António Duarte Lopes, Permanent Representative of Portugal and Amal Mudallali, Permanent Representative of Lebanon.

In December 2018, the United Nations Secretary-General published his report on the Global Pact for the Environment. The report, entitled "Gaps in International Environmental Law and Environment-Related Instruments: Towards a Global Pact for the Environment", underlined that the effectiveness of international environmental law could be strengthened by a comprehensive and unifying international instrument that enshrines all the principles of environmental law. Such an instrument "could provide for better harmonization, predictability and certainty".

In June 2019, the working group adopted recommendations that were in net retreat from the original proposals of the co-chairs. Indeed, States effectively opted for adopting a political declaration in 2022 to coincide with the fiftieth anniversary of the Stockholm Conference. These recommendations constitute a setback to the project's initial ambition that aimed for a legally binding international treaty that would enshrine the general principles of environmental law.

On 30 August 2019, the United Nations General Assembly adopted resolution 73/333. This resolution "noted with satisfaction the work of the working group" and "agreed with all its recommendations". It forwarded these recommendations to the United Nations Environment Assembly for its consideration for it to "prepare, at its fifth session, in February 2021, a political declaration for a United Nations high-level meeting, subject to voluntary funding, in the context of the commemoration of the creation of the UNEP by the United Nations Conference on the Human Environment, held in Stockholm from 5 to 16 June 1972."

On 8 May 2020, the President of the United Nations Environment Assembly and the Chair of the Committee of Permanent Representatives nominated two-cofacilitators to lead the negotiations process. These are Saqlain Syedah, from Pakistan, and Ado Lohmus, from Estonia. These co-facilitators leading informal consultations to prepare the work of the Environment Assembly's fifth session in February 2021. In that context, their mandate is to supervise three consultative meetings, the first of which occurred in June 2020. The other two, which were originally scheduled for November 2020 and February 2021, were postponed due to the COVID-19 pandemic. The second consultation took place in November 2021. The third and final session took place on the 27th February 2022, resulting in the adoption of a High-Level Political Declaration in March 2022, in commemoration of the 50th anniversary of the establishment of UNEP and the 1972 Stockholm Declaration. This declaration mentions the right to a healthy environment: "Recognizing that a clean, healthy and sustainable environment is important for the enjoyment of human rights, taking note of Human Rights Council resolution 48/13 entitled "The human right to a clean, healthy and sustainable environment. ”

== Right to a Healthy Environment ==
In September 2020, a small group of states (Costa Rica, Morocco, Slovenia, Switzerland and the Maldives) began discussions to have the right to a healthy environment recognized by the United Nations Human Rights Council.

On October 8, 2021, the Human Rights Council adopted resolution 48/13 by a vote of 43 in favor, none against and 4 abstentions (China, India, Japan, and Russia). This resolution recognizes for the first time at the international level the right to a healthy environment as a human right. It follows an international campaign led by more than a thousand NGOs and fifteen UN agencies.

This resolution also invites the General Assembly of the United Nations in New York to examine the issue.

As of March 2022, this same small group of States (Costa Rica, Morocco, Slovenia, Switzerland and Maldives) initiated discussions so this right could be recognized by the United Nations General Assembly in New York.

On 28 July 2022, the United Nations General Assembly adopted, by 161 votes in favour, 0 against and 8 abstentions (Russia, Belarus, Cambodia, China, Iran, Ethiopia, Kyrgyzstan, Syria), a resolution recognizing the human right to a clean, healthy and sustainable environment. Although General Assembly resolutions are not legally binding, this resolution was welcomed by UN High Commissioner for Human Rights Michelle Bachelet, multiple special rapporteurs and members of some civil society organizations.
