= Last Child in the Woods =

2005 book by Richard Louv

- First edition
- Author: Richard Louv
- Language: English
- Subject: Children and nature
- Publisher: Algonquin Books
- Publication date: 2005
- Publication place: United States
- Media type: Print (Paperback)
- Pages: 390
- ISBN: 978-1-56512-605-3
- OCLC: 183879632
- Dewey Decimal: 155.4/18 22
- LC Class: BF353.5.N37 L68 2008

Last Child in the Woods: Saving Our Children From Nature-Deficit Disorder is a 2005 book by author Richard Louv that documents decreased exposure of children to nature in American society and how this "nature-deficit disorder" harms children and society. The author also suggests solutions to the problems he describes. A revised and expanded edition was published in 2008.

== Synopsis ==
In the book, Louv argues that modern children are increasingly separated from nature compared to previous generations and that direct outdoor experience is essential for healthy development. He draws on research suggesting that reduced exposure to natural environments contributes to behavioral and emotional problems in children and that exposure can be therapeutic for children and adults suffering from traumatic stress, depression, obesity and many other disorders. Louv introduces the term "nature-deficit disorder" to describe the growing disconnection and writes that it affects "health, spiritual well-being, and many other areas, including [people's] ability to feel ultimately alive."

Louv argues imaginative outdoor play have been displaced by organized activities such as sports, electronic media, and parental fears about safety. He attributes these shifts to cultural anxieties, media sensationalism, and restrictions that limit children's access to natural spaces. Louv notes that these government imposed restrictions, such as regulations on treehouse construction and limits that discourage children from roaming in the nearby woods, further reduce opportunities for unstructured outdoor play. Louv argues that classrooms have likewise become increasingly sanitized, with outdoor learning and natural sciences removed or reduced to make room for preparation for standardized testing. Demonstrating the appeal of indoor activities, one fifth grader stated, "I like to play indoors better ’cause that’s where all the electrical outlets are." Louv further asserts that statistical dangers associated with outdoor play are very low and that media sensationalism has fueled disproportionate fears about children's safety.

== Reception ==
The book was on the New York Times Best Seller list for best paper nonfiction. The author received the Audubon Medal "for sounding the alarm about the health and societal costs of children's isolation from the natural world—and for sparking a growing movement to remedy the problem."

During the second Obama administration, Sally Jewell, a CEO of REI and Obama's secretary of the interior, took an REI daypack filled with copies of Louv's book, went to the White House, and handed them out to staff and the President.

== Versions ==
- English: The Last Child in the Woods,
  - Hardcover (April 15, 2005), ISBN 978-1-56512-391-5
  - Paperback Updated and Expanded (April 10, 2008), ISBN 978-1-56512-605-3
  - audio CD: Recorded Books; Unabridged edition (December 20, 2007), ISBN 978-1-4281-6967-8
- Japanese: Anatano Kodomoniwa Shizenga Tarinai, Hardcover (July 20, 2006), ISBN 978-4152087515

== Children & Nature Network ==
The success of Last Child in the Woods inspired the creation of Children & Nature Network co-founded and chaired by the book's author, Richard Louv, to encourage and support the people and organizations working to reconnect children with nature.

== Green Hour ==
Green Hour is an organization that provides information on how to reverse Nature-Deficit Disorder, and encourages parents to let their children explore and reconnect with the outdoors.

== See also ==
- Nature Cat, a TV series inspired by the story
