= Shinrin-yoku =

Form of nature therapy that originated in Japan

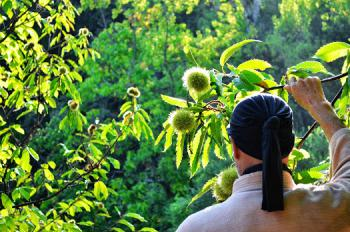
Example of practicing shinrin-yoku

Shinrin-yoku (Japanese: 森林浴, 森林 (shinrin, "forest") + 浴 (yoku, "bath, bathing.")), also known as forest bathing, is a practice or process of therapeutic relaxation where one spends time in a forest or natural atmosphere, focusing on sensory engagement to connect with nature.

The practice has gained popularity in various regions in the United States, particularly in California. Shinrin-yoku can be seen as similar to other adopted east-to-west health trends, such as yoga and meditation, in that it has been linked to numerous health benefits and can be performed solo, guided, and/or with others.

== History ==
=== Antiquity ===
The first works related to sylvotherapy go back to antiquity. According to Pliny the Elder, "[W]oods consisting only of those trees from which pitch and resin are scraped off are very beneficial to consumptives, or to those who cannot convalesce after a long illness, and ... the air in districts so planted is more health-giving than a sea-voyage to Egypt, or than draughts of milk from cattle that have grazed along summer pastures in the mountains."

=== Middle Ages ===
In the Middle Ages, terpenoids present in the forest atmosphere, especially conifers, in the form of oleoresins (these secondary metabolites found in camphor and turpentine, are chemical defences of plants against herbivores) were used to treat certain diseases (analgesic, sedative, bronchodilator, antitussive, anti-inflammatory, antibiotic and relaxing effect).

=== Since the 19th century ===
==== Finland ====
The Finnish Forest Association along with the Finnish Forest Therapy Centre promotes forest therapy and provides organized activities for forest visitors to practice it. These activities focus on well-being and mind and body recovery. Visitors include various groups, companies, and communities.

==== Japan ====
Japan, being two thirds covered in forest, is filled with greenery and a vast diversity of trees. Residing there is the Hokkaido region, Japan's last great wilderness, and the Japanese Alps, filled with mountain ranges and thick pine forests. The term shinrin-yoku was coined in 1982 by Tomohide Akiyama, who was the director of the Japanese Ministry of Agriculture, Forestry and Fisheries. After several studies were conducted in Japan during the 1980s, forest bathing was seen to be an effective therapy method. Akiyama knew of these studies along with the findings that showed the beneficial health effects of the compounds, such as phytoncides, and of the essential oils that certain trees and plants emitted. Thus, he officially put forward shinrin-yoku as a recognized practice, promoting its benefits to the Japanese public and establishing guidelines for its implementation.

Shinrin-yoku was developed as a response to the increasing urbanization and technological advancements in Japan and was put forth to inspire the Japanese public to reconnect with nature within Japan and as a means to protect the forests. It was reasoned that if people spent time in forests and were able to find therapeutic comfort within it, they would want to protect it.

==== South Korea ====
In 2009, the Korea Forest Service opened Saneum National Recreational Forest, the first therapeutic forest. Since then, they have opened more and by 2020, there were 32 therapeutic forests in South Korea.

==== United States ====
The U.S. Forest Service put forth forest therapy where there are certified guides for the Association of Nature and Forest Therapy. These certified guides conduct two hour sessions in Puerto Rico's El Yunque Rainforest where they bring along participants to experience the powerful effect of forest therapy.

== Practice ==
Practicing shinrin-yoku means spending time in nature, amongst the trees and grass, and mindfully engaging within a forest atmosphere or other natural environments. It is usually done by walking through a forest at a slow and gentle pace, without carrying any electronics, and taking the time to soak up the surrounding nature.

It involves using all five senses and letting nature enter through those senses. Some examples of exercising this can include:

- Listening to forest sounds, i.e. birds and insects.
- Touching the ground, the trees, and the leaves.
- Smelling the flowers and other essential oils of the plants and trees.
- Observing the surroundings and scenery.
- Tasting the crispiness of the air while breathing.

== Reported health benefits ==
=== Immune system booster ===
Many experiments have hypothesized the positive effects of shinrin-yoku on the immune system. It was shown that shinrin-yoku was associated with increasing levels of natural killer cells, which are important in combating infection.

=== Mental health and mood improvement ===
Recent studies in Japan and Europe have found short-term reductions in anxiety, depressive mood, and perceived stress after guided forest-therapy walks. Participants often showed improvements on standardized measures such as the Profile of Mood States (POMS) after sessions lasting one to three hours. Researchers suggest that the combined effects of gentle physical activity, multisensory engagement, and distance from urban settings may contribute to these outcomes, although the precise mechanisms remain under investigation. Longer-term effects of forest therapy have also begun to attract research attention. A 2021 study in South Korea reported that participants who attended weekly forest-therapy programs for eight weeks maintained significant reductions in perceived stress and improvements in sleep quality compared with a control group. Similar programs have been evaluated in European contexts, suggesting that repeated exposure to natural environments may enhance the durability of mood-related benefits.

=== Decrease in blood pressure and stress ===
Participants of conducted studies were seen experiencing a decrease in pulse rate, blood pressure, and concentration of the stress hormone cortisol while walking through a forest for even just a few hours. The power of the essential oils emitted within plant life in forests can reduce stress with the decrease in cortisol concentration.

=== Challenging the effects ===
In 1985, French water and forestry engineer Georges Plaisance published a book on the subject, Forêt et santé. However, it is not a scientific publication, but a personal reflection published by a youth publisher.

According to a podcast organized by RTS in 2023, "from a scientific point of view, the understanding of the mechanisms that drive these effects is in its infancy".

According to an article in Le Figaro, the physical activity and relaxation induced by walking would explain these positive effects rather than the environment itself. Some feel that the subject has a strong cultural dimension in Japan, not necessarily reproducible elsewhere.

== See also ==
- ASMR
- Nature therapy
- Therapeutic garden
