= Care farming =

Therapeutic use of farming practices

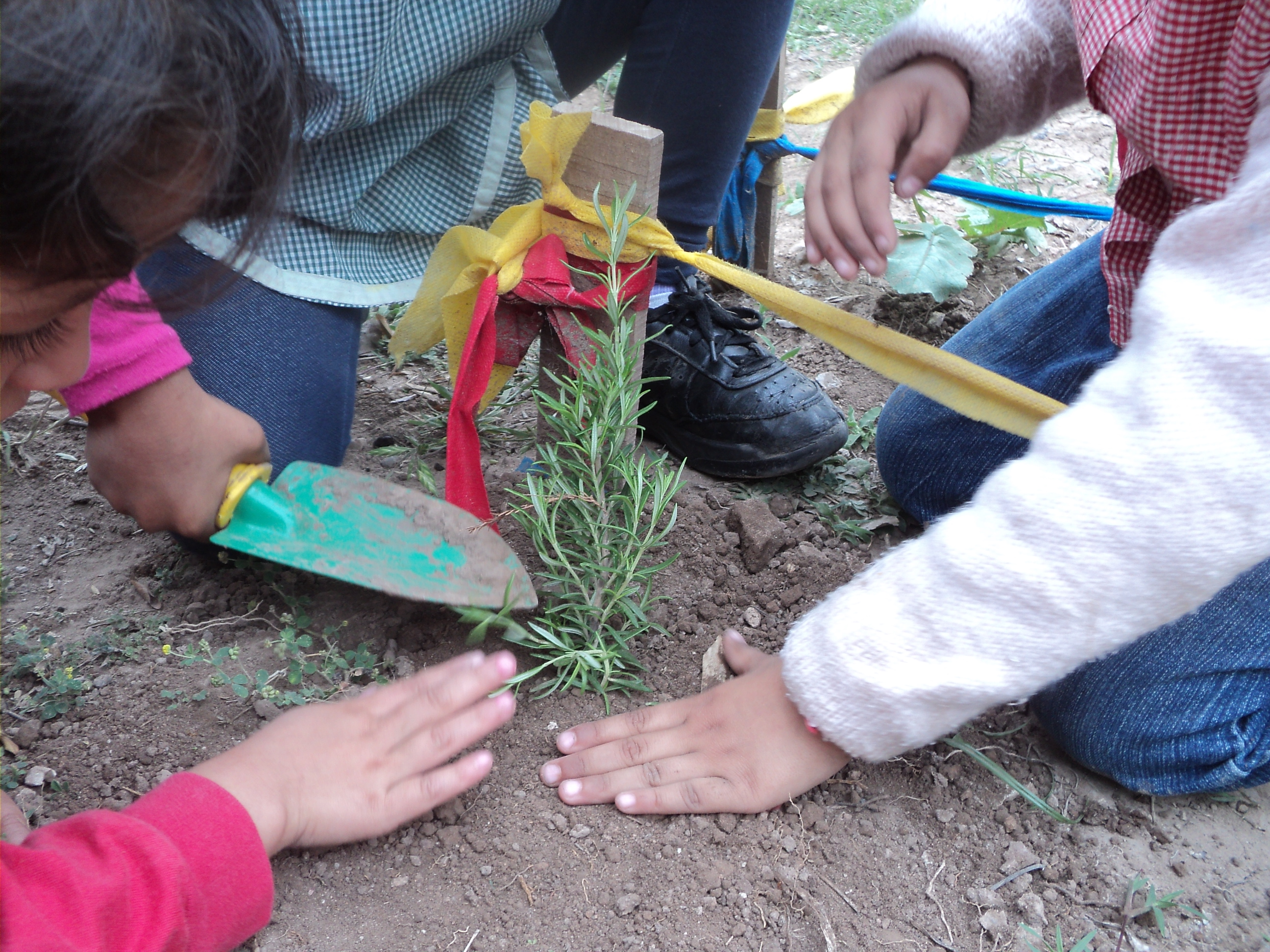
Care farming

Care farming is the use of farming practices for the stated purpose of providing or promoting healing, mental health, social, or educational care services. Convicts may also be required to spend time at care farms. Care farms may provide supervised, structured programs of farming-related activities, including animal husbandry, crop and vegetable production and woodland management.

== Effectiveness ==
Working on a care farm can help adult offenders gain new skills. In nineteenth century Scotland, teaching farming skills to young offenders was tried as a means of reducing recidivism and promoting honest labour. The farm school at Riddrie admitted (or received) 158 boys between 1866 and 1868. Of these, 64 were subsequently described as "doing well", meaning they were considered to be living respectable and productive lives. The Riddrie experiment ended because of unrelated financial issues in 1871. More studies on care farming are desirable to determine whether it can be an alternative or adjunct therapy for people with certain mental illnesses (such as anxiety or depression).

Care farming may also benefit farm animals, although evidence is limited. For example, greater exposure to humans has the potential to reduce some of the stresses caused by typical agricultural practices. Having more people see the animals may increase the detection of parasites or other animal health issues.

== History ==
Benjamin Rush (1746–1813) published 5 books in a series of Medical Inquiries and Observations, the last being concerned with The Diseases of The Mind (1812). In this volume, the practice of horticulture is mentioned twice.

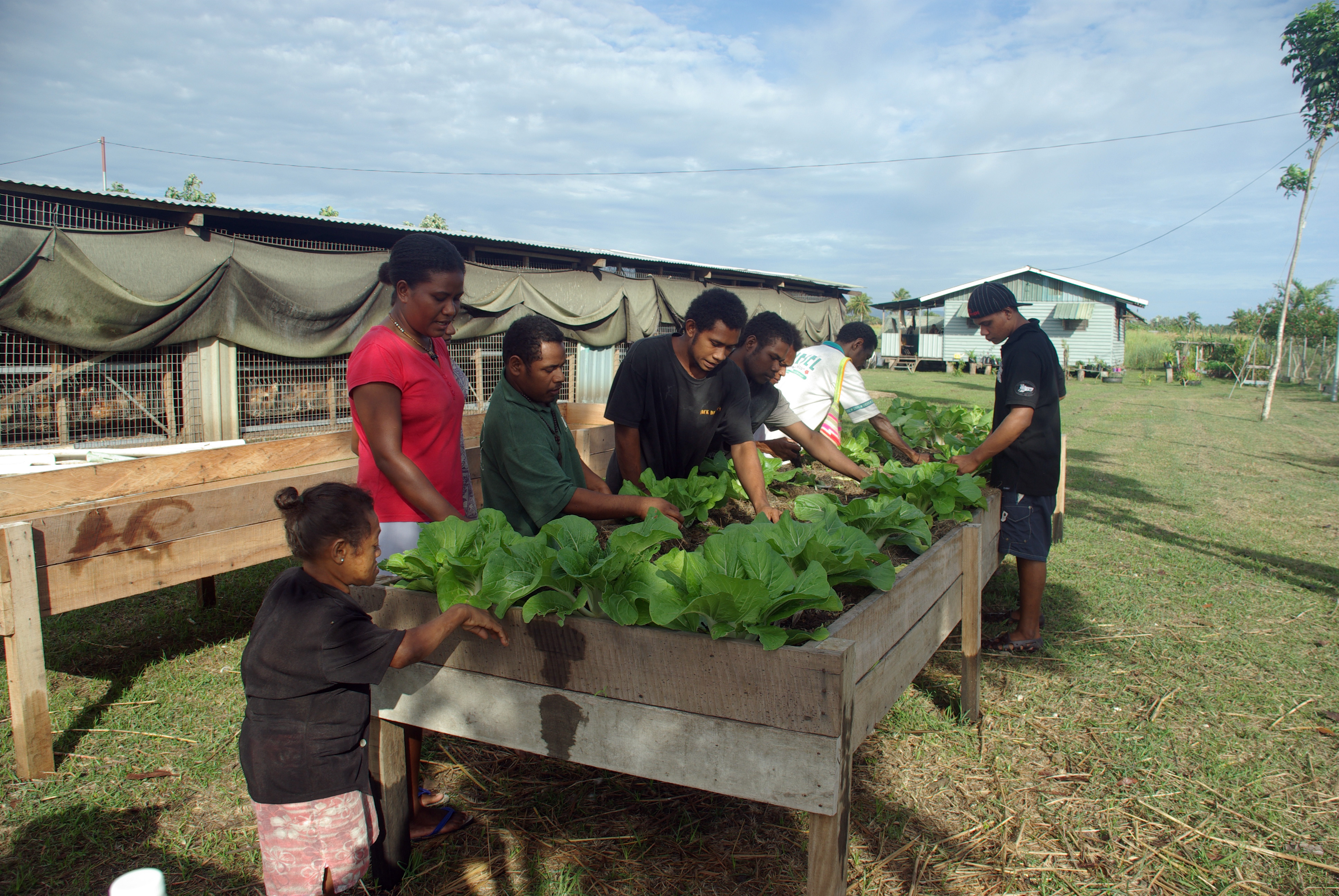
Students learn how to weed in specially designed wheelchair accessible garden beds.

== See also ==
- Animal-assisted therapy
- Ecopsychology
- Green exercise
- Horticultural therapy
- Prison farm
