= Richard Louv =

American journalist, author (born 1949)

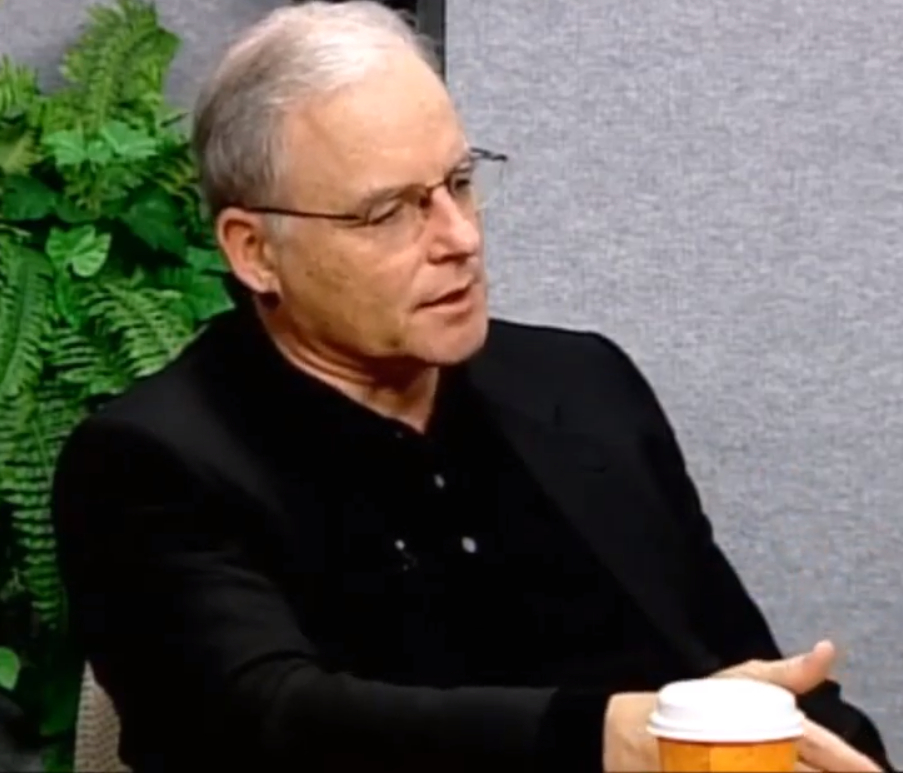
- Born: 1949 (age 76–77)
- Occupations: Author, journalist
- Notable work: Last Child in the Woods
- Awards: Honorable John C. Pritzlaff Conservation Award (2020)

Richard Louv (born 1949) is an American non-fiction author and journalist. He is best known for his seventh book, Last Child in the Woods: Saving Our Children From Nature-Deficit Disorder (first published in 2005 by Algonquin Books of Chapel Hill), which investigates the relationship of children and the natural world in current and historical contexts. Louv created the term "nature-deficit disorder" to describe possible negative consequences to individual health and the social fabric as children move indoors and away from physical contact with the natural world, particularly unstructured, solitary experience. Louv cites research pointing to attention disorders, obesity, a dampening of creativity and depression as problems associated with a nature-deficient childhood. He amassed information on the subject from practitioners of many disciplines to make his case and is commonly credited with helping to inspire an international movement to reintroduce children to nature.

== Career ==
Louv was a columnist for The San Diego Union-Tribune newspaper between 1984 and 2007, its last column titled "The Future’s Edge." His essays discuss the division of nature and humanity. He has been a columnist and member of the editorial advisory board for Parents magazine and a Ford Foundation Leadership for a Changing World award program adviser. He also was an adviser for the National Scientific Council on the Developing Child. He currently is honorary co-chair of The National Forum on Children and Nature The National Forum on Children and Nature | The Conservation Fund, which is co-chaired by four state governors, a visiting scholar at Clemson University, and chairman and co-founder of the Children & Nature Network, a non-profit organization.

Louv's latest book, Noticing: Intimate Encounters With the Natural World, was released by Algonquin Books in June 2026. He described it, in a Psychology Today article, as "a personal extension of the work I’ve been doing for two decades," including how he developed the term "Nature-Deficit Disorder." "My book Last Child in the Woods introduced the term Nature-Deficit Disorder, not as a known medical diagnosis but as a beginning language to help us talk about the widening divide between humans and the rest of the natural world," he said.

=== Awards ===
In May 2026, the Outdoor Recreation Roundtable in Washington, D.C., at its inaugural two-day national executive forum on health and outdoor recreation, awarded Louv its Lifetime Achievement Award.

In 2008, the National Audubon Society awarded Louv its highest honor, the Audubon Medal. He was the 2007 recipient of Clemson University's Cox Award for "sustained achievement in public service.". In 2008, he received the Paul K. Petzoldt Award from the Wilderness Education Association. The U.S. Department of the Interior, and associations such as the Sierra Club, The Trust for Public Land, and The Nature Conservancy, have cited Louv's book.

== Bibliography ==
- America II (Penguin, 1983)
- Childhood's Future (Anchor Books, 1993)
- 101 Things You Can Do for Our Children's Future (Anchor, 1994)
- FatherLove (Pocket Books, 1994)
- The Web of Life (Conari Press, 1996)
- Fly-Fishing for Sharks: An American Journey (Simon & Schuster, 2000)
- Last Child in the Woods: Saving Our Children From Nature-Deficit Disorder (Algonquin Books of Chapel Hill, 2005)
- The Nature Principle: Human Restoration and the End of Nature-Deficit Disorder (Algonquin Books, 2011)
- Vitamin N: The Essential Guide to a Nature-Rich Life (Algonquin Books, 2016)
- Our Wild Calling: How Connecting with Animals Can Transform Our Lives — and Save Theirs (Workman, 2019)
- Noticing: Intimate Encounters With the Natural World (Algonquin Books, 2026)
