= Right to a healthy environment in Tunisia =

Tunisian rights for a healthy environment

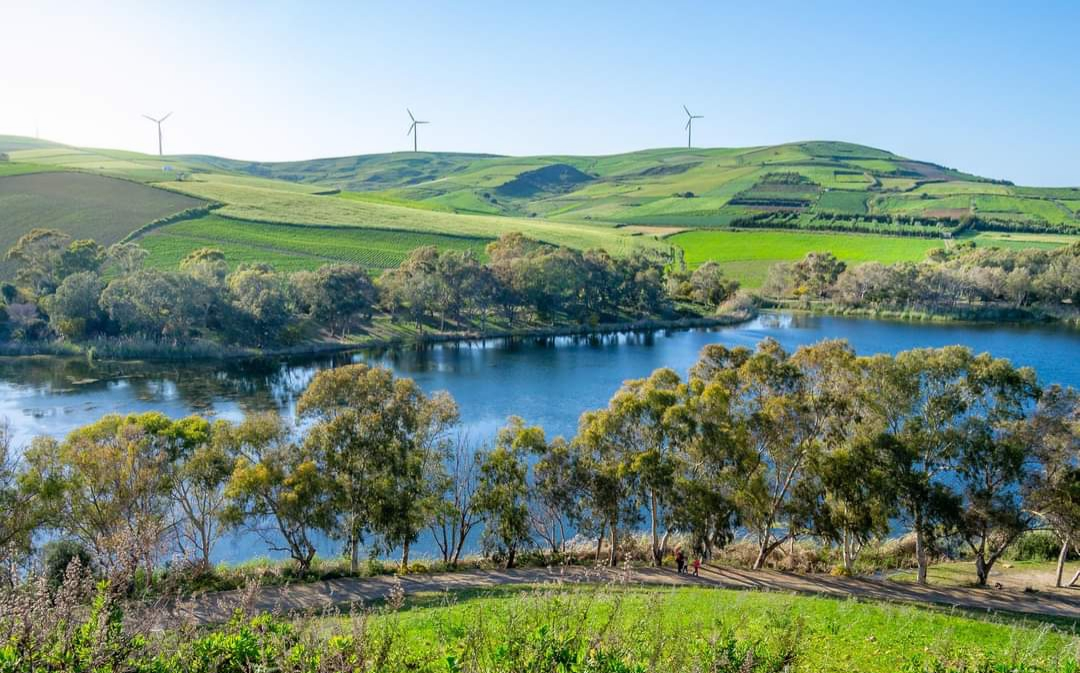
Wind farm in Tunisia

The "right to a healthy environment" in Tunisia is a human right guaranteed mainly by the Tunisian Constitution of 2014 but also by other laws and international conventions.

== Legal framework ==
=== Tunisian Constitution ===
The right to a healthy environment in Tunisia is guaranteed by the Tunisian Constitution of 2014, particularly through the article 45, which states: "The state guarantees the right to a healthy and balanced environment and the right to participate in the protection of the climate. The state shall provide the necessary means to eradicate pollution of the environment".

The article 12 from the same constitution states also that the state "shall seek to achieve social justice, sustainable development" and "to exploit natural resources in the most efficient way".

The constitution defines a list of independent constitutional bodies that act in support of democracy and enjoy a legal personality and financial and administrative independence. Among these constitutional bodies, one is dedicated to sustainable development and the rights of future generations and shall be consulted on draft laws related to economic, social and environmental issues, as well as development plans.

=== International Conventions ===
The Tunisian State has ratified several multilateral and bilateral conventions related to environment protection and pollution prevention. Among these conventions:

- United Nations Convention to Combat Desertification adopted on 17 June 1994 (ratified locally by the law n°95‐52 on 19 June 1995);
- London Convention on the Prevention of Marine Pollution by Dumping of Wastes and Other Matter adopted on 29 December 1972 (ratified locally by the law n°76‐17 on 21 January 1976);
- Barcelona Convention for the Protection of the Marine Environment and the Coastal Region of the Mediterranean adopted on 16 February 1976 (ratified locally by the law n°77‐29 on 25 May 1977 and amended by the law n°98‐15 on 23 February 1998).
