= Nature prescription =

A nature prescription is given to patients as part of nature therapy. These prescriptions cannot be filled at pharmacies because nature is not a literal medication. According to a 2023 systemic review, nature prescriptions have a positive correlation with lower systolic blood pressure, decreased depression and anxiety symptoms, and increased the amount of steps taken on a daily basis. The same review found that these prescriptions did not increase the amount of moderate physical activity and noted that while mental health symptoms benefitted from walking, they improved the most when the patient was also given other interventions.

== Programs ==
In 2013, ParksRx became the first nature prescription program in the United States. As of 2020, there are about 75 programs to provide nature prescriptions in the United States which have varying requirements. Some programs are used to promote gardening. The use of such prescriptions is encouraged by the National Physical Activity Plan.

In Canada, a national program to provide nature prescriptions exists, with approximately 30,000 prescriptions being written each month. This program began in British Columbia in 2020. The prescriptions are used to allow patients to visit conservation areas partnered with the PaRx organization. Some partners are Conservation Halton, Parks Canada, and the Toronto Zoo. Most prescriptions are given to patients with mental health issues. In addition to improving health, the program is intended to promote environmentalism.

In Scotland, nature prescriptions started being written in 2017. The program is partnered with the Royal Society for the Protection of Birds.

== See also ==
- Nature deficit disorder
