= Nature therapy =

Health practice

Nature therapy, sometimes referred to as ecotherapy, grounding, or earthing, is a practice that describes a broad group of techniques or treatments using nature to improve mental or physical health. Various types of nature therapy include forest therapy, forest bathing, shinrin-yoku, and Sami Lok. Spending time in nature has various physiological benefits such as relaxation and stress reduction. Additionally, it can enhance cardiovascular health and reduce risks of high blood pressure.

Recent studies also emphasized its role in supporting mental well-being by improving attention, emotional balance, and overall mood stability.

These effects are usually linked to the body's natural stress recovery process, in which contact with nature decreases cortisol levels and heart rate.

== History ==
Scientists in the 1950s looked into the reasons humans chose to spend time in nature. "Forest bathing" and Shrinrin-yoku was popularized in Japan by the former head of the Japanese Ministry of Agriculture, Forestry, and Fisheries, Tomohide Akiyama, in 1982 to encourage more people to visit forests. This initiative was created to promote relaxation and reduce stress during the time of rapid industrialization.

Beginning in 2005, Qing Li ran a series of small, random controlled trials that reported that spending a few hours/day walking in a forest over several days increased the number of natural killer cells, by roughly 50 percent, while levels of perforin, granzymes, and granulysin, had all risen sharply. The increased levels were measured to have persisted from 7-30 days thereafter. Repeating the experiment in an urban area had no such effects. He claimed that airborne phytoncides produced by trees were responsible.

Countries including Finland and South Korea later created national programs highlighting preventative and therapeutic health benefits tied to regular time in nature.

== Health effects ==
=== Mood ===
Nature therapy is associated with improving mood. Even a small amount of interaction with nature, such as having a tree outside one's home in urban communities, is linked to human wellbeing and promote mental health. This may be due to aesthetic reasons, encouragement of physical activity, or general feelings of connection to nature, where the increased proximity to nature creates higher feelings of connectivity.

Studies link sounds considered natural, like flowing water, and birdsong to reduced blood pressure, a calmer heart rate, and a better mood.

Forest therapy has been linked to some physiological benefits as indicated by neuroimaging and the profile of mood states psychological test.

=== Stress ===
Interaction with nature is associated with lower stress and depressive symptoms. Forest therapy might help stress management for all age groups.

A 2025 literature review affirmed that forest bathing, outdoor learning, and other forest-based practices are related to decreased stress levels and emotional satisfaction in several different demographic groups.

Research additionally implies that children better manage stress, and develop more efficient coping skills by participating in nature-based programs.

=== Depression ===
Social horticulture could help with depression and other mental health problems of PTSD, abuse, lonely elderly people, drug or alcohol addicts, blind people, and other people with special needs. Nature therapy could also improve self-management, self-esteem, social relations and skills, socio-political awareness and employability.

Sounds of nature alone can be enough to affect relaxation and enhance positive emotions while reducing negative emotions, including depression and anger. Nature can lower stress levels and aid in recovery for diastolic and systolic blood pressures.

A 2025 literature review reported that consistent participation in nature-based activities can lead to better and more persistent psychological benefits in comparison to brief exposure.

=== Other possible benefits ===
Nature therapy could help with general medical recovery, pain reduction, attention deficit/hyperactivity disorder, dementia, obesity, and vitamin D deficiency. Interactions with nature environments enhance social connections, stewardship, sense of place, and increase environmental participation. Connecting with nature also addresses needs such as intellectual capacity, emotional bonding, creativity, and imagination.

Research also suggests that childhood experience in nature are crucial for children in their daily lives as it contributes to several developmental outcomes and various domains of their well-being. Essentially, these experiences also foster an intrinsic care for nature. Studies suggest that the mental health benefits of nature may depend on how different cultures understand and value the human relationship with nature, meaning the effects can vary across communities.

Spending time outdoors can also help people feel more connected to their community, especially when activities are done in shared public spaces or group programs.

Nature therapy is relatively accessible and low-cost, since it can be practiced in parks, community gardens, or other public outdoor spaces without equipment.

== Criticism ==
Recent reviews have noted that results often vary depending on study design and population, which makes it difficult to measure long-term effects of nature-based therapies with consistency.

A 2012 systematic review study showed inconclusive results related to the methodology used in studies. Spending time in forests demonstrated positive health effects, but not enough to generate clinical practice guidelines or demonstrate causality.

Other scholars have claimed that emotional or cultural meanings of nature are emphasized more than scientific evidence and that time spent in nature as a form of regenerative therapy is personal and unpredictable.

Two 2025 reviews called for more/larger randomized controlled studies to confirm these effects.

A 2024 review claimed that many studies rely on self-reported feelings instead of objective measurements.

== Governmental support and professionalization ==
In Finland, researchers recommend spending about five hours a month in nature as a preventative health measure, based on studies suggesting that regular outdoor time. South Korea's approach is more therapeutic, focusing on structured nature-based programs that support firefighters with post-traumatic stress disorder. Canada uses a medical-prescription model, where physicians can formally prescribe "nature" to encourage patients to spend more time outdoors. Starting in 2019, general practitioners in the United Kingdom began referring patients to a program called Dose of Nature, funded by the National Health Service, local governments and foundations. It claimed a recovery rate of 64% for its first 1500 patients, compared to a 50% rate for talk therapy and a higher improvement rate.

Several national health agencies have also begun funding research to test how structured nature-based programs can support public health, especially for stress related conditions.

Some governments have partnered with environmental organizations to create certified training for nature-therapy practitioners.

Some governments have expanded training programs for teachers and youth workers to integrate nature-based practices into educational and community settings.

== See also ==
- Biophilia hypothesis
- Eco-anxiety
- Ecopsychology
- Environmental psychology
- Nature deficit disorder
- Nature prescription
- Plant blindness
- Wilderness therapy
