= Plant blindness =

Human tendency to ignore plants

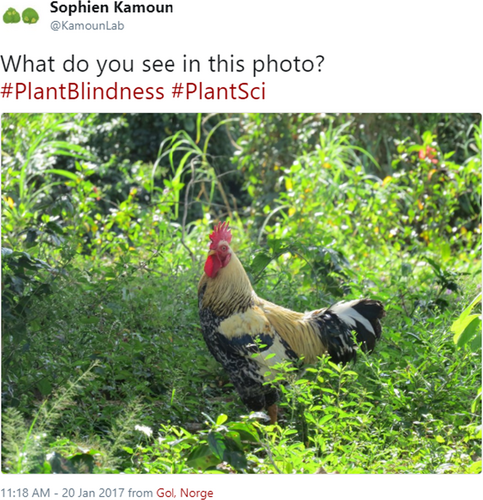
Tweet from Tunisian biologist Sophien Kamoun

Plant blindness, plant awareness disparity (PAD) or lack of plant awareness is a proposed form of cognitive bias which, in its broadest meaning, is a human tendency to ignore plant species. This includes such phenomena as not noticing plants in the surrounding environment, not recognizing the importance of plant life to the whole biosphere and to human affairs, a philosophical view of plants as an inferior form of life to animals, and the inability to appreciate the unique features or aesthetics of plants. Related terms include plant‐neglect, zoo-centrism, zoo‐chauvinism, or a lack of plant literacy.

The term plant blindness was coined by the botanist educators J. H. Wandersee and E. E. Schussler in their 1999 publication 'Preventing Plant Blindness'. Scientists have suggested that the reason some people do not notice plants is because plants are stationary and similarly coloured, although other research has suggested that plant blindness is affected by cultural practices. A 2014 study in the United States looked at how plants and animals are perceived using "attentional blink" (the ability to notice one of two rapidly presented images). The study showed that participants were more accurate in detecting animals in images, rather than plants. The researchers also suggested possible strategies for characterizing and overcoming zoo-centrism.

According to the BBC journalist Christine Ro, plant blindness is potentially linked to nature deficit disorder, which she construes is causing what she claims is reduced funding and fewer classes for botany.

== Causes ==
Two main avenues through which plant blindness has arisen have been suggested: human nature, and culture.

=== Human nature ===
The first, human nature, encompasses the idea that human brain chemistry and visual processing systems are inherently biased to ignore plants in the environment. Studies have shown that human visual systems can not effectively process all the information that is seen. Thus, research suggests that priority is given to variable colors, movement, and familiar objects in order to most effectively detect threats and potential food sources. As plants do not often fit this criterion, many scientists think the human brain tends not to fully process their visual presence. For instance, plants tend to be overlooked because, unlike animals which actively hunt or attack, they generally present only passive or defensive threats, such as thorns or toxins. Additionally, primates have been shown to have a preference for organisms that behave similarly to their own species. As plants behave very differently than humans, this also suggests that there is an intrinsic component to plant blindness.

=== Culture ===
Culture has also been shown to play an important role in the establishment of plant blindness in a society. Many believe that evidence for this is found in the decreased level of plant blindness in certain communities. For example, in certain Indian and indigenous communities, plants are highly valued for their role in religion, medicine, and mythology.

In societies where plant blindness is prevalent, several cultural mechanisms are considered to contribute to the phenomenon. Zoo-centric education is considered to be one main cause. In the United States, high school biology textbooks devote only 15% of their content to plants. In many societies, there is not thought to be a comprehensive understanding among citizens of the complexity behind plants' behaviors, reactions, and movements. The pervasive misunderstanding of evolution as a linear mechanism where humans are most evolved and plants are least evolved, rather than as a complex, non-hierarchical process, may also cultivate plant blindness. Plant blindness is also partially attributed to increased urbanization, which has led to nature-deficit disorder and the decrease in prominence of plants' roles in everyday life. Finally, the concept that animals are more important than plants is reinforced through cultural over-representation of animals, such as in mascots.

== Potential effects ==
Several concerns exist regarding the potential effects of plant blindness. Most notably, plant blindness may lead to less funding being available for plant conservation efforts. Plants make up 57% of the endangered species list, while only 3.9% of funding for endangered species is allotted to them.

Laws do not protect endangered plants as well as endangered animals. Endangered plants on Federal land are protected, but landowners can destroy them on their private property. Many states have no state level laws to protect endangered plants.

Plant blindness is also thought to have led to a deficit in plant science research and education. Plant science research has been defunded, interest in botany majors has decreased, and plant biology courses have been terminated in recent years. Yet, this plant research is believed to be critical for medicinal and agricultural advancement.

== Efforts to combat plant blindness ==
Several methods have been proposed to combat plant blindness and efforts are on-going. The most prominent campaign addressing this issue is called Prevent Plant Blindness and was created by Wandersee and Schussler, the researchers who coined this term. This campaign uses three main types of advocacy: a classroom poster which has been distributed to 20,000 teachers and endorsed by the Botanical Society of America, a children's mystery picture book about a plant, entitled Lost Plant!, and promotion of plant-growing education, including school-gardens.

Several other suggestions to address the cultural component of plant blindness have also been proposed. Research has shown that creative activities involving plants, such as storytelling, art, and role-playing can help to strengthen children's relationships to plants. Increasing the representation of plants in science education textbooks, specifically those for high school biology has also been encouraged. Spreading awareness about plant blindness may help reduce it, as the first step in reducing one's biases is thought to be acknowledging them. Citizen science projects involving plants, such as TreeVersity, attempt to help non-botanists see plants in more variable and frequent ways. Plant representation in art and in fictional characters, such as Groot, is considered to be a part of the solution, as well as ensuring plant education employs best practices. Particularly, it has been suggested that plant education should employ constructivist principles, active learning, and multimedia instruction. Finally, plant activists suggest that humans should be considered as a part of the natural system, rather than outside and above it.

== Disagreement about the term ==
Some disagree with the use of this term, asserting that human bias against groups of species extends to all organisms without backbones and human-like eyes. Much of the biodiversity on Earth is found in insects, such as beetles, yet few insects are represented in biology education and in media. Thus, some argue that this phenomenon is more accurately the tendency of humans to ignore everything except vertebrates, not just plants.

Others take issue with the name of the phenomenon, as they consider the use of a disability, blindness, inappropriate as a descriptor of a negative trait and have suggested the terms plant awareness disparity (PAD) or lack of plant awareness

== See also ==
- Speciesism
- Zoocentrism (disambiguation)
