= Nature deficit disorder =

Proposed medical condition resulting from insufficient contact with nature

Nature-deficit disorder is a proposed set of behavioral problems that result when humans, especially children, spend less time outdoors. This putative condition is not recognized in standard medical manuals for mental disorders, such as the ICD-10 or the DSM-5.

== History ==
This term was coined by author Richard Louv in 2005. Louv claimed that the word "disorder" did not imply a medical condition but was rather a metaphor to describe the health costs of alienation from nature. He cited parental fears and a lack of access to natural landscapes as causes for the condition.

In the USA, the Children & Nature Network was co-founded by Louv to support people and organizations that work to reconnect children with nature. The No Child Left Inside movement has a similar mission and a presence in some US states.

In Colombia, OpEPA (Organización para la Educación y Protección Ambiental), founded in 1998, works to reconnect children and youth to nature so they can act with environmental responsibility.

== Proposed effects and causes ==
Nature-deficit disorder is unrecognized by most medical institutions. Some preliminary research shows that lack of time outdoors does have negative effects on children's mental well-being.

Research on the impact of natural environments, particularly the concept of urban green space, has shown certain supporting claims:

- A study on Italian undergraduate students showed how mental fatigue can be alleviated quicker by exposure to natural environments.
- In Edinburgh, a survey found that more exposure to green space helps increase self-esteem in young children.
- A study in the Netherlands found a correlation between urbanization and various mental and physical health issues.

Richard Louv has proposed certain causes for the putative condition of nature deficit disorder:

- Parents keeping children indoors in order to protect them from "stranger danger", thus disrupting their connections to nature.
- Loss of direct access to natural landscapes, with restricted areas and "do not walk off the trail" signs in parks and nature reserves. Louv argues that such protections harm children's relationships with nature and affect their "eco-cultural" identities.

Research in the USA found that redlining has tended to limit the access of low-income and marginalized communities to green space. One study suggested additional exposure of these groups to the proposed nature-deficit disorder.

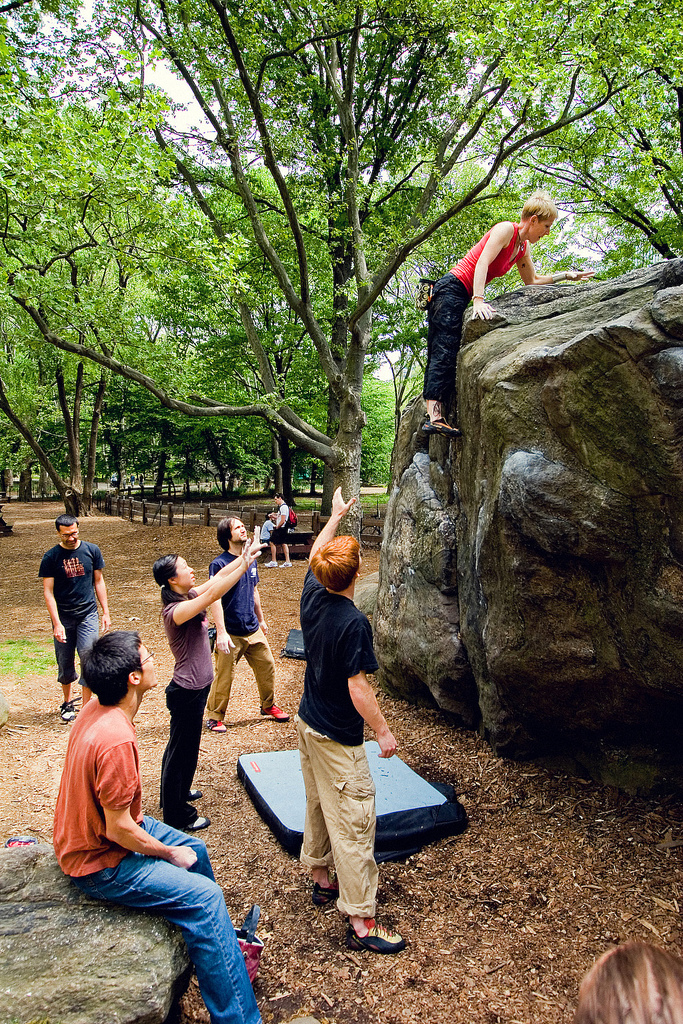
Bouldering site in urban park

== Reception ==
Elizabeth Dickinson, professor of business communication at the University of North Carolina at Chapel Hill, described the condition as "a misdiagnosis—a problematic contemporary environmental discourse that can obscure and mistreat the problem". She suggested that the disorder arises not from children's access to the outdoors but rather from adults' "psyche and dysfunctional cultural practices". Dickinson noted that humanity's alienation from nature has occurred gradually rather than recently, that people can idealize their childhoods, and that nature education might include emotional aspects alongside science.

Research has linked adequate access to greenspace with a range of health benefits, though a review of the literature found little primary research on nature-deficit disorder in Latino communities specifically.

== See also ==
- Biophilia hypothesis
- Ecopsychology
- Environmental psychology
- Nature prescription
- Plant blindness
- Wilderness therapy
