= 2025 in Bermuda =

- Decades: 2000s; 2010s; 2020s
- See also: Other events of 2025; Timeline of Bermuda history

Events in the year 2025 in Bermuda.

== Incumbents ==
- Monarch: Charles III
- Governor: Rena Lalgie (until 20 January); Tom Oppenheim (acting, until 23 January); Andrew Murdoch (since 23 January)
- Premier: Edward David Burt

== Holidays ==
- 1 January – New Year's Day
- 18 April – Good Friday
- 23 May – Bermuda Day
- 16 June – National Heroes Day
- 31 July – Emancipation Day
- 1 August – Mary Prince Day
- 1 September – Labour Day
- 11 November – Remembrance Day
- 25 December – Christmas Day
- 26 December – Boxing Day

== Events ==
- 1 January – The corporate income tax law takes effect.
- 16 January–16 February – Bermuda Restaurant Weeks.
- 17–19 January – The Chubb Bermuda Triangle Challenge.
- 1 February 2025 – The Trademarks Act 2023 comes into effect.
- 10–12 March – The 2025 Bermuda Risk Summit (for Reinsurance professionals) is held at the Hamilton Princess & Beach Club.
- 3 April – Nonstop flights from Bermuda to Bradley International Airport commence.
- 11 April – Direct flights from Bermuda to Raleigh, North Carolina are inaugurated by BermudAir.
- 29 May–5 June – 75th Anniversary Commemoration of the Closure of the Royal Naval Dockyard.

== See also ==
- List of years in Bermuda
- 2025 Atlantic hurricane season
- 2025 in the Caribbean
- 2025 in the environment
