= 2026 in Bermuda =

- Decades: 2000s; 2010s; 2020s
- See also: Other events of 2026; Timeline of Bermuda history

Events in the year 2026 in Bermuda.

== Incumbents ==
- Monarch: Charles III
- Governor: Andrew Murdoch
- Premier: Edward David Burt

== Holidays ==
- 1 January – New Year's Day
- 18 April – Good Friday
- 23 May – Bermuda Day
- 16 June – National Heroes Day
- 31 July – Emancipation Day
- 1 August – Mary Prince Day
- 1 September – Labour Day
- 11 November – Remembrance Day
- 25 December – Christmas Day
- 26 December – Boxing Day

== Deaths ==
- 4 June – John Swan, 90, premier (1982–1995).
- 10 November – David B. Wingate, 91, ornithologist and naturalist.

== See also ==
- List of years in Bermuda
- 2026 Atlantic hurricane season
- 2026 in the Caribbean
- 2026 in the environment
