= 2024 in Bermuda =

- Decades: 2000s; 2010s; 2020s
- See also: Other events of 2024; Timeline of Bermuda history

Events in the year 2024 in Bermuda.

== Incumbents ==
- Monarch: Charles III
- Governor: Rena Lalgie
- Premier: Edward David Burt

== Holidays ==
- 1 January – New Year's Day
- 29 March – Good Friday
- 24 May - Bermuda Day
- 17 June – National Heroes Day
- 1 August – Emancipation Day
- 2 August – Mary Prince Day
- 2 September – Labour Day
- 11 November – Remembrance Day
- 25 December – Christmas Day
- 26 December – Boxing Day

== See also ==
- List of years in Bermuda
- 2024 Atlantic hurricane season
- 2024 in the Caribbean
