= 2025 in the environment =

This is an article of notable issues relating to the terrestrial environment of Earth in 2025. They relate to environmental events such as natural disasters, environmental sciences such as ecology and geoscience with a known relevance to contemporary influence of humanity on Earth, environmental law, conservation, environmentalism with major worldwide impact and environmental issues.

== Events ==
Date / period	Type of event	Event	Topics	Image	Ref.
January 7–January 31	wildfire	January 2025 Southern California wildfires: Palisades Fire; Eaton Fire	[climate change]		
January 14	protected area establishment	Sáttítla Highlands National Monument is established	[conservation]		
January 14	protected area establishment	Chuckwalla National Monument is established	[conservation]		
January 22	legal case	Greenpeace v State of the Netherlands	[environmental law]		
January 30	water release	2025 water release from Lake Kaweah and Lake Success			
February 18	environmental disaster	2025 Sino-Metals Leach Zambia dam disaster	[pollution]		
March 7	protest	Stand Up for Science 2025	[environmental movements]		
May 28	legal case	Lliuya v RWE AG	[environmental law], [ climate change]		

== See also ==
=== General ===
- 2020s in environmental history
- 2025 in Bermuda
- 2025 in climate change
- Green recovery
- 2025 in space
- List of environmental issues
- List of years in the environment
- Outline of environmental studies

=== Natural environment ===
- List of large earthquakes in the 21st century
- List of volcanic eruptions in the 21st century
- Lists of extinct animals § Recent extinction
- Category:Species described in 2025
- Category:Protected areas established in 2025

=== Artificial developments ===
- Timeline of sustainable energy research 2020 to the present
- 2025 in rail transport
- Human impact on the environment
- Disaster response
