= 2018 in Bermuda =

Events in the year 2018 in Bermuda.

== Incumbents ==
- Monarch: Elizabeth II
- Governor: John Rankin
- Premier: Edward David Burt

== Events ==
=== Sports ===
- 9 to 25 February – Bermuda participated at the 2018 Winter Olympics in PyeongChang, South Korea, with 1 competitor in 1 sport (cross-country skiing).

== Deaths ==
- 9 April – Ira Philip, writer and politician (b. 1925).
