= Lliuya v RWE AG =

Climate change litigation case

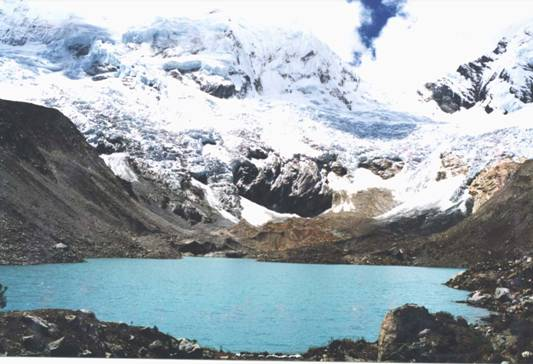
- Court: Oberlandesgericht Hamm

Case history
- Prior action: (2015) Case No. 2 O 285/15

Keywords
- Tort, climate damage, glacier, nuisance

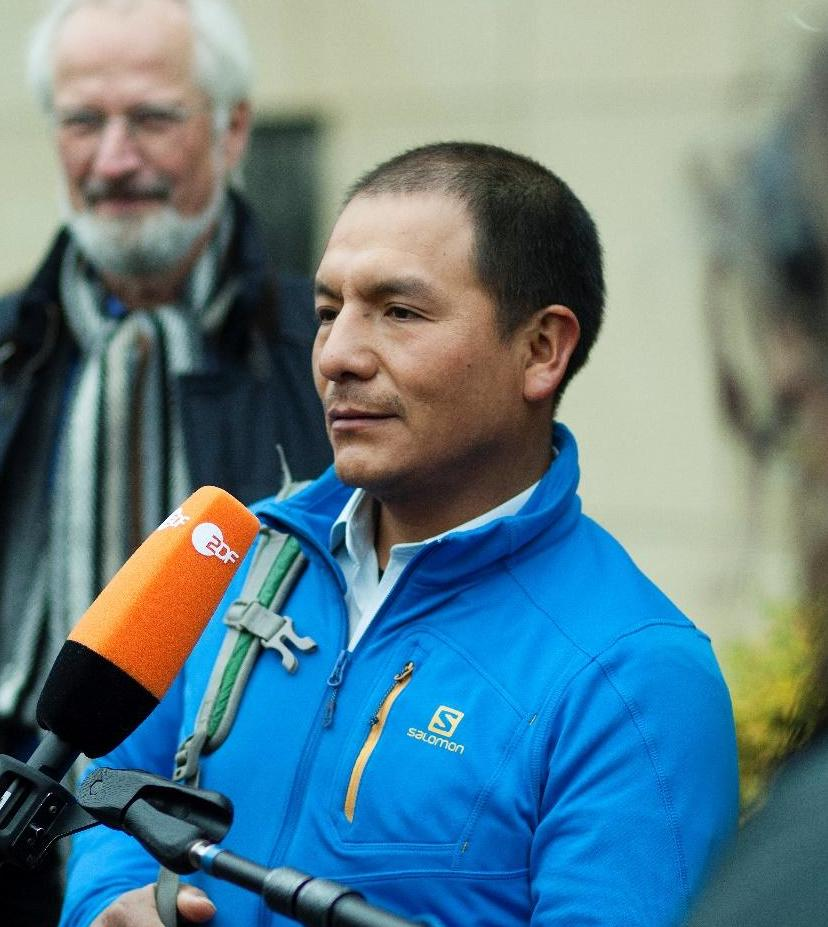
Saúl Luciano Lliuya in 2016

Lliuya v RWE AG (2025) Case No. 2 O 285/15 (Essen Oberlandesgericht) was a German tort law and climate litigation case. Saúl Luciano Lliuya initiated the suit, concerning liability for climate damage in Peru from a melting glacier, against Germany's largest coal burning power company, RWE, which had caused approximately 0.47% of all historic greenhouse gas emissions. If successful, it would have established legal precedent that companies contributing to climate change were liable for damages caused by climate change. It was appealed in the Higher Regional Court in Hamm, North Rhine-Westphalia. On 28 May 2025, the court rejected Luciano Lliuya's lawsuit.

== Facts ==
Saúl Luciano Lliuya, a Peruvian farmer from Huaraz, population 120,000, claimed against RWE, Germany's largest electric company, that it knowingly contributed to climate damage by emitting greenhouse gases, and was partly responsible for melting mountain glaciers near his town. This caused Palcacocha, a nearby glacial lake, to increase in size since 1975, creating a major flood risk to the town. If a large avalanche were to fall into the lake, the resulting wave would reach 70 feet over the top of the moraine, and the flood of nearly 2 million cubic meters of water would reach Huaraz within an hour. The emissions were a nuisance under the German Civil Code, BGB §1004, and RWE is requested should reimburse a portion of costs incurred to establish flood protection, namely 0.47% of total cost, given RWE's annual contribution to GHG emissions. Specifically, as the flood protection project would cost US$4 million, RWE is requested to pay $20,000.

== Judgment ==
=== State Court ===
The Essen Landesgericht dismissed Lliuya's claim for an injunction and damages. It stated that it could not provide effective redress, because Lliuya's situation would be the same even if RWE stopped emitting and there was no 'linear causal chain' within the complex causal relationship between particular emissions and climate change impacts. RWE was not a 'disturber by conduct' under BGB §1004, and given the number of contributors to climate change, attributing individual damage to specific actors was impossible.

=== Upper State Court ===
The Oberlandesgericht Hamm, on 30 November 2017, said the claim was admissible. It would go to evidential phase on whether Lliuya's home is (a) threatened by floods or mudslides (b) how RWE contributed. It will review expert opinion on RWE CO_{2} emissions, contribution and impact on the glacier.

On 17 March 2025 the case resumed at the Higher Regional Court in Hamm, North Rhine-Westphalia. The hearings determined what evidence will be permissible in the final trial, which will rule on whether RWE – which has never operated in Peru – can be held liable for damages. RWE continues to deny legal responsibility, arguing that climate change is a global issue caused by many contributors.

On 28 May 2025, the court rejected Lliuya's lawsuit.

== Significance ==
This was the first case to potentially hold fossil fuel corporations directly responsible in tort for the damage they knowingly cause through releasing greenhouse gases and making profit. If Lliuya was successful in German law, the principle would apply to all other companies responsible for releasing greenhouse gas emissions and the damage they cause, and could be applied in similar ways in all countries' tort laws.

== See also ==
- Law of the European Union
- Urgenda Foundation v State of the Netherlands (20 December 2019), duty of state to cut emissions in line with Paris Agreement and right to life
- Neubauer v Germany (24 March 2021), 1 BvR 2656/18, duty on state to reduce carbon emissions faster than government required in Act to protect right to life and environment
- Smith v Fonterra Co-operative Group Ltd (2021), NZCA 552 duty of oil and power companies in tort to pay for climate damage
- Milieudefensie v Royal Dutch Shell (26 May 2021), duty of an oil company in tort to cut emissions in line with Paris Agreement and right to life
- McGaughey and Davies v USS Ltd (2022), EWHC 1233 (Ch), directors' duties to plan to divest fossil fuels in light of Paris Agreement and right to life
