= Ira Philip =

Bermudian writer and politician (1925–2018)

Ira Philip MBE
- Born: Ira Pearman Philip; 16 December 1925; Somerset Village, Bermuda
- Died: 9 April 2018 (aged 92); Bermuda
- Occupations: Writer and politician
- Spouse: Ismay Grant Philip
- Parent: Marie Antoinette Pearman Philip (mother)

Ira Philip MBE (16 December 1925 – 9 April 2018) was a Bermudian writer and politician. He was he author of books that included Freedom Fighters: from Monk to Mazumbo, Hakim, son of Mazumbo, Heroines in the Medical Field and Champ: The One and Only Alma Hunt.

== Early life ==
Ira Pearman Philip was born on 16 December 1925, in Somerset Village, Bermuda. Motivated by his mother to become a writer, he was 11 when he had his earliest work published in the press, an essay on patriotism printed in 1937.

== Career ==
Philip's journalism career stretched six decades and was primary associated with the Bermuda Recorder and ZFB Radio. Philip counted Richard Allen, Marcus Garvey and A. Philip Randolph among his influences. Philip later represented the Progressive Labour Party (PLP) as a member of the Senate, and, in 2015, received the Drum Major Awards from the PLP.

In the 1999 Queen's Birthday Honours, Philip was appointed a Member of the Order of the British Empire (MBE) for public service.

== Personal life ==
Through his mother Marie Antoinette Pearman Philip he was related to the Pearman family of Somerset, Bermuda. His wife was singer Ismay Grant Philip and he was the father of seven children. On 9 April 2018, Philip died aged 92.

== Selected publications ==
- Freedom Fighters: From Monk to Mazumbo, 1988
- Heroines in the Medical Field of Bermuda, 1994
- Hakim, Son of Mazumbo, 1995
- The History of the Bermuda Industrial Union: a Definitive History of the Organised Labour Movement in Bermuda
- Champ: The One and Only Alma Hunt
