= 2017 in Bermuda =

Events in the year 2017 in Bermuda.

== Incumbents ==
- Monarch: Elizabeth II
- Governor: John Rankin
- Premier: Michael Dunkley (until 19 July); Edward David Burt (from 19 July)

== Events ==
- 5 May – Same-sex marriage in Bermuda becomes legal
- 17 to 26 June – the 2017 America's Cup was held on the Great Sound in Bermuda
- 18 July – Bermudian general election, 2017

== Deaths ==
- 15 May – David Saul, politician (b. 1939).
