= 2022 in Bermuda =

Events in the year 2022 in Bermuda.

== Incumbents ==
- Monarch: Elizabeth II (until 8 September); Charles III onwards
- Governor: Rena Lalgie
- Premier: Edward David Burt

== Events ==
- 22 July – Bermuda reports its first case of monkeypox.
- 21 September – Hurricane Fiona reached Category 4 as it moved from the Turks and Caicos Islands toward Bermuda.
- 4 October – Bermuda is removed from the European Union's tax haven blacklist,

== Sports ==
- 18 June – 3 July: Bermuda at the 2022 World Aquatics Championships
- 15 July – 24 July: Bermuda at the 2022 World Athletics Championships
- 28 July – 8 August: Bermuda at the 2022 Commonwealth Games

== Deaths ==
- 24 April – Freddy Hall, 37, Bermudian footballer (Telford United, Limerick, national team)
