= History of Bermuda =

1632 engraving of Bermuda's fortifications

The recorded history of Bermuda dates back to 1503, when it was written about by the Spanish explorer Juan de Bermúdez, whose surname was used as the island's namesake (the surname Bermudez being derived from the German "Beremund"). Having never been settled by indigenous Caribbeans, Bermuda remained uninhabited until Sea Venture, a merchant ship of the Virginia Company on the Third Supply mission to the English colony of Virginia, wrecked on a reef near the island on 3 August 1609. The crew and passengers of Sea Venture settled on Bermuda for nine months, resulting in the island becoming a permanent part of the English colonial empire. Bermuda's first capital, St. George's, was established in 1612.

The Virginia Company administered Bermuda as an extension of the colony of Virginia until 1614 and the company's corporate spin-off, the Somers Isles Company, took over in 1615 and managed the island until 1684 when the company's charter was revoked and Bermuda became a Crown colony. Bermuda remained under Crown rule but developed and maintained a degree of autonomy from officials in London. When Newfoundland joined Canada in 1949 Bermuda became the oldest remaining British colony, and has been the most populous remaining dependent territory of Britain since the handover of Hong Kong to China in 1997. Bermuda became a British Overseas Territory in 2002 as a result of the British Overseas Territories Act 2002.

== Initial discovery and early colony ==
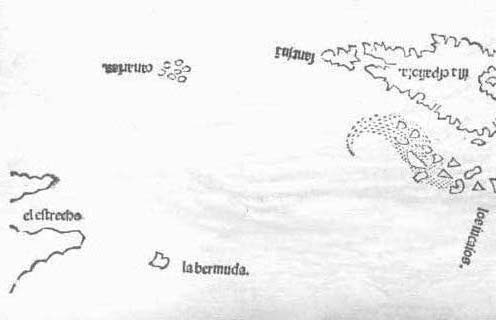
The Peter Martyr map, first map of the island of Bermuda in 1511, made by Peter Martyr d'Anghiera in his book Legatio Babylonica

The earliest depiction of the island is the inclusion of "La Bermuda" in the map of Pedro Martyr's 1511 Legatio Babylonica. The earliest description of the island was Gonzalo Fernández de Oviedo y Valdés' account of his 1515 visit with Juan de Bermúdez aboard La Garza. Antonio de Herrera y Tordesillas in 1527 affirms the island was named after the captain who discovered it. Henry Harrisse documents earlier voyages by Juan Bermúdez in 1498, 1502, and 1503, though John Henry Lefroy noted Bermúdez left no account of visiting the island. Samuel Eliot Morison lists a 1505 discovery by Juan Bermúdez, citing the investigation into the Archivo de Indias by Roberto Barreiro-Meiro. Compounding the confusion is the record of a Francisco Bermudez accompanying Christopher Columbus on his first voyage, a Diego Bermudez accompanying Columbus on his fourth voyage, and Juan's brother Diego Bermudez accompanying Ponce de León in a 1513 voyage. Thus, the only clearly documented account is of Juan Bermudez visiting the island in 1515, with the implication he had discovered the island on an earlier voyage. The island was definitely on the homeward course for returning Spaniards, as they followed the Gulf Stream north followed by the Westerlies just north of Bermuda. The Spanish avoided the uninhabited island's reefs and hurricanes, calling it Demoniorum Insulam. Yet, Spanish Rock bears the date of 1543, but little further details. A Frenchman called Russell was wrecked there in 1570, followed by the Englishman Henry May in 1593, but both managed to escape. Spanish Capt. Diego Ramirez was stranded on the rocks of Bermuda after a storm in 1603, when he discovered the "devils reported to be about Bermuda" were actually the outcry of the Bermuda petrel. He did note the former presence of men, including remnants of a wreck.

In late August 1585, an English ship Tiger commanded by Richard Grenville on his return from the Roanoke Colony, fought and captured a larger Spanish ship Santa Maria de San Vicente off the shores of Bermuda.

=== The 1609 shipwreck of Sea Venture ===
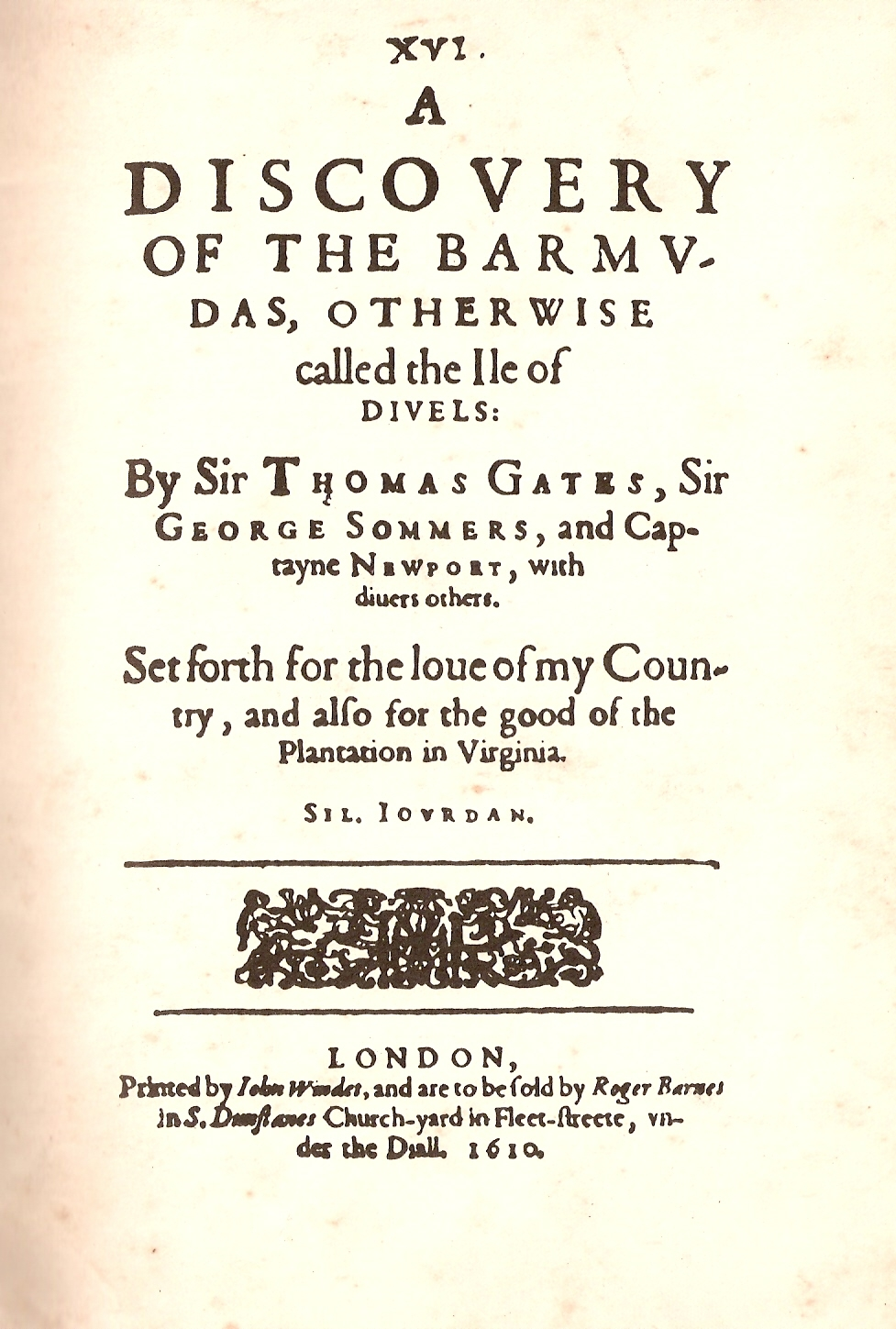
Silvester Jourdain's A Discovery of the Barmudas.

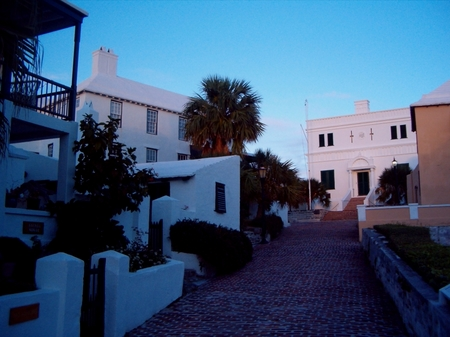
The State House, the building that housed the House of Assembly from 1620 until 1815.

On 2 June 1609, Sir George Somers had set sail aboard Sea Venture, the new flagship of the Virginia Company, leading a fleet of nine vessels, loaded with several hundred settlers, food and supplies for the new English colony of Jamestown, in Virginia. Somers had previous experience sailing with both Sir Francis Drake and Sir Walter Raleigh. The fleet was caught in a storm on 24 July, and Sea Venture was separated and began to founder. When the reefs to the East of Bermuda were spotted, the ship was deliberately driven on them to prevent its sinking, thereby saving all aboard, 150 sailors and settlers, and one dog. William Shakespeare's play The Tempest, in which the character Ariel refers to the "still-vex'd Bermoothes" (I.ii.229), is thought to have been inspired by William Strachey's and Silvester Jourdain's accounts of the shipwreck.

The survivors spent nine months on Bermuda. With ship's supplies mostly gone except for some domestic pigs, the castaways subsisted on rainwater, palm tree pulp, cedar berries, fish, birds (such as Bermuda petrel), and by hunting for the plentiful wild hogs from past Bermuda shipwrecks.

The master's mate and 7 other sailors were lost at sea when Sea Venture's longboat was rigged with a mast and sent in search of Jamestown to rescue the lot. The sailors were not seen again. The remainder of castaways built two new ships: Deliverance at 40 feet (12 m) and 80 tons, and Patience at 29 feet (8.8 m) and 30 tons, mostly from Bermuda cedar. When the two new vessels were completed, most of the survivors set sail on May 10th, completing their journey to Jamestown on June 8, 1610. Christopher Carter and Edward Waters remained, the latter being accused of murder, while four others had died, including John Rolfe's infant daughter. Later in Jamestown, Rolfe's wife died (and he would eventually marry a native, Pocahontas). The castaways arrived only to find the colony's population almost annihilated by the Starving Time, which had left only sixty survivors. According to Sir William Monson, the "swine brought from Bermuda" saved Virginia until the timely arrival of Lord De La Warre.

Somers returned to Bermuda on Patience in June and found Carter and Waters alive. Somers soon died, however, and while his heart was buried at Saint Georges, his nephew, Captain Matthew Somers, returned his embalmed body to England for burial at Dorset.

=== 1612 official settlement ===
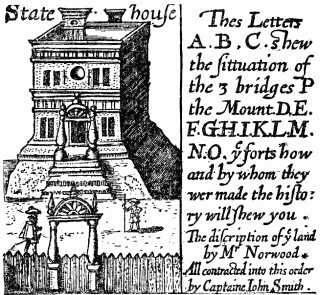
The State House of Bermuda by John Smith

Two years later, in 1612, the Virginia Company's Royal Charter was officially extended to include the island, and a party of sixty settlers was sent on Plough, under the command of Sir Richard Moore, the island's first governor. Joining the two men left behind by Deliverance and Patience (who had taken up residence on Smith's Island) and Edward Chard, they founded and commenced construction of the town of St. George, designated as Bermuda's first capital, the oldest continually inhabited English town in the New World.

Bermuda struggled throughout the following seven decades to develop a viable economy. The Virginia Company, finding the colony unprofitable, briefly handed its administration to the Crown in 1614. The following year, 1615, King James I granted a charter to a new company, the Somers Isles Company, formed by the same shareholders, which ran the colony until it was dissolved in 1684. (The Virginia Company itself was dissolved after its charter was revoked in 1624). Representative government was introduced to Bermuda in 1620, when its House of Assembly held its first session, and it became a self-governing colony.

=== Somers Isles Company (1615–1684) ===
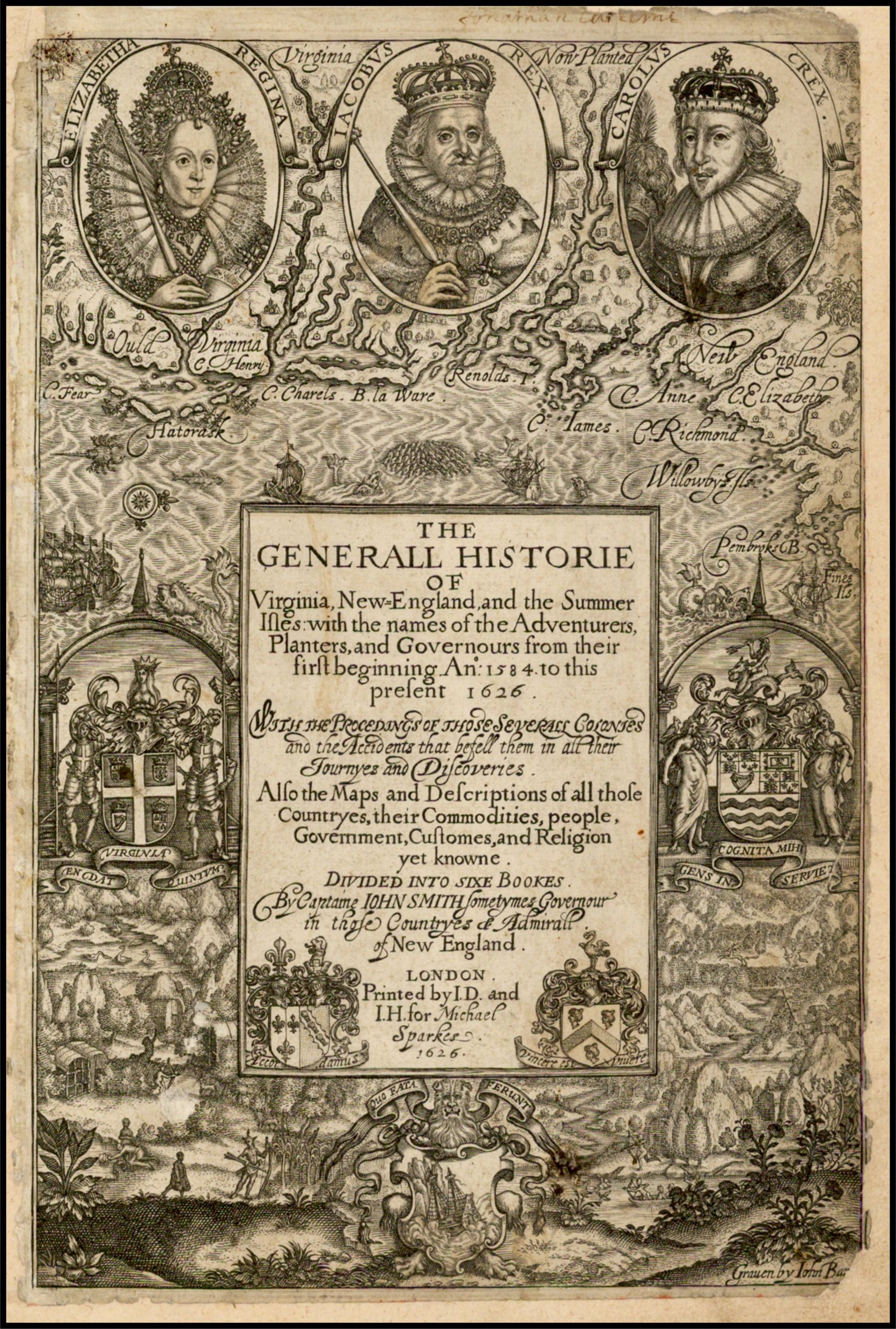
John Smith wrote one of the first Histories of Bermuda (in concert with Virginia and New England).

In 1615, the colony was passed to a new company, the Somers Isles Company, named after the admiral who saved his passengers from the Sea Venture. Many Virginian place names refer to the archipelago, such as Bermuda City, and Bermuda Hundred. The first British colonial currency was struck in Bermuda.

Bermuda was divided by Richard Norwood into eight equally sized administrative areas west of St. George's called "tribes" (today known as "parishes"). These "tribes" were areas of land partitioned off to the principal "Adventurers" (investors) of the company, from east to west – Bedford, Smiths, Cavendish, Paget, Mansell, Warwick, and Sandys.

The company sent 600 settlers in nine ships between 1612 and 1615. Governor Moore dug a well in St. George, then built fortifications including Paget and Smith's batteries at the entrance of the harbour, King's and Charles' at the entrance to Castle Harbour, Pembroke Fort on Cooper's Island, and Gates' Fort, St. Katherine's Fort and Warwick Castle to defend St. George. In 1614, the first English-grown tobacco was exported, the same tobacco variety John Rolfe started to grow in Virginia. The exporting of ambergris was especially lucrative.

==== Slavery in Bermuda ====
In August 1616, plantain, sugarcane, fig, and pineapple plants were imported along with the first Indian and Negro, the first English colony to use enslaved Africans. By 1619, Bermuda had between fifty and a hundred black enslaved persons. These were a mixture of native Africans who were trafficked to the Americas via the African slave trade and Native Americans who were enslaved from the Thirteen Colonies. The first African slaves arrived in Bermuda in 1617, not from Africa but from the West Indies. Bermuda Governor Tucker sent a ship to the West Indies to find black slaves to dive for pearls in Bermuda. More black slaves were later trafficked to the island in large numbers, originating from America and the Caribbean.

As the black population grew, so did the fear of insurrection among the white settlers. In 1623, a law to restrain the insolence of the Negroes was passed in Bermuda. It forbade blacks to buy or sell, barter or exchange tobacco or any other produce for goods without the consent of their master. Unrest amongst the slaves predictably erupted several times over the next decades. Major rebellions occurred in 1656, 1661, 1673, 1682, 1730 and 1761. In 1761 a conspiracy was discovered that involved the majority of the blacks on the island. Six slaves were executed and all black celebrations were prohibited.

==== Agricultural diversification ====
Though Bermuda exported more tobacco than Virginia until 1625, Bermuda diversified its agriculture to include corn, potatoes, fruit trees, poultry and livestock. This was especially true when prices collapsed in 1630, and tobacco took its toll on soil fertility, though the company continued to use tobacco as a medium of exchange and resist a diversified economy. Tobacco exports peaked in 1684, the last year of company control.

English immigration essentially ceased by the 1620s when all available land was occupied. Because of its limited land area, Bermuda relied on emigration, especially to the developing English colonies in the Bahamas, the Carolinas, New York and the Caribbean. Between 1620 and 1640, 1200 emigrated, while the population reached 4000 in 1648. Between 1679 and 1690, 2000 emigrated, while the population reached 6248 in 1691.

The archipelago's limited land area and resources led to the creation of what may be the earliest conservation laws of the New World. In 1616 and 1620, acts were passed banning the hunting of certain birds and young tortoises.

=== English Civil War in the Bermuda ===
In 1649, the English Civil War was in its seventh year and King Charles I was beheaded in Whitehall, London. In Bermuda, related tensions resulted in civil war on the island; it was ended by militias. The majority of colonists developed a strong sense of devotion to the Crown. Dissenters, such as Puritans and Independents, were pushed to settle the Bahamas under William Sayle. However, the Earl of Dorset, a royalist, was replaced by the Earl of Warwick, a Puritan, as governor of the Somers Island Company. Sayle and most of the emigrants were allowed to return to Bermuda in 1656.

Bermuda and Virginia, as well as Antigua and Barbados were, however, the subjects of the September 1650 Prohibitory Act of the Rump Parliament, and the Atlantic fleet was instructed to bring these opposing colonies into obedience. At the same time, John Danvers, governor of the Somers Island Company, and the other adventurers were forced to take the oath of allegiance to the Commonwealth. Then in the 1651 Navigation Act, trade was restricted to English ships.

An Act for prohibiting Trade with the Barbadoes, Virginia, Bermuda and Antego, specified that:

due punishment [be] inflicted upon the said Delinquents, do Declare all and every the said persons in Barbada's, Antego, Bermuda's and Virginia, that have contrived, abetted, aided or assisted those horrid Rebellions, or have since willingly joyned with them, to be notorious Robbers and Traitors, and such as by the Law of Nations are not to be permitted any maner of Commerce or Traffique with any people whatsoever; and do forbid to all maner of persons, Foreiners, and others, all maner of Commerce, Traffique and Correspondency whatsoever, to be used or held with the said Rebels in the Barbada's, Bermuda's, Virginia and Antego, or either of them.

All Ships that Trade with the Rebels may be surprised. Goods and tackle of such ships not to be embezeled, till judgement in the Admiralty.; Two or three of the Officers of every ship to be examined upon oath.

In 1658, the Company appointed Sayle Governor of Bermuda, and the islanders took the oath of allegiance to the Lord Protector.

=== Indentured servitude and slavery in 17th century Bermuda ===
Among the emigrants after Norwood finished his survey were Bridewell, Newgate and gaol transportees, indentured servants, and "maids for wives". Yet most were emigrant families bound for four to five years as tenant farmers, paying half the tobacco they grew as rent to their landlord. This tenantry, indentured servitude of five years in return for passage, and family labor, reduced the need for slaves in growing tobacco and provisions. Thus, though Bermuda was a slave society, slavery was not essential to the agriculture economy, and Bermuda did not actively import slaves, instead relying on those black and Indian adults captured by privateers, then sold as slaves in Bermuda. This was a break in the usual pattern, in which slaves were purchased in Africa from local chiefs who had enslaved them in wars, or for committing crimes. Black indentures were for 99 years or life. The few Scot exiles received after the Civil War were indentured for seven years, while the few Irish exiles from that same period caused the slave trouble of 1664, and were hence forbidden entry onwards. The indentured system importance ceased by 1668. This non-dependence on slavery changed however, when the island moved to a maritime economy in the 1690s, and incorporated slave sailors, carpenters, coopers, blacksmiths, masons, and shipwrights. Hiring out of these skilled slaves became commonplace for their owners, with slaves retaining only a third of the wages they earned. By 1710, slaves were doing much vital work and constituted 3,517 of the total population of 8,366 in 1721.

Slaves could be obtained by sale or purchase, auction debt, legal seizure or by gift. The price of a slave depended on demand. Throughout the 17th century children sold for £8, women from £10 to £20, and able bodied men for around £26.

Slave revolts were a threat since 1623, while a revolt in 1656 resulted in executions and banishments. A 1664 revolt was stopped early, as was one in 1673, and again in 1681, which resulted in five executions. These revolts resulted in the orders of 1674 mandating that slaves straying from their premises, wandering at night without permission, or the gathering of two or three slaves from different tribes, be whipped. Any blacks deemed free were required to become slaves again or leave the island. The importation of additional slaves was also banned. A Jamaican slave named Tom was deported in 1682, when his rebellious plot was divulged by two Bermudian slaves.

== The 18th century ==
=== The salt trade and the Turks Islands ===
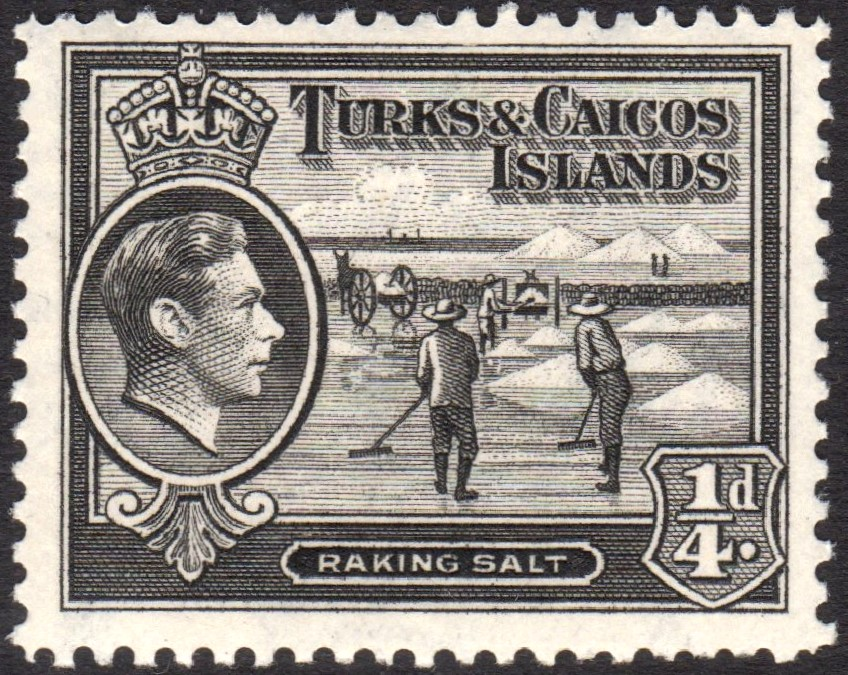
Raking salt on the Turks and Caicos Islands on a 1938 postage stamp.

Bermudians were raking sea salt in the Caribbean since the 1630s, an essential ingredient for making cheese, butter, and preserving meat and fish. Rakers would channel sea water in salt pans for evaporation. Salt Cay and Grand Turk Island became salt colonies in the 1680s. According to Jarvis, "these small, hot, dry, and barren islands" were perfect for salt production since the limestone, absence of fresh water, and limited rain fall combined to make the soil unfertile. Yet, average temperatures in the eighties Fahrenheit and the eastern trade wind facilitated evaporation of sea water into a saturated brine for salt crystallized. Natural ponds were augmented with sluices and causeways. Salt originating from this province was cherished for its "brilliant color, purity, and versatility," according to Jarvis. In 1708, eighteen vessels were involved in raking salt, and this number grew to 65 in 1716, during the March to November raking season. By 1740, 200 vessels were loading salt annually from Grand Turk and Salt Cay, while a few dozen rakers stayed during the winter to repair pans.

Outside any colonial jurisdiction, Great Britain nevertheless claimed the islands "by right of Bermudian discovery, seasonal occupation, and improvement," according to Jarvis. Yet, France and Spain disputed Britain's claims with many attacks, coupled with those by pirates. Attacks from France and Spain commenced in 1709 and did not stop until 1764, when Great Britain's sovereignty was recognized. In 1693, Bahamas governor Nicholas Trott taxed the rakers, and renewed those taxes in 1738. Peace transformed the raking business from an almost all white enterprise, to mixed slave and free labor. Seasonal rakers also increased from 300 in 1768 to almost 800 in 1775.

When the Bermudian sloop Seaflower was seized by the Bahamians in 1701, the response of Bermuda Governor Bennett was to issue letters of marque to Bermudian Privateers. In 1706, Spanish and French forces ousted the Bermudians, but were driven out themselves three years later by a Bermudian privateer under the command of Captain Lewis Middleton in what was probably Bermuda's only independent military operation. His ship, the Rose, attacked a Spanish and a French privateer holding a captive English vessel. Defeating the two enemy vessels, the Rose then cleared out the thirty-man garrison left by the Spanish and French.

In 1766, the Board of Trade granted Andrew Symmer, a Bermudian merchant, the Crown Agent for the Turks and Caicos Islands. Symmer then set a residency requirement of six months, modified the rakers elected government of five commissioners, initiated a mandatory militia requirement, and taxed each bushel of salt. Bahamian governor Thomas Shirley then tried to take control in 1772 and drive away the Bermudian rakers. By then, 750 of the 800 Turks Islands' rakers were from Bermuda. In 1774, Bermuda sent a sloop to protect their rakers after a Bahamian tax collector was beaten. A veto of the Bahamian Acts by the Board of Trade prevented escalating violence.

The Bahamas, meanwhile, was incurring considerable expense in absorbing loyalist refugees from the now-independent American colonies, and returned to the idea of taxing Turks salt for the needed funds. The Bahamian government ordered that all ships bound for the Turk Islands obtain a license at Nassau first. The Bermudians refused to do this. Following this, Bahamian authorities seized the Bermuda sloops Friendship and Fanny in 1786. Shortly after, three Bermudian vessels were seized at Grand Caicos, with $35,000 worth of goods salvaged from a French ship. French privateers were becoming a menace to Bermudian operations in the area, at the time, but the Bahamians were their primary concern.

The Bahamian government re-introduced a tax on salt from the Turks, annexed them to the Bahamas, and created a seat in the Bahamian parliament to represent them. The Bermudians refused these efforts also, but the continual pressure from the Bahamians had a negative effect on the salt industry. In 1806, the Bermudian customs authorities went some way toward acknowledging the Bahamian annexation when it ceased to allow free exchange between the Turks and Bermuda (this affected many enslaved Bermudians, who, like the free ones, had occupied the Turks only seasonally, returning to their homes in Bermuda after the year's raking had finished).

That same year, French privateers attacked the Turks, burning ships and absconding with a large sloop. The Bahamians refused to help, and the Admiralty in Jamaica claimed the Turks were beyond its jurisdiction. Two hurricanes, the first in August 1813, the second in October 1815, destroyed more than two hundred buildings and significant salt stores; and sank many vessels. By 1815, the United States, the primary client for Turks salt, had been at war with Britain (and hence Bermuda) for three years, and had established other sources of salt.

With the destruction wrought by the storm, and the loss of market, many Bermudians abandoned the Turks, and those remaining were so distraught that they welcomed the visit of the Bahamian governor in 1819. The British government eventually assigned political control to the Bahamas, which the Turks and Caicos remained a part of until the 1840s.

One Bermudian salt raker, Mary Prince, however, was to leave a scathing record of Bermuda's activities there in The History of Mary Prince, a book which helped to propel the abolitionist cause to the 1834 emancipation of slaves throughout the Empire.

=== Shipbuilding and the maritime economy ===
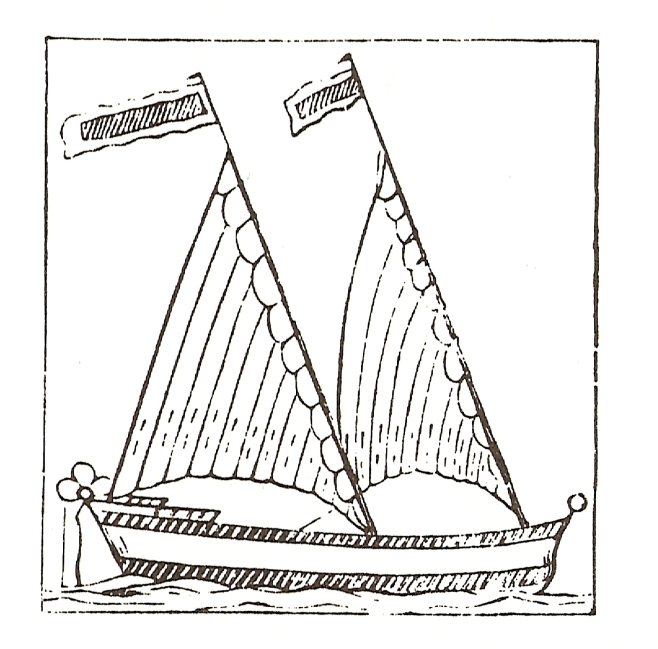
A 17th-century woodcut of a Bermudian sailing vessel, displaying the triangular sails of the Bermuda rig.

With royal administration commencing under Charles II in 1683, and the end of company control in 1684, the island was able to change the basis of its economy from tobacco to maritime enterprises. The maritime economy included ship building, wrecking, whaling, piloting and fishing in local waters. The population at that time consisted of 5889 whites and 1737 slaves. While Tobacco ceased to be a commercial crop by 1710, Bermuda's fleet had grown from fourteen vessels in 1679 to sixty sloops, six brigantines and four ships in 1700.

These "Bermuda sloops" had their origin in the ship Jacob Jacobson first built after becoming shipwrecked on the island in 1619, and were based on craft sailing on the Zuiderzee and the Dutch coastal sloep. These two-masted vessels, with the mast "raked" or inclined 15 degrees aft, carried fore-and-aft rigs of triangular Bermuda sails. Large mainsails were fixed to elongated booms, giving the sloop a large sail area for maximum speed, averaging 3 knots, but known to exceed 5 knots. Finally, these sloops were especially adept at sailing into the wind, maneuvering, and close-hauled sailing.

Smaller vessels were originally built for local use, fishing and hauling freight and passengers about the archipelago. By the 1630s, with dwindling income from tobacco exports, largely due to increased competition as the Virginia and newer colonies in the West Indies turned to tobacco cultivation, many of the absentee landowners in England sold their shares to the managers and tenants that occupied them, who turned increasingly to subsistence crops and raising livestock. Bermuda was quickly producing more food than it could consume, and began to sell the excess to the newer colonies that were cultivating tobacco to the exclusion of food crops required for their own subsistence. As the Somers Isles Company's magazine ship would not carry such cargo, Bermudians began constructing their own larger, ocean-going vessels for this purpose. They favoured single-masted designs, more commonly with a gaff-rigged mainsail, although a single larger sail required a larger, more highly skilled, crew than two or more smaller sails.

The sloops were built from Bermuda cedar, considered the best wood for shipping, according to Bermuda Governor Isaac Richier in 1691. This is because this cedar was as strong as American oak, yet weighed only two thirds as much. Long lasting due to its resistance to marine organisms, the cedar also had the advantage of being readily used for ship building, and were even planned as such while still growing. Using enslaved and free labor and year-round construction, a 30-ton sloop could be built in three to four months. Bermudians also adopted a reforestation policy, with groves cultivated as long-term crops, and passed down to future generations as dowries or inheritances.

The Bermuda sloop became highly regarded for its speed and manoeuvrability, and was soon adapted for service with the Royal Navy. The Bermuda sloop HMS Pickle carried dispatches of the victory at Trafalgar, and news of the death of Admiral Nelson, to England.

=== Privateering ===
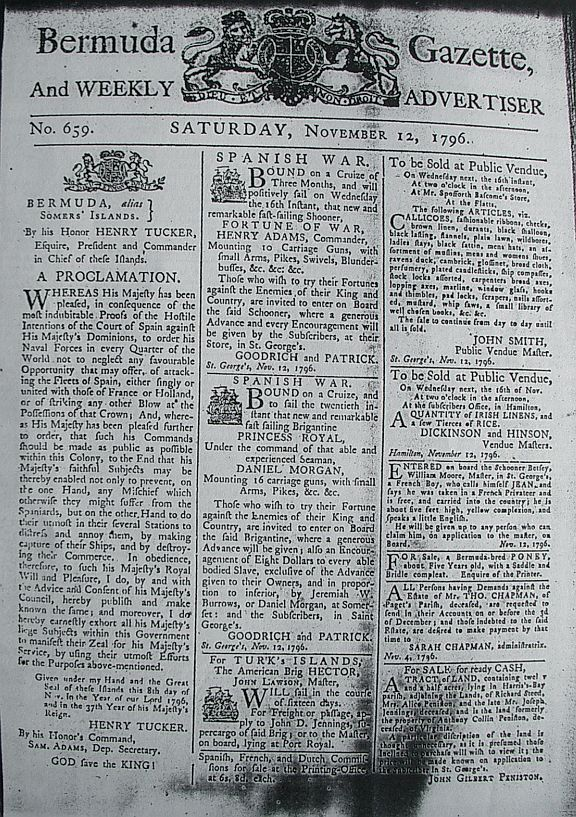
Bermuda Gazette of 12 November 1796, calling for privateering against Spain and its allies, and with advertisements for crew for two privateer vessels

Bermuda was a center of privateering for most of its early history, with Bermuda governors Nathaniel Butler and Benjamin Bennett actively encouraging the practice. Robert Rich, 2nd Earl of Warwick (the namesake of Warwick Parish, was one of the major Adventurers of the Somers Isles Company due primarily to the use he realised could be made of Bermuda as a base for his privateers. Although Bermuda had no merchant or privateering fleet of its own at the time, many Bermudians left farming to work as privateers on English vessels operating from Bermuda, and in 1631 also to settle the short-lived Providence Island colony that was dedicated to privateering. During King George's War, according to Jarvis, "privateering became widespread, respectable, and even patriotic." At least fifteen Bermudian privateers operated in the 1740s. State-licensed, privateers had the authority to capture enemy vessels or British vessels engaged in trading contraband. Alternatively, a letter of marque could be issued to a mariner engaged in trade, giving him the authority to seize any vessel they may come across. Vice admiralty courts reviewed the legality of any capture and subsequent distribution of cargo and prizes. Crews were a mixture of free and enslaved labor.

Despite close links to the American colonies (and the material aid provided to the continental rebels in the form of a hundred barrels of stolen gunpowder and reportedly numerous Bermudian-built and other ships supplied by Bermudians), Bermudian privateers turned as aggressively on American shipping during the American War of Independence. An American naval captain, ordered to take his ship out of Boston Harbour to eliminate a pair of Bermudian privateering vessels, which had been picking off vessels missed by the Royal Navy, returned frustrated, saying the Bermudians sailed their ships two feet for every one of ours. The only attack on Bermuda during the war was carried out by two South Carolina sloops captained by a pair of Bermudian-born brothers (they damaged a fort and spiked its guns before retreating). It greatly surprised the Americans to discover that the crews of Bermudian privateers included Black slaves, as, with limited manpower, Bermuda had legislated that a part of all Bermudian crews must be made up of Blacks. In fact, when the Bermudian privateer Regulator was captured, virtually all of her crew were found to be Black slaves. Authorities in Boston offered these men their freedom, but with families in Bermuda all seventy men elected to be treated as Prisoners of War. Sent to New York on the sloop Duxbury, they seized the vessel and sailed it back to Bermuda.

The American War of 1812 was to be the encore of Bermudian privateering, which had died out after the 1790s, due partly to the buildup of the naval base in Bermuda, which reduced the Admiralty's reliance on privateers in the western Atlantic, and partly to successful American legal suits, and claims for damages pressed against British privateers, a large portion of which were aimed squarely at the Bermudians (unfortunately for the privateers, the British government was trying to woo the United States away from its affiliation with France and so gave a favourable ear to American shipowners). During the course of the American War of 1812, Bermudian privateers were to capture 298 ships (the total captures by all British naval and privateering vessels between the Great Lakes and the West Indies was 1,593 vessels).

=== Bermuda and the American War of Independence ===
On the eve of the American independence, Bermuda faced competition with its maritime economy. Bermudian emigrants to Virginia helped expand the growth of its merchant fleet, enabling it to exceed Bermuda's by 1762. By the 1770s, Virginia was launching more vessels than Bermuda. Only able to grow enough food to feed the population of 11,000 a few months out of the year, Bermudians relied on food imports from North America, and the consequent higher costs. Many Bermudians had emigrated to Belize to harvest mahogany, or to Georgia, East Florida and the Bahamas islands. Bermudians continued to fish the Grand Banks until forbidden by the Palliser's Act.

Politically, issues causing protest elsewhere little affected the island, lacking newspapers and an effective local government, which refused to raise public revenue, the island had long relied on smuggling and the circumventing of customs officers. Lacking a permanent garrison made the island immune to the Quartering Acts. Finally, the island had long been ambivalent to events in New England, whom the Bermudians considered their maritime rivals.

Bermuda's ambivalence changed in September 1774, when the Continental Congress resolved to ban trade with Great Britain, Ireland, and the West Indies after 10 September 1775. Such an embargo would mean the collapse of their intercolonial commerce, famine and civil unrest. Lacking political channels with Great Britain, the Tucker Family met in May 1775 with eight other parishioners, and resolved to send delegates to the Continental Congress in July, with the goal of an exemption from the ban. Henry Tucker noted a clause in the ban which allowed the exchange of American goods for military supplies. The clause was confirmed by Benjamin Franklin when Tucker met with the Pennsylvania Committee of Safety. Independently, Tucker's sons St. George and Thomas Tudor confirmed this business arrangement with Peyton Randolph and the Charlestown Committee of Safety, while another Bermudian, Harris, did so with George Washington.

Three American vessels, independently operating from Charlestown, Philadelphia and Newport, sailed to Bermuda, and on 14 August 100 barrels of gunpowder were taken from the Bermudian magazine, while the loyalist Governor George James Bruere slept, and loaded onto these vessels. As a consequence, on 2 October the Continental Congress exempted Bermuda from their trade ban, and Bermuda thus acquired a reputation for disloyalty. In late 1775, the British Parliament passed the Prohibitory Act to prohibit trade with the American rebelling colonies, and sent HMS Scorpion to keep watch over the island. The island's forts were stripped of cannon, such that by the end of 1775, all of Bermuda's forts were without cannon, shot and powder. Yet, wartime trade of contraband continued along well established family connections. With 120 vessels by 1775, Bermuda continued to trade with St. Eustatius through 1781, and provided salt to North American ports, despite the presence of hundreds of loyal privateers.

In June 1776, HMS Nautilus secured the island, followed by HMS Galatea in September. Yet, the two British captains seemed more intent on capturing prize money, causing a severe food shortage on the island until the departure of Nautilus in October. After France's entry into the war in 1778, Sir Henry Clinton refortified and garrisoned the island under the command of Major William Sutherland. As a result, 91 French and American ships were captured in the winter of 1778–1779, bringing the population once again to the brink of starvation. Bermudian trade was severely hampered by the combination of the Royal Navy, the British garrison and loyalist privateers, such that famine struck the island in 1779.

The death of George Bruere in 1780, turned the governorship over to his son, George Bruere Jr., an active loyalist. Under his leadership, smuggling was stopped, and the Bermudian colonial government populated with like-minded loyalists. Even Henry Tucker abandoned trading with the United States, because of the presence of many privateers. Loyalist privateers based in Bermuda captured 114 prizes between 1777 and 1781, while 130 were captured in 1782.

The fallout of the war was that Britain lost all of its continental naval bases between the Maritimes and Spanish Florida, ultimately the West Indies. This launched Bermuda into a new prominence with the London Government, as its location, near the halfway point from Nova Scotia to the Caribbean, and off the US Atlantic Seaboard, allowed the Royal Navy to operate fully in the area, protecting British trade routes, and potentially commanding the American Atlantic coast in the event of war. The value of Bermuda in the hands of, or serving as a base for, enemies of the United States was shown by the roles it played in the American War of 1812 and the American Civil War. The blockade of the Atlantic ports by the Royal Navy throughout the first war (described in the US as the Second War of Independence) was orchestrated from Bermuda, and the task force that burned Washington DC in 1814 was launched from the colony. During the latter war, Confederate blockade runners delivered European munitions into Southern harbours from Bermuda, smuggling cotton in the reverse direction.

Consequently, the very features that made Bermuda such a prized base for the Royal Navy (its headquarters in the North Atlantic and West Indies until after the Second World War), also meant it was perpetually threatened by US invasion, as the US would have liked to both deny the base to an enemy, and use it as a way to extend its defences hundreds of miles out to sea, which would not happen until the Second World War.

As a result of the large regular army garrison established to protect the naval facilities, Bermuda's parliament allowed the Bermudian militia to become defunct after the end of the American war in 1815. More profound changes took place, however. The post American independence buildup of Royal Navy facilities in Bermuda meant the Admiralty placed less reliance on Bermudian privateers in the area. Combined with the effects of the American lawsuits, this meant the activity died out in Bermuda until a brief resurgence during the American War of 1812. With the American continental ports having become foreign territory, the Bermudian merchant shipping trade was seriously injured. During the course of American War of 1812, the Americans had developed other sources for salt, and Bermudians salt trade fell upon hard times. Control of the Turks Islands ultimately passed into the hands of Bermuda's sworn enemy, the Bahamas, in 1819. The shipbuilding industry had caused the deforestation of Bermuda's cedar by the start of the 19th century. As ships became larger, increasingly were built from metal, and with the advent of steam power, and with the vastly reduced opportunities Bermudians found for commerce due to US independence and the greater control exerted over their economies by developing territories, Bermuda's shipbuilding industry and maritime trades were slowly strangled.

The chief leg of the Bermudian economy became defence infrastructure. Even after tourism began in the later 19th century, Bermuda remained, in the eyes of London, a base more than a colony, and this led to a change in the political dynamics within Bermuda as its political and economic ties to Britain were strengthened, and its independence on the world stage was diminished. By the end of the 19th century, except for the presence of the naval and military facilities, Bermuda was thought of by non-Bermudians and Bermudians alike as a quiet, rustic backwater, completely at odds with the role it had played in the development of the English-speaking Atlantic world, a change that had begun with American independence.

== 19th century ==
=== Naval and military base ===
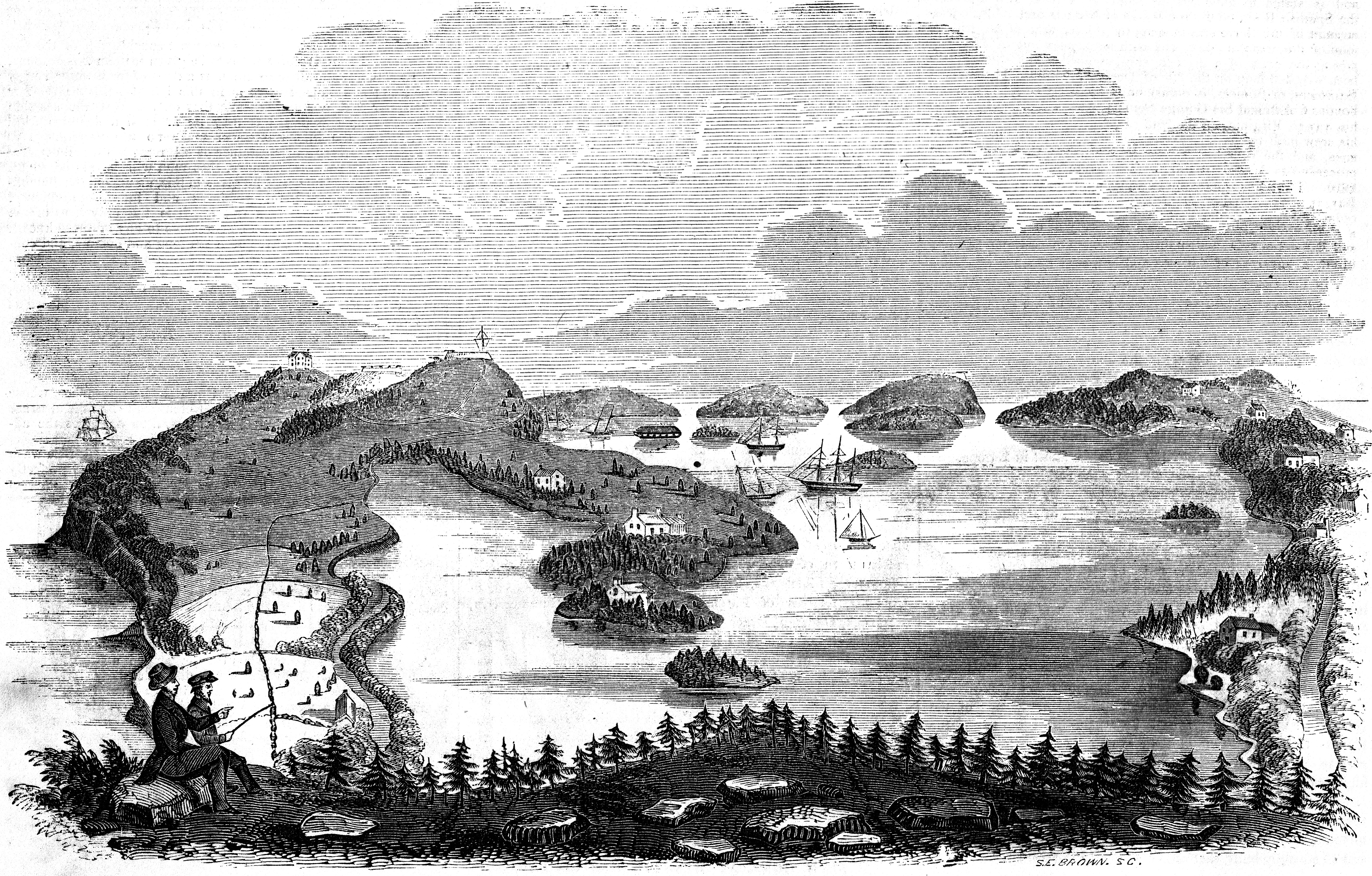
The harbour at St. George in 1854

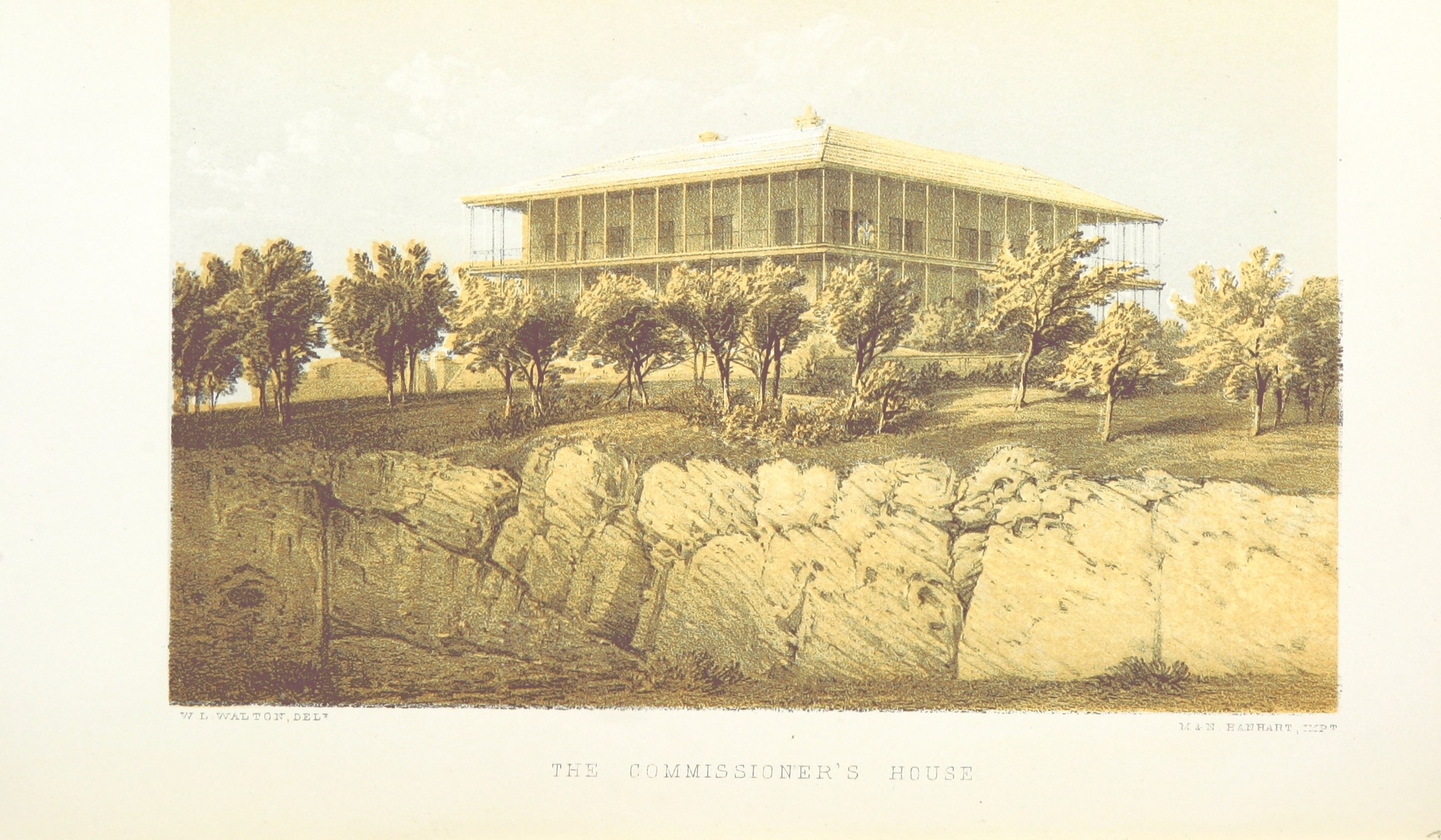
The Commissioner's House, 1857

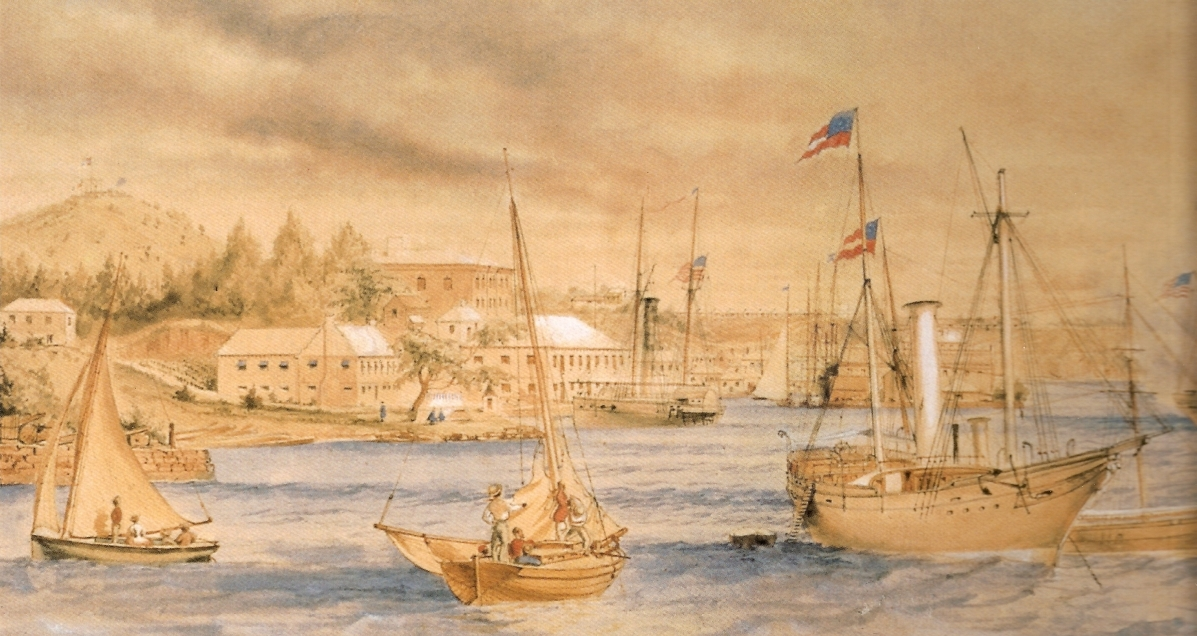
A Confederate blockade runner at anchor at St. George's, c. 1864

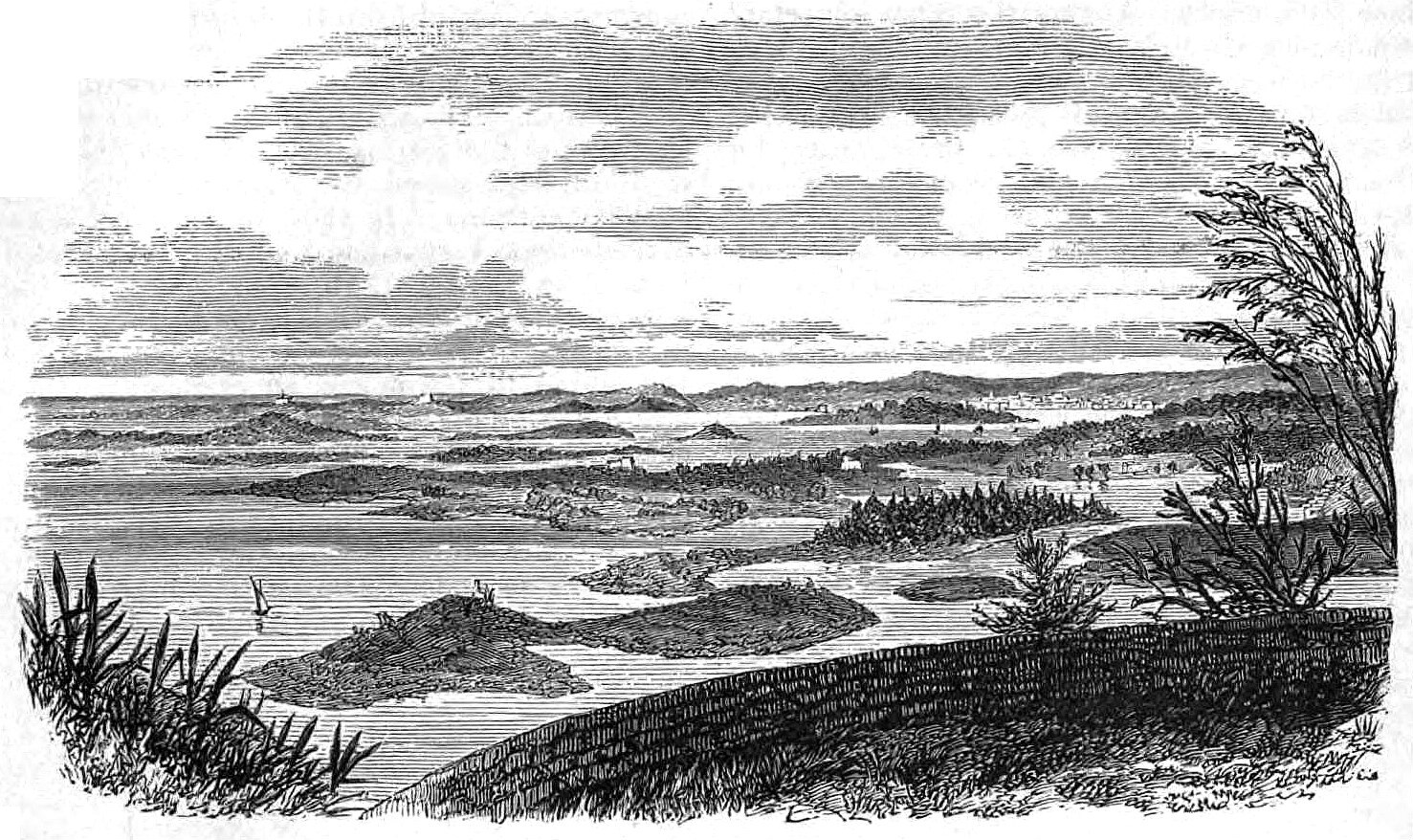
View in the Bermudas, with Hamilton in the distance, 1879

Following the American Revolution and the loss of Britain's ports in its former continental colonies, Bermuda was also used as a stopover point between Canada and Britain's Caribbean possessions, and assumed a new strategic prominence for the Royal Navy. Hamilton, a centrally located port founded in 1790, became the seat of government in 1815. This was partly resultant from the Royal Navy having invested twelve years, following American independence, in charting Bermuda's reefs. It did this in order to locate the deepwater channel by which shipping might reach the islands in, and at the West of, the Great Sound, which it had begun acquiring with a view to building a naval base. However, that channel also gave access to Hamilton Harbour.

In 1811, the Royal Navy started building the large dockyard on Ireland Island, in the west of the chain, to serve as its principal naval base guarding the western Atlantic Ocean shipping lanes. To guard it, the British Army built up a large Bermuda Garrison, and heavily fortified the archipelago.

During the War of 1812 between Britain and the United States, the British attacks on Washington, D.C. and the Chesapeake were planned and launched from Bermuda, where the headquarters of the Royal Navy's North American Station had recently been moved from Halifax, Nova Scotia.

In 1816, James Arnold, the son of Benedict Arnold, fortified Bermuda's Royal Naval Dockyard against possible US attacks. Today, the National Museum of Bermuda, which incorporates Bermuda's Maritime Museum, occupies the Keep of the Royal Naval Dockyard, including the Commissioner's House, and exhibits artifacts of the base's military history.

In the 1860s, the major build-up of naval and military infrastructure brought vital money into Bermuda at a time when its traditional maritime industries were giving way under the assault of steel hulls and steam propulsion. The American Civil War, also, briefly, provided a shot-in-the-arm to the local economy.

As a result of Bermuda's proximity to the southeastern US coast, during the American Civil War Confederate States blockade runners frequently used it as a stopping point base for runs to and from the Southern states or England to evade Union naval vessels on blockade patrol, delivering much needed war goods from England and for transporting much needed cotton back to England. The old Globe Hotel in St George's, which was a centre of intrigue for Confederate agents, is preserved as a public museum.

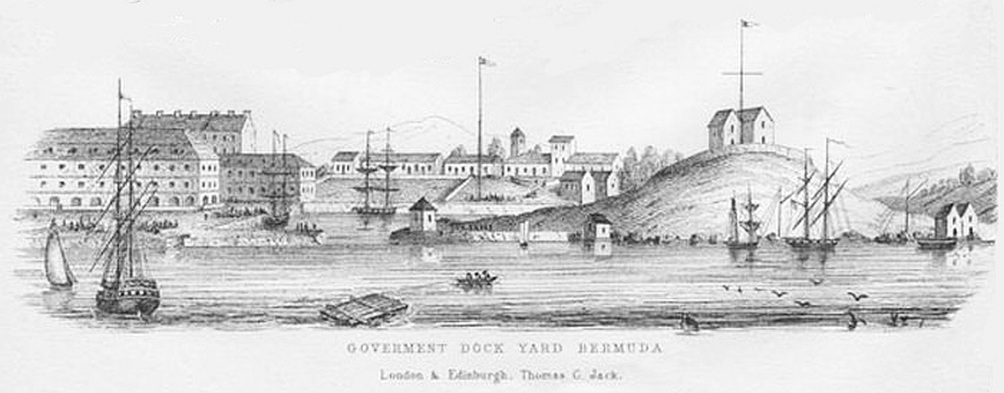
An engraving of the HM Dockyard on Ireland Island, Bermuda, c. 1860, by Thomas Chisholm Jack

With the buildup of the Royal Naval establishment in the first decades of the 19th century, a large number of military fortifications and batteries were constructed, and the numbers of regular infantry, artillery, and support units that composed the British Army garrison were steadily increased. The investment into military infrastructure by the War Office proved unsustainable, and poorly thought out, with far too few artillery men available to man the hundreds of guns emplaced. Many of the forts were abandoned, or removed from use, soon after construction. Following the Crimean War, the trend was towards reducing military garrisons in colonies like Bermuda, partly for economic reasons, and partly as it became recognised that the Royal Navy's own ships could provide a better defence for the Dockyard, and Bermuda. Still, the important strategic location of Bermuda meant that the withdrawal, which began, at least in intent, in the 1870s, was carried out very slowly over several decades, continuing until after World War I. The last Regular Army units were not withdrawn until the Dockyard itself closed in the 1950s.

Tourism and agricultural industries would develop in the latter half of the 19th century. However, it was defence infrastructure that formed the central platform of the economy into the 20th century.

=== Anglo-Boer War ===
During the Anglo-Boer War (1899–1902), Bermuda received and housed a total of 5,000 Boer prisoners of war (POWs) on five of its islands. They were placed related to their views and authorities' assessment of risk. "Bitterenders" (Afrikaans: Bittereinders), men who refused to pledge allegiance to the British Crown, were interned on Darrell's Island and closely guarded. Other islands were allowed to be nearly self-governing: Morgan's Island held 884 men, including 27 officers; Tucker's Island held 809 Boer prisoners, Burt's Island had 607, and Port's Island held 35.

In June 1901, The New York Times reported an attempted mutiny by 900 Boer prisoners of war en route to Bermuda on Armenian, noting it was suppressed. It described the preparation of the camps for the men and said that martial law would hold on Darrell's Island. Several escapes happened soon after their arrival. A young Boer soldier escaped from Darrell's Island soon after arrival, reached the main docks, and stowed away on the steamship Trinidad, arriving in New York on 9 July. He hoped to be allowed to stay in the US. Three prisoners of war escaped on 10 July from Darrell's Island to mainland Bermuda.

The most famous escapee was the Boer prisoner of war Captain Fritz Joubert Duquesne who was serving a life sentence for "conspiracy against the British government and on (the charge of) espionage." On the night of 25 June 1902, Duquesne slipped out of his tent, worked his way over a barbed wire fence, swam 1.5 miles (2.4 km) past patrol boats and bright spot lights, through storm-wracked, using the distant Gibbs Hill Lighthouse for navigation until he arrived ashore on the main island. From there he escaped to the port of St. George's and a week later, he stowed away on a boat heading to Baltimore, Maryland. He settled in the US and later became a spy for Germany in both World Wars. He claimed to be responsible for the 1916 death of Lord Kitchener in the sinking of HMS Hampshire, the head of the British Army who had also commanded British forces in South Africa during the second Boer War, but this had resulted from a mine. In 1942, Colonel Duquesne was arrested by the FBI for leading the Duquesne Spy Ring, which still to this day the largest espionage case in the history of the United States.

Lord Kitchener's brother, Lieutenant General Sir Walter Kitchener, had been the Governor of Bermuda from 1908 until his death in 1912. His son, Major Hal Kitchener, bought Hinson's Island (with his partner, Major Hemming, another First World War aviator). The island had formerly been part of the Boer POW camp, housing teenaged prisoners from 1901 to 1902.

== 20th century ==
=== Tourism ===
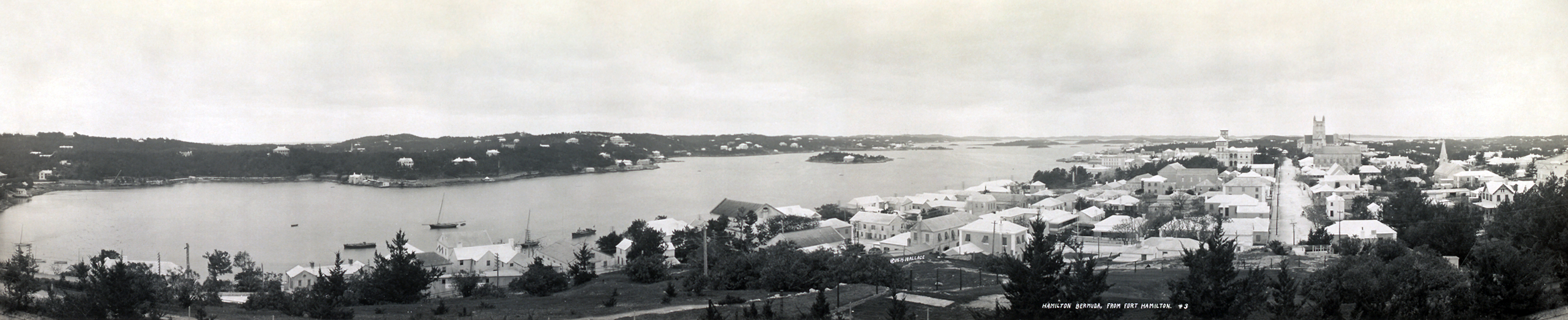
Panorama of Hamilton, 1911. View from Fort Hamilton.

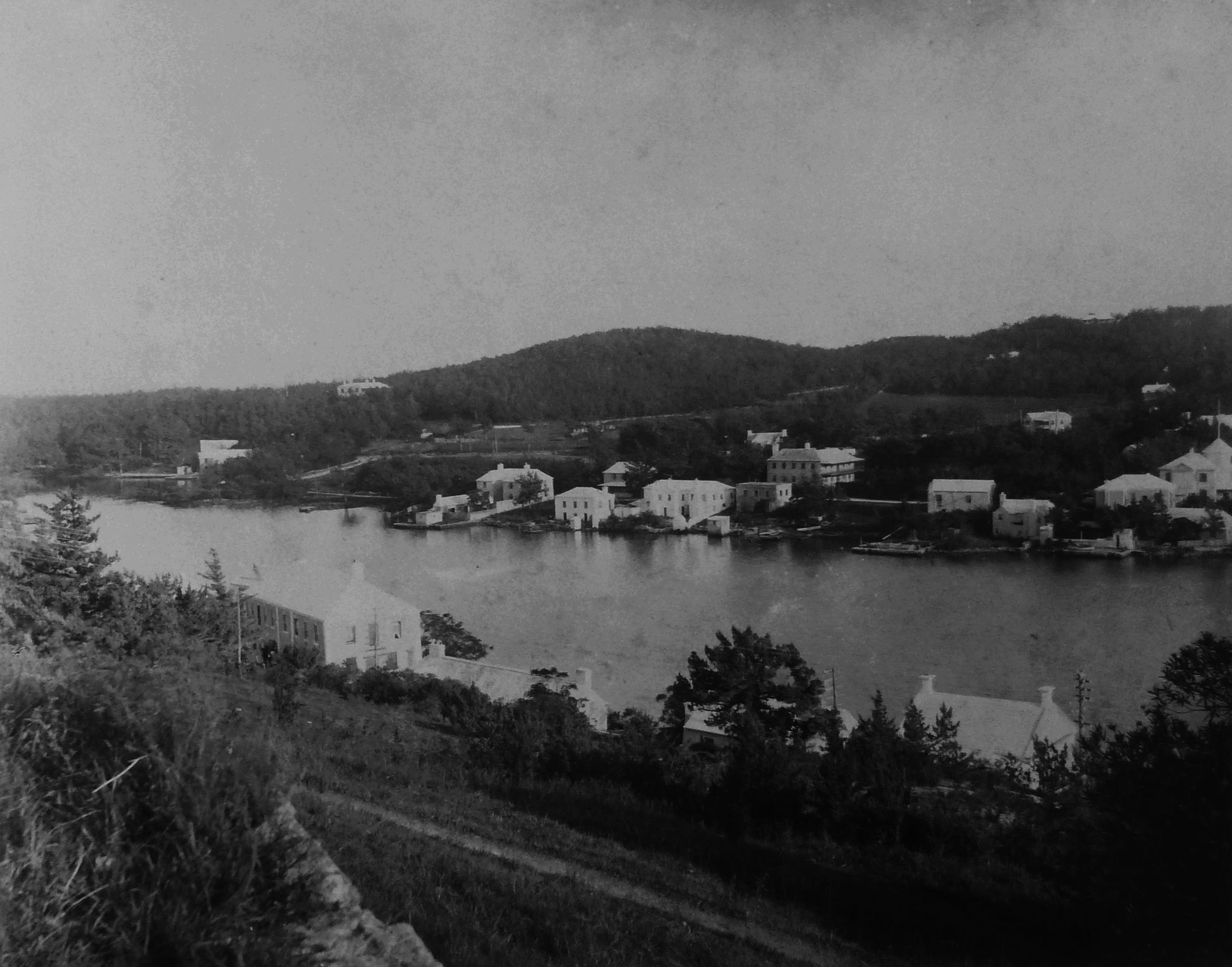
1904 view across Hamilton Harbour from Fort Hamilton of cedar-cloaked hills in Paget Parish

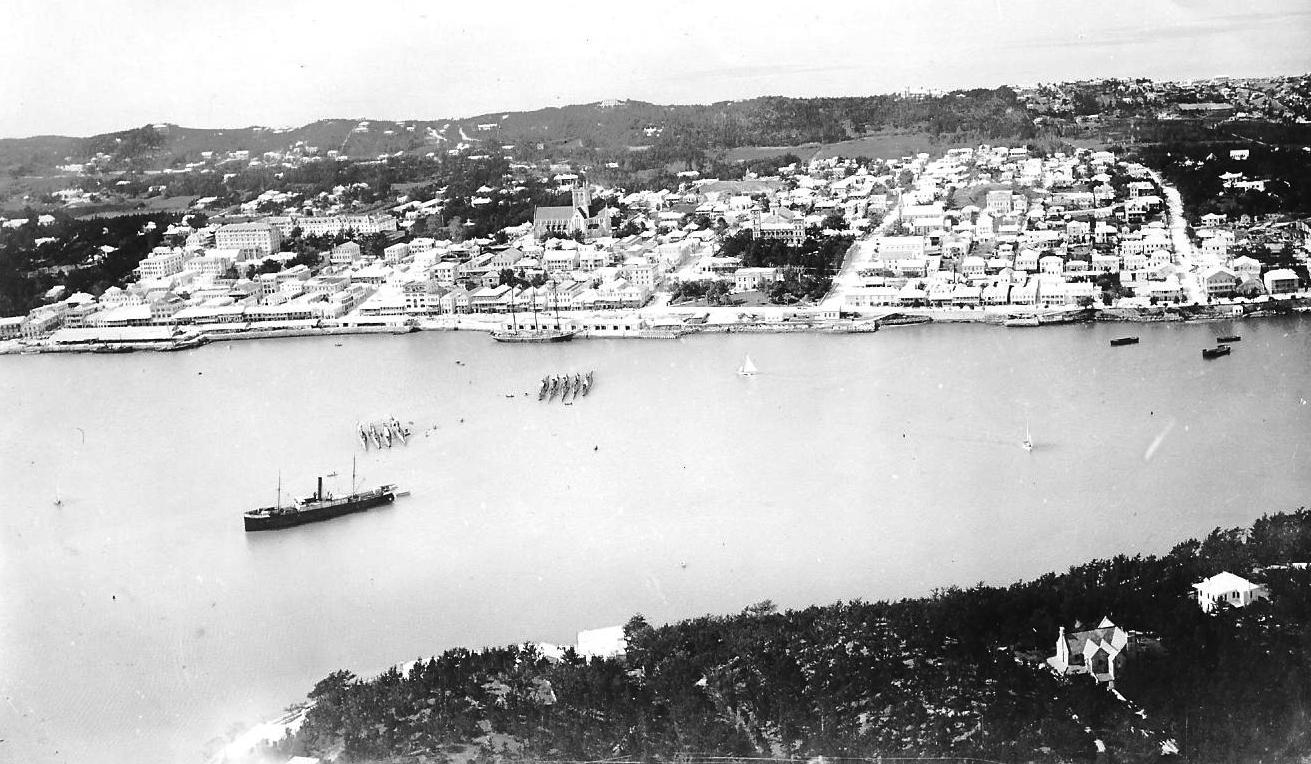
Hamilton Harbour in the mid-1920s.

Tourism in Bermuda first developed in Victorian times, catering to a wealthy elite seeking to escape North American winters. Many also came hoping to find young aristocrats among the officers of the Garrison and Naval base to whom they might marry their daughters. Local hoteliers were quick to exploit this, and organised many dances and gatherings during the 'season', to which military and naval officers were given a blanket invitation.

Due historically to a third of Bermuda's manpower being at sea at any one time, and to many of those seamen being lost at sea or ultimately settling elsewhere, especially as the Bermudian maritime industry began to suffer, the colony was noted for having a high proportion of unmarried women well into the 20th century. Many Bermudian women had traditionally wed naval or military officers. With the arrival of tourism, young local women had to compete with American girls. Most Bermudian women who married officers left Bermuda when their husbands were stationed elsewhere. Enlisted men married Bermudians, and many of those remained in Bermuda when they left the Army.

Bermudian advertisements stated that the island was cooler in the summer than resorts on the north Atlantic coast of North America. In the early 20th century, as modern transport and communication systems developed, Bermuda became a popular destination for American, Canadian and British tourists arriving by sea. The United States 1930 Smoot–Hawley Tariff Act enacted protective tariffs that cut off Bermuda's once-thriving export trade of fresh vegetables to the United States and encouraged its development of tourism as an alternative.

After several failed attempts, the first aeroplane reached Bermuda in 1930. A Stinson Detroiter seaplane flying from New York City, it had to land twice in the ocean: once because of darkness and again to refuel. Navigation and weather forecasting improved in 1933 when the Royal Air Force (then responsible for providing equipment and personnel for the Royal Navy's Fleet Air Arm) established a station at the Royal Naval Dockyard to repair (and supply replacement) float planes for the fleet. In 1936, Luft Hansa began to experiment with seaplane flights from Berlin via the Azores with continuation to New York City.

Imperial Airways and Pan American World Airways began operating scheduled flying-boat airline services from New York and Baltimore to Darrell's Island, Bermuda in 1937, by which time the summer had become more important for tourists making briefer visits. It was not until after the Second World War, when the first airport for landplanes was built and the advent of the Jet Age, that tourism fully realised its potential.

=== World Wars ===
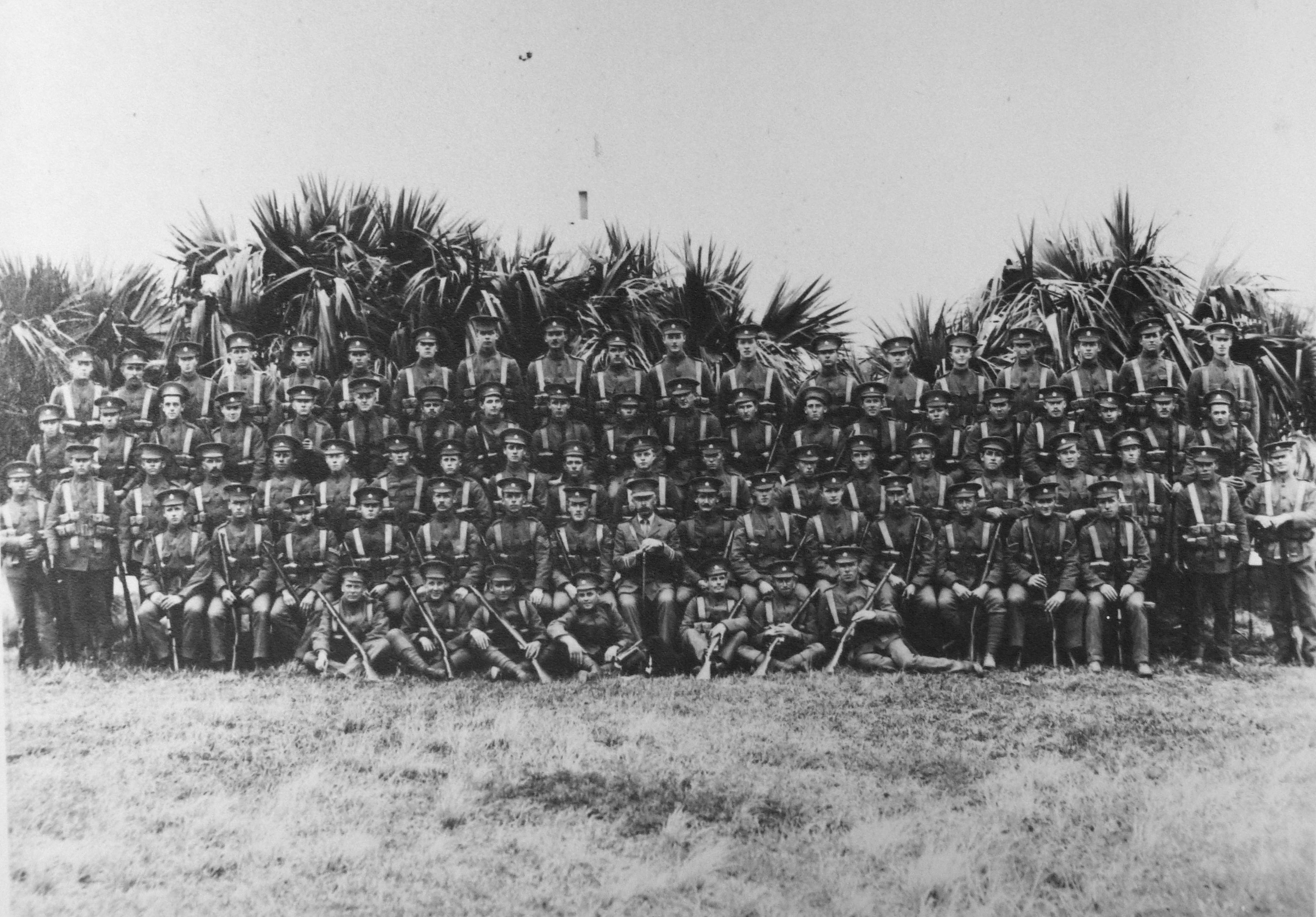
The Bermuda Volunteer Rifle Corps' First Contingent, raised in 1914 to serve in Belgium and France. By the war's end, the First and Second BVRC contingents together had lost over 75% of their combined strength.

Bermuda sent volunteer troops to fight in Europe with the British Army. They suffered severe losses. During the First World War, a number of Bermudians served in the Canadian Expeditionary Force.

During World War II, Bermuda's importance as a military base increased because of its location on the major trans-Atlantic shipping route. The Royal Naval dockyard on Ireland Island played a role similar to that it had during World War I, overseeing the formation of trans-Atlantic convoys composed of hundreds of ships. The military garrison, which included four local territorial units, maintained a guard against potential enemy attacks on the Island.

From 1939, the Royal Canadian Navy (RCN) worked with the RN to establish an anti-submarine training program at Casemates Barracks. In May 1940, Canada was asked to provide garrison support, with one company of The Winnipeg Grenadiers sailing from Halifax to relieve a company of the King's Shropshire Light Infantry. The Special Infantry Company of the Pictou Highlanders was mobilized on 10 September 1942 for service in Bermuda from 12 November 1942. In 1944, the RCN established a training base at the former Royal Navy base at Convict's Bay, St. George's, using a shore facility named HMCS Somers Isles. HMCS Somers Isles closed in 1945 and Canadian forces left Bermuda (temporarily) in 1946.

Bermuda became important for British Security Co-ordination operations with the ability to vet radio communication and search passengers and mail using flying boats to transit the Atlantic, with over 1,200 people working on opening packages secretly, finding coded messages, secret writing, micro dots and identifying spies working for Nazi Germany, Fascist Italy and Vichy France in the Americas, much of the information found being passed to the FBI. The Island was a base for direction finding equipment to help identify locations of German submarines and took down Enigma encoded messages, which were sent for Cryptanalysis of the Enigma to Bletchley Park.

In 1941, the United States signed the destroyers-for-bases deal with the United Kingdom, giving the British surplus U.S. Navy destroyers in exchange for 99-year lease rights to establish naval and air bases in certain British territories. Although not included in this trade, Winston Churchill granted the US similar 99-year leases "freely and without consideration" in both Bermuda and Newfoundland. (The commonly held belief that the Bermudian bases were part of the trade is not correct.) The advantage for Britain of granting these base rights was that the neutral US effectively took responsibility for the security of these territories, freeing British forces to be deployed to the sharper ends of the War. The terms of the base rights granted for Bermuda provided that the airfield constructed by the US would be used jointly with the Royal Air Force (RAF).

The Bermuda bases consisted of 5.8 km^{2} (2.2 sq mi) of land, largely reclaimed from the sea. The USAAF airfield, Fort Bell (later, US Air Force Base Kindley Field, and, later still, US Naval Air Station Bermuda) was on St. David's Island, while the Naval Operations Base, a Naval Air Station for maritime patrol flying boats, (which became the Naval Air Station Annex after US Naval air operations relocated to ) was at the western end of the island in the Great Sound. These joined two other air stations already operating on Bermuda, the pre-war civil airport on Darrell's Island, which had been taken over by the RAF, and the Fleet Air Arm's Royal Naval Air Station, HMS Malabar, on Boaz Island.

== Post-war history ==
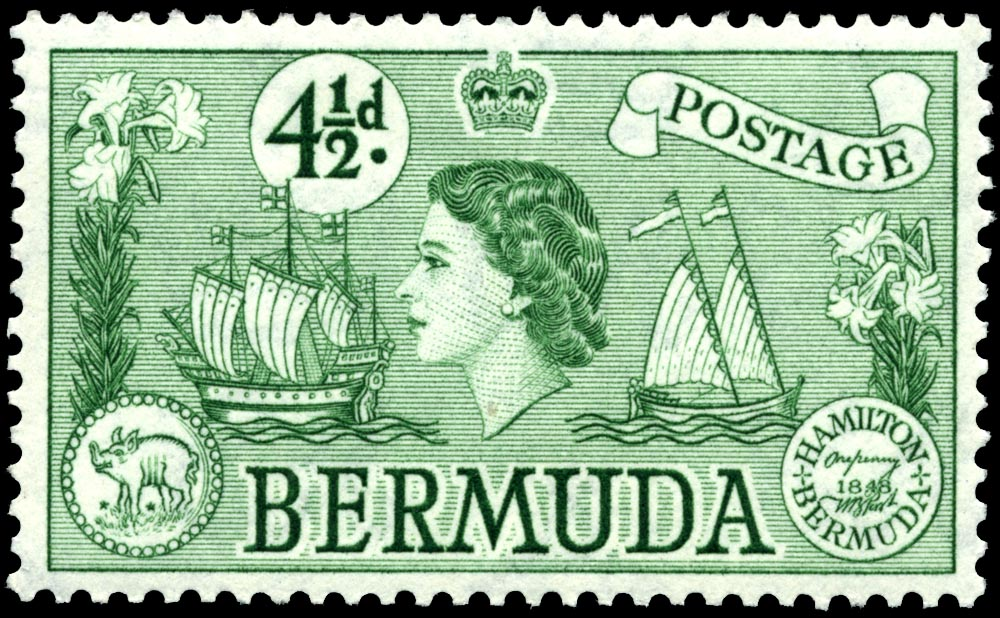
Postage stamp with portrait of Bermudian bases, 1953

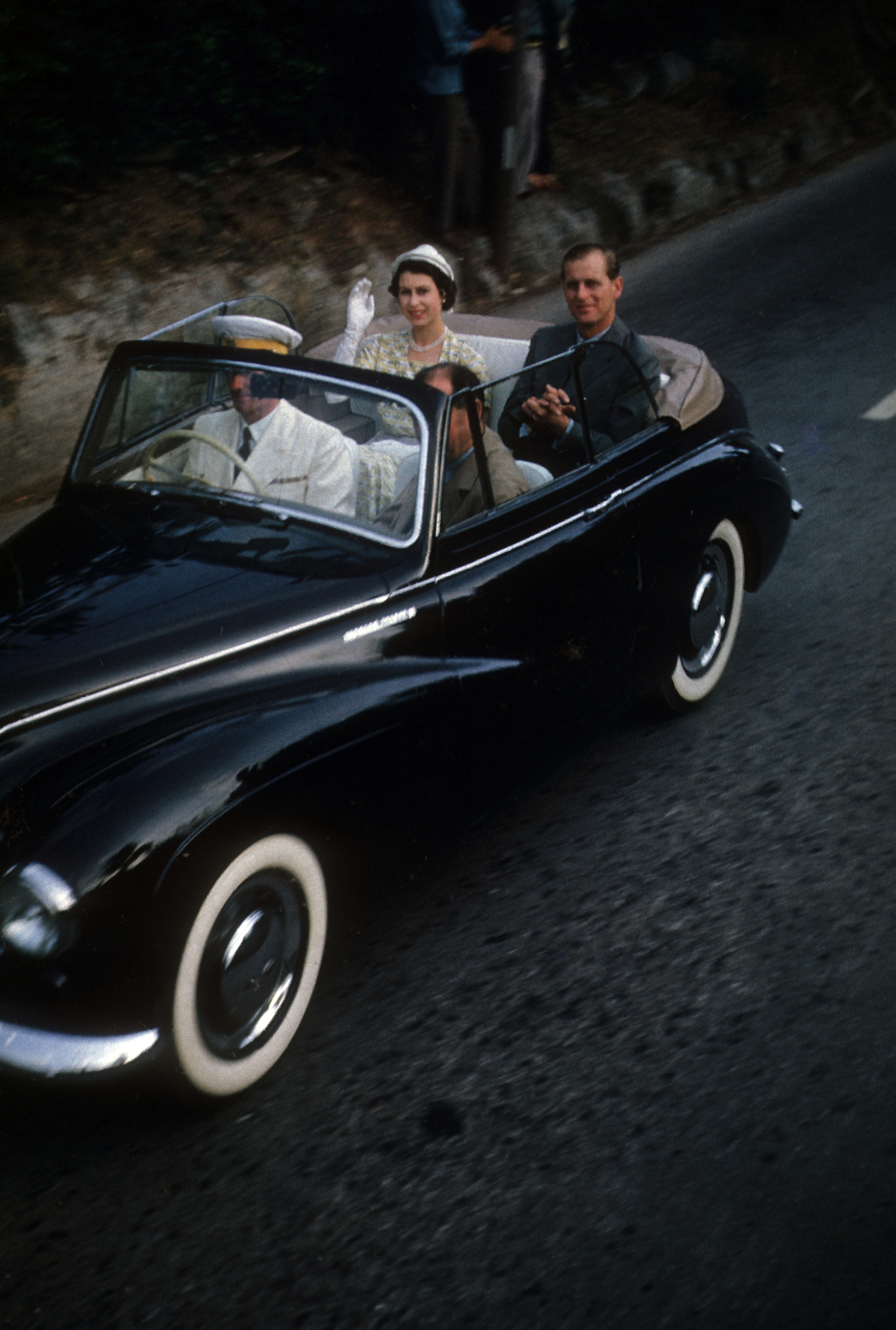
Queen Elizabeth II and Prince Philip visiting Bermuda in 1953.

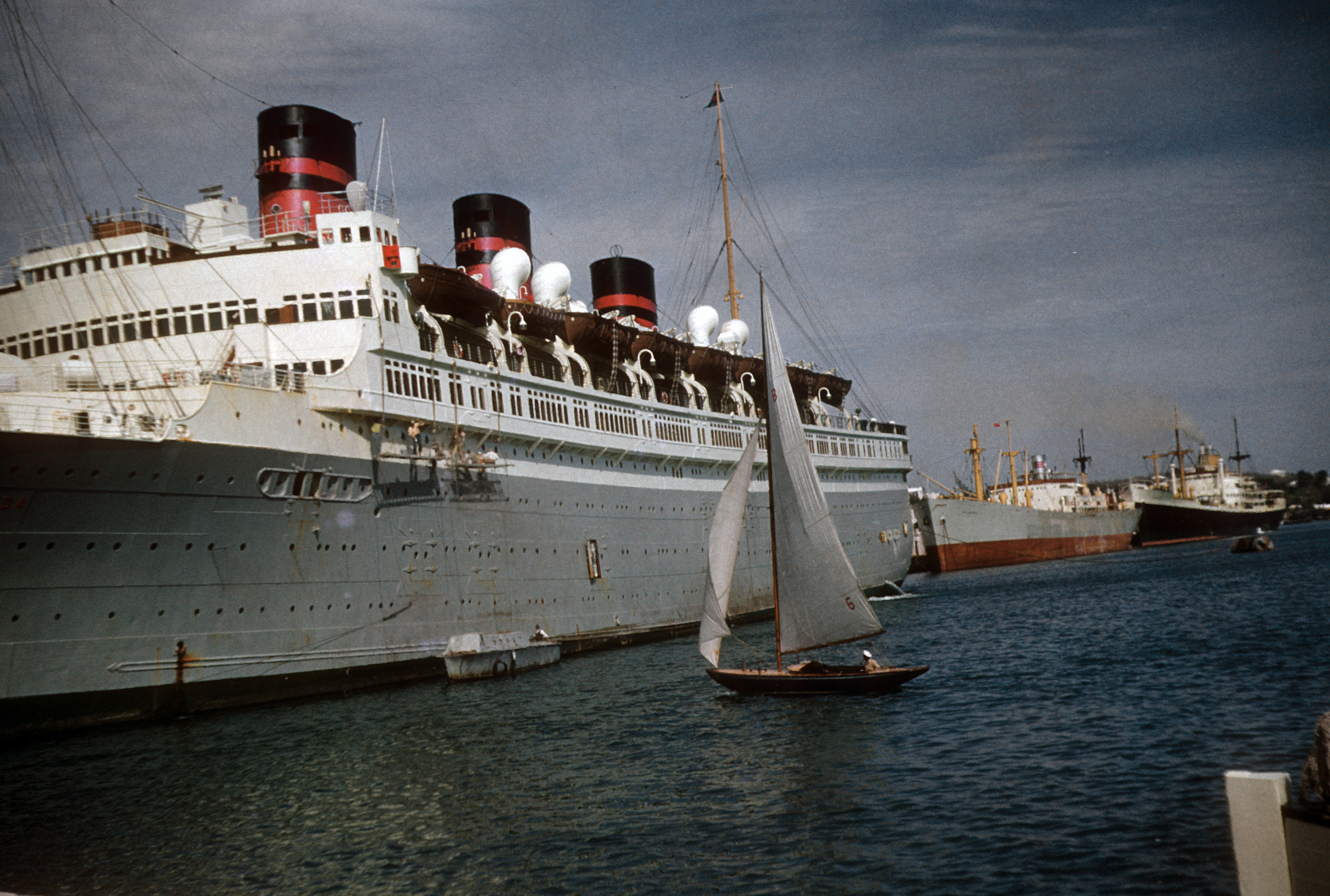
The SS Queen of Bermuda in Hamilton Harbour, December 1952 / January 1953.

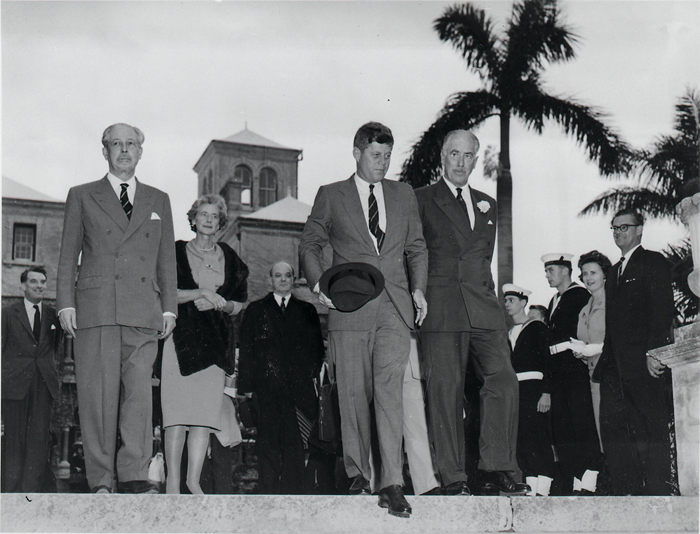
The famously hatless President Kennedy leaves Government House in Bermuda clutching a fedora followed by British Prime Minister Harold Macmillan and his wife Dorothy. Macmillan was keen to negotiate British access to American nuclear technology.

Bermuda has prospered economically since World War II, developing into a highly successful offshore financial centre. Although tourism remains important to Bermuda's economy, it has for three decades been second to international business in terms of economic importance to the island.

The Royal Naval Dockyard, and the attendant military garrison, continued to be important to Bermuda's economy until the mid-20th century. In addition to considerable building work, the armed forces needed to source food and other materials from local vendors. Beginning in World War II, US military installations also were located in Bermuda (see "Military" section below and Military of Bermuda). On 1 September 1995, both US military bases were closed; British and Canadian bases also closed at about the same time. Unresolved issues concerning the 1995 withdrawal of US forces—primarily related to environmental factors—delayed the formal return of the base lands to the Government of Bermuda. The United States formally returned the base lands in 2002.

In 1948, regularly scheduled commercial airline service by land-based aeroplanes began to Kindley Field (now L.F. Wade International Airport), helping tourism to reach its peak in the 1960s–1970s. By the end of the 1970s, international business had supplanted tourism as the dominant sector of Bermuda's economy (see Economy of Bermuda).

Universal adult suffrage and the development of a two-party political system occurred in the 1960s. Before universal suffrage, adopted as part of Bermuda's Constitution in 1967, voting was dependent on a certain level of property ownership. On 10 March 1973, the Governor of Bermuda Richard Sharples was assassinated along with his aide-de-camp by local Black Power militants. Erskine Burrows was found guilty of this assassination. His hanging, on 2 December 1977 was followed by three days of riots. In 1981 the island saw its only general strike.

Though Bermuda has been classified as a self-governed colony since 1620, internal self-government was bolstered by the establishment of a formal constitution in 1968, and the introduction of universal adult suffrage; debate about independence has ensued, although a 1995 independence referendum was soundly defeated. For many, Bermudian independence would mean little other than the obligation to staff foreign missions and embassies around the world, which would be a heavy obligation for Bermuda's small population, and the loss of British passports (which could severely restrict travel, as few enough countries have even heard of little Bermuda, and could regard travellers with suspicion). Another concern, which raised its head during the 1991 Gulf War, was the loss of the protection provided by the Royal Navy, especially to the large number of merchant vessels on Bermuda's shipping register. The Bermuda government is unlikely to be able to provide naval protection to oil tankers plying the Persian Gulf or other potentially dangerous waters. At present, Bermuda is able to take advantage of its status as an overseas territory of the United Kingdom to attract overseas shipping operators to its register, although it does not contribute to the navy's budget. With independence, it was feared a large chunk of the money currently flowing into the Bermuda Government's coffers would disappear. The current government is promoting independence – by means of a general election (that is, the government of the day would have the power to decide whether to go independent or not) as opposed to a referendum (a direct vote by the people) – by establishing a committee to investigate (though the committee is notably staffed with party members, and without representation by the opposition party). This stance is being supported by the United Nations, who have sent delegations to the island claiming that Bermuda is being suppressed by the British.

== 21st century ==
The island suffered major damage from Hurricane Fabian in 2003. It was also hit by Hurricane Bertha in July 2008, Hurricanes Fay and Gonzalo in September 2014, Hurricane Joaquin in October 2015, and Hurricane Nicole in October 2016.

At the 2020 Summer Olympics, Bermuda became the smallest overseas territory to earn a gold medal, as Flora Duffy won Bermuda´s first ever olympic gold medal, in the women's triathlon.

== Notable historical figures ==
=== until 1700 ===
- Henry Woodhouse (1573 in Norfolk – 1637 in Norfolk) was Governor of Bermuda between 1623 and 1627
- Philip Bell (1590 in Norfolk – 1678 in Norfolk) was Governor of Bermuda from 1626 to 1629, of the Providence Island colony from 1629 to 1636, and of Barbados from 1640 to 1650
- George Starkey (1628 in Bermuda – 1665 in London) was a Colonial American alchemist, medical practitioner, and writer of numerous commentaries and chemical treatises
- John Bowen (c.1660 in Bermuda – 1704 Mascarene Islands) was a pirate of Créole origin active during the Golden Age of Piracy
- Sir Charles Hotham, 4th Baronet (c.1663 in Bermuda – 1723) was a British Army officer and Member of Parliament for Scarborough from 1695 to 1701 and for Beverley from 1702 to 1723
- Sybilla Masters (c.1676 in Bermuda – 1720) was an American inventor. Masters was the first person residing in the American colonies to be given an English patent

=== 1700 to 1800 ===
- St. George Tucker (1752 near Port Royal, Bermuda – 1827 Warminster, Virginia) was a lawyer and after the American Revolution, a professor of law at the College of William and Mary
- Hezekiah Frith (1763 in Bermuda – 1848) was a wealthy British ship owner with the reputation of a "gentleman privateer", who engaged in piracy during the 1790s. He built the Spithead House in Warwick, Bermuda
- John Dunscombe (1777 in Bermuda – 1847 in Liverpool) was a merchant and political figure in Newfoundland. He came to Newfoundland in 1808 and became a member of the Executive Council from 1833 to 1842
- Captain Charles Stuart (1783 in Bermuda – 1865 in Canada) was an Anglo-Canadian abolitionist. After leaving the army, he was a writer, but was notable for his opposition to slavery.
- John R. Cooke (1788 in Bermuda – 1854) was a nineteenth-century American politician from Virginia.

=== 1800 to 1900 ===
- Augustus William Harvey (1839 in Bermuda – 1903) was an industrialist and politician in Newfoundland. came to Newfoundland in 1853 and served in the Legislative Council of Newfoundland from 1870 to 1895
- Ernest Graham Ingham (1851 in Bermuda – 1926) was an eminent Anglican bishop and author
- Mary Ewing Outerbridge (1852–1886) was an American woman who imported the game of lawn tennis to the US from Bermuda
- John Smith (born 1854 in Bermuda – ??) was a United States Navy sailor and a recipient of America's highest military decoration, the Medal of Honor.
- Frank Percy Crozier CB, CMG, DSO (1879 in Bermuda – 1937 in London) was a British military officer who courted controversy
- Ernest Trimingham (1880 in Bermuda – 1942) was an actor from Bermuda. He was one of the first black actors in British cinema.
- Edgar F. Gordon (1895 in Port of Spain, Trinidad – 1955 in Bermuda) was a physician, parliamentarian, civil rights activist and labour leader in Bermuda

== See also ==
- British North America
- British colonization of the Americas
- History
- History of North America
- History of the Americas
- History of the Caribbean
