= Bermuda Day =

Public holiday in Bermuda

Bermuda Day is a public holiday in the islands of Bermuda. It is celebrated on the fourth Friday in May.

Bermuda Day is traditionally the first day of the year that residents will go into the sea. It is also traditionally the first day on which Bermuda shorts are worn as business attire (although in recent years, Bermuda shorts are increasingly worn at any time of the year). Many people also see Bermuda Day as the first day on which they can go out on the water after the winter — consequently there is always a rush to get one's boat 'in de water' before Bermuda Day.

To celebrate the holiday, there is a parade in Hamilton, Bermuda, and a road race from the west end of the island into Hamilton. For the first time, in 2015, the race started from St George's and into Hamilton. These events are popular with spectators, and residents are known to stake out particular sections of the pavements to enable them to watch the runners and the floats. Ways of marking out one's family's section can include roping it off (frowned on as people have been hurt walking into them the night before), marking it off with tape with one's name on it, or sleeping there overnight.

== History ==
The parade first took place in 1979. It traditionally was on the 24th of May or the following Monday, if it fell on a weekend. In November 2017, the law was changed to move it to the last Friday in May, starting 2018. It therefore took place on the 25th of May 2018. In December of 2018, the Governor announced that in 2019 it shall not take place on the 31st of May, as it was announced at the beginning, but rather it shall take place one week earlier on Friday, 24th of May 2019, the historic date. The law was then again changed in 2020, that starting 2021 it shall be scheduled the way it is now.
