= Mary Prince =

West Indian writer and enslaved woman (c. 1788–after 1833)

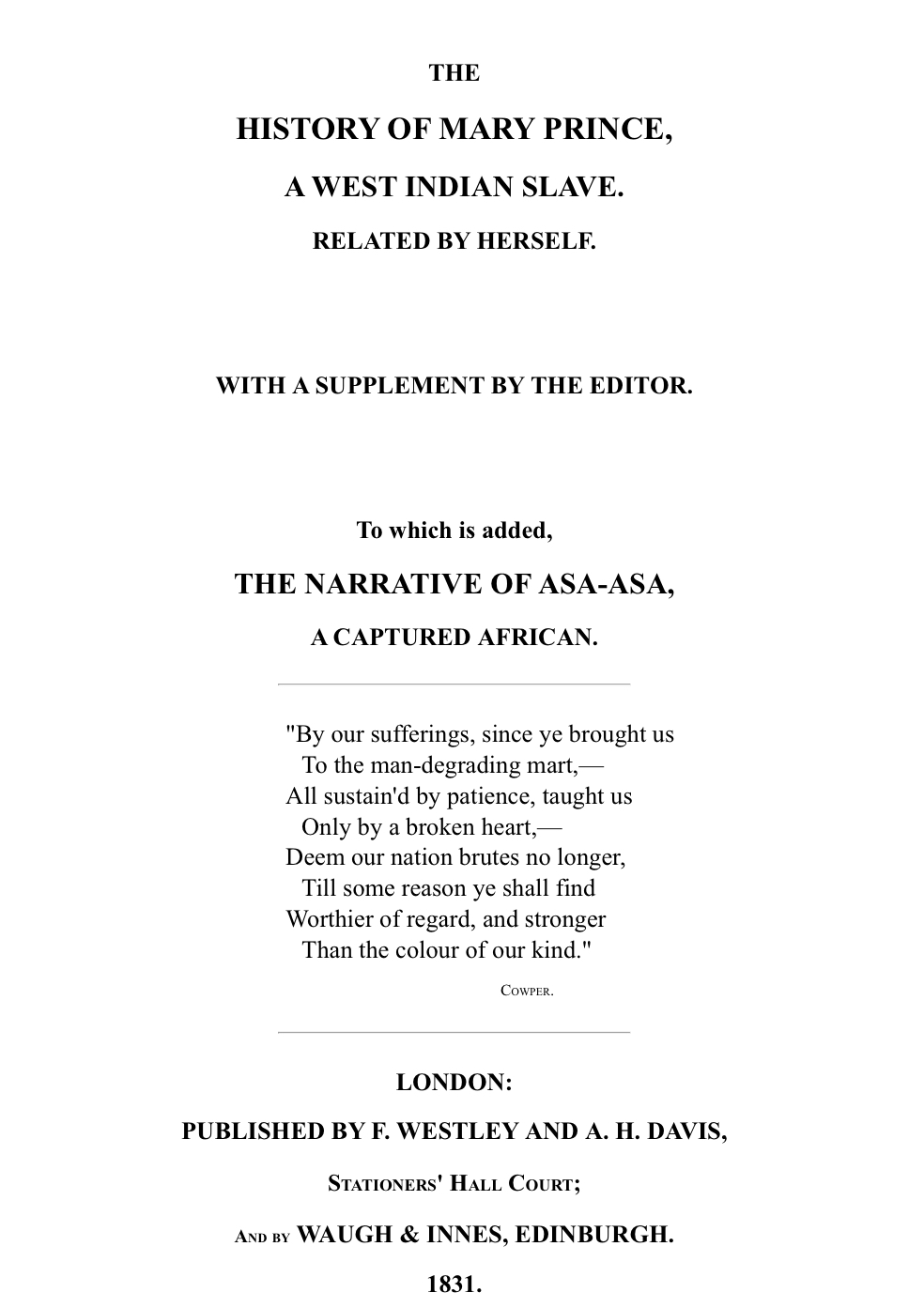
First edition cover (recreation)

Mary Prince (c. 1 October 1788 – after 1833) was the first black woman to publish an autobiography of her experience as a slave, born in the colony of Bermuda to an enslaved family of African descent. After being sold a number of times and being moved around the Caribbean, she was brought to England as a servant in 1828, and later left her enslaver.

Prince was illiterate, but while she was living in London she dictated her life story to Susanna Strickland, a young lady living in the home of Thomas Pringle, secretary of the Society for the Mitigation and Gradual Abolition of Slavery Throughout the British Dominions (aka Anti-Slavery Society, 1823–1838). Strickland wrote down her slave narrative which was published as The History of Mary Prince in 1831, the first account of the life of a Black enslaved woman to be published in the United Kingdom. This first-hand description of the brutalities of enslavement, published at a time when slavery was still legal in Bermuda and British Caribbean colonies, had a galvanising effect on the British anti-slavery movement. It was reprinted twice in its first year.

== Early life and education ==
Mary Prince was born enslaved at Brackish Pond, Devonshire Parish, Bermuda. Her father (whose only given name was Prince) was a sawyer enslaved by David Trimmingham, and her mother a house-servant held by Charles Myners. She had three younger brothers and two sisters, Hannah and Dinah. When Myners died in 1788, Mary Prince, her mother and siblings were sold as household servants to Captain George Darrell. He gave Mary and her mother to his daughter, with Mary becoming the companion servant of his young granddaughter, Betsey Williams.

At the age of 12, Mary was sold for £38 sterling (2021: ~£3,300; ~US$4,500) to Captain John Ingham, of Spanish Point. Her two sisters were also sold that same day, all to different slave traders. Mary's new enslaver and his wife were cruel and often lost their tempers, and Mary and others were often severely flogged for minor offences.

Mary Prince was sold before 1803 at auction for £100 Bermudian currency by Robert Darell. The Bermudians had used slaves seasonally for a century for the extraction of salt from sea water. The production of salt for export was a pillar of the Bermudian economy, but the production was labour-intensive. Originally, raking had been performed by whites due to the fear of enslaved people being seized by Spanish and French raiders (enslaved persons were considered property, and could be seized as such during hostilities). Blacks crewed the Bermuda sloops that delivered the rakers to and from the Turks Islands and delivered salt to markets in North America, engaging in maritime activities while the whites raked. When the threats posed by the Spanish and French in the region decreased; however, the enslaved people were put to work in the salt pans.

As a child Mary worked in poor conditions in the salt ponds up to her knees in water. Due to the nature of salt mining, Mary and others were often forced to work up to 17 hours straight as owners of the ponds were concerned that if the workers were gone for too long rain would come and soil the salt. Generally, men were the salt rakers, forced to work in the salt ponds, where they were exposed to the sun and heat, as well as the salt in the pans, which ate away at their uncovered legs. Women did the easier packaging of salt.

Mary Prince was returned to Bermuda in 1812, where Robert Darrell had moved with his daughter. While here, she said in her account that she was physically abused by Darrell and forced to bathe him under threat of further beatings. Mary resisted Darrell's abuse on two occasions: once, in defence of his daughter, whom he also beat; the second time, defending herself from Darrell when he beat her for dropping kitchen utensils. After this, she left his direct service and was hired out to Cedar Hill for a time, where she earned money for her enslaver by washing clothes.

In 1815, Mary was sold a fourth time, to John Adams Wood of Antigua for $300 (2021: ~£3,900; ~$5,300). She worked in his household as a domestic slave, attending the bedchambers, nursing a young child, and washing clothes. There she began to suffer from rheumatism, which left her unable to work. When Adams Wood was travelling, Mary earned money for herself by taking in washing and by selling coffee, yams and other provisions to ships.

In Antigua, she joined the Moravian Church, where she also attended classes and learned to read. She was baptised in the English church in 1817 and accepted for communion, but she was afraid to ask Adams Wood for permission to attend. In December 1826 at Spring Garden Moravian Church, Prince married Daniel James, a former enslaved man who had bought his freedom by saving money from his work. He worked as a carpenter and cooper. According to Mary, her floggings increased after her marriage because Adams Wood and his wife did not want a free black man living on their property.

== Travel to England ==
In 1828, Adams Wood and his family travelled to London, visiting and arranging their son's education, and to bring their daughters home to the islands. At her request, they took Mary Prince with them as a servant. Although she had served the Woods for more than ten years, they had increasing conflict in England. Four times Wood told her to obey or leave. They gave her a letter that nominally gave her the right to leave but suggested that no one should hire her.

After leaving the household, Prince took shelter with the Moravian church in Hatton Garden. Within a few weeks, she started working occasionally for Thomas Pringle, an abolitionist writer, and Secretary to the Anti-Slavery Society, which offered assistance to black people in need. Prince found work with the Forsyth household, but the couple moved away from England in 1829. The Woods also left England in 1829 and returned with their daughter to Antigua. Pringle tried to arrange to have Wood manumit Prince, so she would have legal freedom.

In 1829, Adams Wood refused either to manumit Mary Prince or allow her to be purchased out of his control. His refusal to sell or free her meant that as long as slavery remained legal in Antigua, Prince could not return to her husband and friends without being re-enslaved and submitting to Wood's power. After trying to arrange a compromise, the Anti-Slavery Committee proposed to petition Parliament to grant Prince's manumission, but did not succeed. At the same time, a bill was introduced to free all enslaved people from the West Indies in England whose enslavers had freely brought them there; it did not pass but was an indication of growing anti-slavery sentiment.

In December 1829, Pringle hired Prince to work in his own household. Encouraged by Pringle, Prince arranged for her life narrative to be transcribed by Susanna Strickland, a writer better known under her later married name as Susanna Moodie. Pringle served as editor, and her book was published in 1831 as The History of Mary Prince. The book caused a commotion as it was the first account published in Great Britain of a Black enslaved woman's life; at a time when anti-slavery agitation was growing, her first person account touched many people. In the first year, it sold out three printings.

Two libel cases arose out of it, and Prince was called to testify at each.

She is known to have remained in England until at least 1833, when she testified in the two Washington cases. That year, the Slavery Abolition Act 1833 was passed, to be effective August 1834. In 1808, Parliament had passed the Slave Trade Act 1807, which outlawed the slave trade but not slavery itself. The 1833 law was intended to achieve a two-staged abolition of West Indian slavery by 1840, allowing the colonies time to transition their economies. Because of popular protests in the West Indies among the freedmen, the colonies legally completed abolition two years early in 1838.

== The History of Mary Prince ==
When Prince's book was published, slavery, though never legal in England, was both legal and widespread throughout the British Empire. There was considerable uncertainty about the political and economic repercussions that might arise if the British government abolished slavery in its overseas possessions, as the West Indian colonies depended on it for labour to raise their lucrative commodity crop. As a personal account, the book contributed to the debate in a manner different from reasoned analysis or statistical arguments. Its tone was direct and authentic, and its simple but vivid prose contrasted with the more laboured literary style of the day.

An example is Prince's description of being sold away from her mother at a young age:

It was night when I reached my new home. The house was large, and built at the bottom of a very high hill; but I could not see much of it that night. I saw too much of it afterwards. The stones and the timber were the best things in it; they were not so hard as the hearts of the owners.

Prince wrote of slavery with the authority of personal experience, something her political opponents could never match. She wrote:

I have been a slave myself—I know what slaves feel—I can tell by myself what other slaves feel, and by what they have told me. The man that says slaves be quite happy in slavery—that they don't want to be free—that man is either ignorant or a lying person. I never heard a slave say so. I never heard a Buckra (white) man say so, till I heard tell of it in England.

Her book had an immediate effect on public opinion and was published in three impressions the first year. It generated controversy, and James MacQueen, the editor of The Glasgow Courier, challenged its accuracy by a lengthy letter in Blackwood's Magazine. MacQueen was a defender of white West Indian interests and vigorous critic of the anti-slavery movement. He depicted Prince as a woman of low morals who had been the "despicable tool" of the anti-slavery clique, who had incited her to malign her "generous and indulgent owners." He attacked the character of the Pringle family, suggesting they were at fault for accepting the slave in their household.

In 1833, Pringle sued MacQueen for libel, receiving damages of £5. Not long afterwards, John Wood, Prince's enslaver, sued Pringle for libel, holding him responsible as the editor of Prince's The History, and saying the book generally misrepresented his character. Wood won his case and was awarded £25 in damages. Prince was called to testify in both these trials, but little is known of her life after this.

== Anti-Slavery Society ==
- The Anti-Slavery Society (1823–1838) was founded in the city of London and ceased to exist by 1838 but is commonly referred to as the London Anti-Slavery society.
- Although slave trading across the British Empire was banned through the Slave Trade Act of 1807, no real change occurred from it, so abolitionist groups such as the Anti-Slavery society began to form as a result.
- The Anti-Slavery society was formed much after slave abolishment and anti-slave groups were formed in London, but forming one strong group that could have a louder voice was what the society was going for. The society consisted of many groups like ones that rose from transatlantic slave trade and local groups all with one common goal, to abolish slavery as a whole. Many influential leaders supported this movement in played a big role in getting people to come together such as Thomas Clarkson and William Wilberforce.
- Public campaigns were held on the streets of London to rally more people to believe in the movement, and they use pamphlets, speeches, and publications, to show the general public how inhumane and wrong slavery was.
- The society also got involved internationally, mostly with the United States and other world powers and people that had a common belief.
- The society was deeply rooted with Christian beliefs, but opinions varied between older members and newer members. The older abolitionists believed in the gradual shift from slavery to all people being free which had great success. The younger crowd was more extreme with their opinions however, they thought slavery was a sinful act and needed to end immediately.
- Slavery was formally outlawed in England on 1 August 1834, but that date did not really mark the end. Many other acts of enslavement continued until the late 1830s and early 1840s, which is about when the Anti-Slavery Society ceased to exist, showing how their acts against slavery and putting out information such as the "Life of Mary Prince" shifted the views on slavery in England significantly.

== Legacy ==
- On 26 October 2007, a commemorative plaque organised by the Nubian Jak Community Trust was unveiled in Bloomsbury in London, where Mary Prince once lived.
- Also in 2007, the Museum in Docklands opened a new gallery and permanent exhibition entitled London, Sugar & Slavery, which credits Prince as an author who "played a crucial role in the abolition campaign".

== Representations in other media ==
- Prince is featured as the fictional love interest in the jazz opera Bridgetower – A Fable of 1807 (2007), by Julian Joseph with libretto by Mike Phillips, about the 18th-century black violinist George Bridgetower.
- In the UK and Republic of Ireland, and in parts of Europe and South America, Prince was the subject of a Google Doodle on Monday 1 October 2018 to mark her 230th birthday.
- Mary Prince Dictating to Susanna Strickland is the title of a 2023 painting by Kimathi Donkor which was exhibited in Rise Up: Resistance, Revolution, Abolition at the Fitzwilliam Museum in Cambridge, England in 2025. The painting was celebrated in the award-winning, 2025 documentary short This Woman Does not Exist by Bermudian film-maker Ari Kamara.

== See also ==
- Denmark Vesey
- Ottobah Cugoano
- Olaudah Equiano
- Cesar Picton
- Charles Stuart (abolitionist)
- List of slaves
- List of abolitionists

== Bibliography ==
- The History of Mary Prince: A West Indian Slave at Project Gutenberg.
- The History of Mary Prince: A West Indian Slave, F. Westley and A. H. Davis (eds). 1831. Archived 15 August 2019 at the Wayback Machine. Online HTML edition, New York Public Library.
- The History of Mary Prince; many printed editions are available, both in and out of print.
- Boos, Florence. Memoirs of Victorian Working-Class Women: The Hard Way Up. Palgrave, 2017. Chapter 3 is devoted to Mary Prince and Elizabeth Storie.
- Prince, Mary (2017). The History of Mary Prince, a West Indian Slave Related by Herself. University of North Carolina Press.
