= List of Bermuda-related topics =

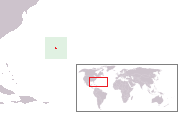
The location of the British Overseas Territory of the Bermuda Islands

The following is an outline of topics related to the British Overseas Territory of the Bermuda Islands.

== Bermuda ==
- Bermuda
- Bermuda Police Service
- Bermuda Triangle
- Bermudian architecture
- Demographics of Bermuda
- Charles Elliot
- Flag of Bermuda
- HMS Bermuda
- Hail to Bermuda
- ISO 3166-1 alpha-2 country code for Bermuda: BM
- ISO 3166-1 alpha-3 country code for Bermuda: BMU
- Jamestown, Virginia
- Johnny Barnes
- Law of Bermuda
- List of Bermuda Triangle incidents
- Template:Bermuda
- Tudor Hill Laboratory
- USN NAS Bermuda, Kindley Field, 1970-1995
- USN NAS Bermuda/NAS Annex, Morgans Point, 1941-1995
- U.S. Naval Facility Bermuda

== Buildings and structures in Bermuda ==
- 9 Beaches resort
- The Fairmont Hamilton Princess
- Royal Naval Dockyard, Bermuda

=== Bridges in Bermuda ===
- Somerset Bridge, Bermuda

=== Houses in Bermuda ===
- Ashley House (Paget Parish, Bermuda)

=== Official residences in Bermuda ===
- Government House, Bermuda

== Communications in Bermuda ==
- Communications in Bermuda
- .bm Internet country code top-level domain for Bermuda

=== Area codes in Bermuda ===
- List of NANP area codes
- Area code 441

=== Bermudian media ===
- Bermuda Broadcasting

==== Television stations in Bermuda ====
- Bermuda Broadcasting
- List of television stations in Bermuda
- Template:Bermuda TV
- VSB-TV
- ZBM-TV
- ZFB-TV

== Bermudian culture ==
- Culture of Bermuda
- Bermudian English
- Coat of arms of Bermuda
- Public holidays in Bermuda
- Victoria Park, Hamilton

=== Bermudian writers ===
- Angela Barry
- Brian Burland
- Dale Butler
- Mary Prince
- Ira Philip
- Elizabeth Mulderig
- Eva Hodgson
- Larry Burchall
- Randolph Williams
- Stewart Hayward

==== Bermudian songwriters ====
===== Bermudian singer-songwriters =====
- Clinark (Clinarke Dill)
- Collie budz a.k.a. Colin Harper
- Eldon Raynor Jr
- Heather Nova
- Hubert Smith

== Economy of Bermuda ==
- Economy of Bermuda
- Bermuda Monetary Authority
- Bermuda Stock Exchange
- Currency of Bermuda: Bermudian Dollar (formerly Bermudian pound)
  - ISO 4217: BMD

=== Companies of Bermuda ===
==== Banks of Bermuda ====
- The Bank of Bermuda

==== Companies listed on the Bermuda Stock Exchange ====
- ACE Ltd.
- HSBC

==== Insurance companies of Bermuda ====
- ACE Ltd.
- MS Frontier Reinsurance

=== Trade unions of Bermuda ===
- Bermuda Industrial Union
- Bermuda Public Services Association

== Education in Bermuda ==
- Bermuda Biological Station for Research

=== Schools in Bermuda ===
Private Schools

- Bermuda High School for Girls
- Saltus Grammar School
- Somersfield Academy
- Bermuda Institute
- Warwick Academy
- Mount Saint Agnes Academy

Public Primary Schools

- East End Primary
- West Pembroke Primary
- Victor Scott
- Paget Primary
- Gilbert Institute
- Port Royal Primary
- Francis Patton Primary
- Dalton E. Tucker
- Somerset Primary
- West End Primary
- Purvis Primary
- St. David's Primary
- Prospect Primary
- Elliot Primary
- Harrington Sound Primary
- Heron Bay Primary
- Northlands Primary
- St. Georges Preparatory

Public Middle Schools

- Clearwater Middle School
- Dellwood Middle School
- Sandys Secondary Middle School
- T.N. Tatem Middle School
- Whitney Institute Middle School

== Religion in Bermuda ==
Anglican Church of Bermuda

== Environment of Bermuda ==
=== Biota of Bermuda ===
- Flora and fauna in Bermuda

=== Conservation in Bermuda ===
- Bermuda National Trust

=== Natural history of Bermuda ===
- Bermuda petrel
- Bermuda rock skink
- Common ground dove
- Eastern bluebird
- Gray catbird
- Great kiskadee
- Mourning dove
- Northern cardinal
- White-eyed vireo
- White-tailed tropicbird
- Yellow-crowned night heron

== Geography of Bermuda ==
- Geography of Bermuda
- Annie's Bay, Bermuda
- Bermuda Botanical Gardens
- Boaz Island, Bermuda
- Castle Harbor, Bermuda
- Castle Island, Bermuda
- Church Bay, Bermuda
- Coney Island, Bermuda
- Cooper's Island, Bermuda
- Crystal Cave, Bermuda
- Darrell's Island, Bermuda
- Devil's Hole, Bermuda
- Elbow Beach, Bermuda
- Ferry Reach, Bermuda
- Flatt's Inlet, Bermuda
- Flatts Village, Bermuda
- Great Sound, Bermuda
- Gunner Bay, Bermuda
- Hamilton Harbor, Bermuda
- Hamilton, Bermuda
- Harrington Sound, Bermuda
- Hawkins Island, Bermuda
- Hinson's Island, Bermuda
- Horseshoe Bay, Bermuda
- Ireland Island, Bermuda
- Islands of Bermuda
- Little Sound, Bermuda
- Long Island, Bermuda
- Mangrove Lake (Bermuda)
- Marshall's Island, Bermuda
- Nonsuch Island, Bermuda
- Ordnance Island, Bermuda
- Paget Island, Bermuda
- Places of interest in Bermuda
- Salt Kettle, Bermuda
- Smith's Island, Bermuda
- Somerset Island, Bermuda
- Somerset, Bermuda
- Spanish Point, Bermuda
- Spittal Pond, Bermuda
- St. David's Head, Bermuda
- St. David's Island, Bermuda
- St. George's Harbor, Bermuda
- St. George's Island, Bermuda
- St. George's, Bermuda
- The Causeway, Bermuda
- Tobacco Bay, Bermuda
- Trott's Pond (Bermuda)
- Trunk Island, Bermuda
- Tucker's Town Peninsula, Bermuda
- Tucker's Town, Bermuda
- Victoria Park, Hamilton
- Warwick Parish, Bermuda

=== Bermuda geography stubs ===
- Annie's Bay, Bermuda
- Bermuda Botanical Gardens
- Bermuda International Airport
- Castle Harbor, Bermuda
- Castle Island, Bermuda
- Church Bay, Bermuda
- Coney Island, Bermuda
- Cooper's Island, Bermuda
- Crystal Cave, Bermuda
- Devil's Hole, Bermuda
- Devonshire Parish, Bermuda
- Elbow Beach, Bermuda
- Ferry Reach, Bermuda
- Flatt's Inlet, Bermuda
- Flatts Village, Bermuda
- Great Sound, Bermuda
- Gunner Bay, Bermuda
- Hamilton Harbor, Bermuda
- Hamilton Parish, Bermuda
- Hamilton, Bermuda
- Harrington Sound, Bermuda
- Hawkins Island, Bermuda
- Hinson's Island, Bermuda
- Horseshoe Bay, Bermuda
- Ireland Island, Bermuda
- List of cities in Bermuda
- Little Sound, Bermuda
- Long Island, Bermuda
- Mangrove Lake (Bermuda)
- Marshall's Island, Bermuda
- Nonsuch Island, Bermuda
- Ordnance Island, Bermuda
- Paget Island, Bermuda
- Paget Parish, Bermuda
- Pembroke Parish, Bermuda
- Salt Kettle, Bermuda
- Sandys Parish, Bermuda
- Smith's Island, Bermuda
- Somerset Island, Bermuda
- Somerset, Bermuda
- Southampton Parish, Bermuda
- Spanish Point, Bermuda
- Spittal Pond, Bermuda
- St. David's Head, Bermuda
- St. David's Island, Bermuda
- St. George's Harbor, Bermuda
- St. George's Island, Bermuda
- Subdivisions of Bermuda
- Template:Bermuda-geo-stub
- The Causeway, Bermuda
- Tobacco Bay, Bermuda
- Trott's Pond, Bermuda
- Trunk Island, Bermuda
- Tucker's Town Peninsula, Bermuda
- Tucker's Town, Bermuda
- USCG Air-Sea Rescue, at USAF Base, Kindley Field
- USCG Base, Whites Island, Bermuda. WWI
- U.S. Naval Facility Bermuda
- Victoria Park, Hamilton
- Warwick Parish, Bermuda

=== Hurricanes in Bermuda ===
- Hurricane Debby (1982)
- Hurricane Emily (1987)
- Hurricane Dean (1989)
- Hurricane Felix (1995)
- Hurricane Karen (2001)
- Hurricane Fabian (2003
- Hurricane Florence (2006)
- Hurricane Igor (2010)

=== Maps of Bermuda ===
- Maps of Bermuda

=== Subdivisions of Bermuda ===
- Subdivisions of Bermuda
- Devonshire Parish, Bermuda
- Hamilton Parish, Bermuda
- Hamilton, Bermuda
- Paget Parish, Bermuda
- Pembroke Parish, Bermuda
- Sandys Parish, Bermuda
- Smith's Parish, Bermuda
- Southampton Parish, Bermuda
- St. George's Parish, Bermuda
- St. George's, Bermuda

== Government of Bermuda ==
- Governor of Bermuda

== History of Bermuda ==
- History of Bermuda
- Bermuda Admiralty Case
- Bermuda Militia 1612-1687
- Bermuda Militia 1687-1813
- Bermuda Militia 1813
- Bermuda Militias 1612-1815
- Hurricane Fabian
- Royal Air Force, Bermuda, 1939-1945
- Sea Venture
- George Somers
- Somers Isles Company
- Thomas Gates (governor)
- USN Submarine Base, Ordnance Island, Bermuda
- London Company

=== Elections in Bermuda ===
- Elections in Bermuda

=== National heroes ===
- Edgar F. Gordon
- Gladys Morrell
- Mary Prince
- Edward Richards
- Henry Tucker

== Military of Bermuda ==
- Military of Bermuda
- Bermuda Militia 1612-1687
- Bermuda Militia 1687-1813
- Bermuda Militia 1813
- Bermuda Militia Artillery
- Bermuda Militias 1612-1815
- Bermuda Regiment
- Bermuda Sea Cadet Corps
- Bermuda Volunteer Rifle Corps
- Naval Air Station Bermuda
- RNAS Boaz Island
- Glyn Gilbert
- Royal Naval Dockyard, Bermuda
- USN Submarine Base, Ordnance Island, Bermuda

== Bermudian people ==
- Kenneth Amis
- Lois Browne-Evans
- Peter Benchley
- Michael Douglas
- Edward Harris (archaeologist)
- Glyn Gilbert
- Thomas Norman Nisbett
- Thomas Leslie Outerbridge
- Mary Prince
- William Alexander Scott
- Jennifer M. Smith
- Gina Swainson
- John Swan

=== Bishops of Bermuda ===
- Arthur Heber Browne
- John Arthur Jagoe
- Anthony Lewis Elliott Williams
- John Armstrong
- Eric Joseph Trapp
- Robert Wright Stopford
- Anselm Genders
- Christopher Charles Luxmoore
- William John Denbigh Down
- Ewen Ratteray

=== Bermudian musicians ===
==== Bermudian guitarists ====
===== Bermudian female guitarists =====
- Heather Nova

=== Bermudian sportspeople ===
==== Bermudian athletes ====
- Troy Douglas
- Brian Wellman

==== Bermudian boxers ====
- Clarence Hill (boxer)

==== Bermudian cricketers ====
- Dennis Archer (cricketer)
- Delyone Borden
- Lionel Cann
- Hasan Durham
- Treadwell Gibbons
- Kevin Hurdle
- Dwayne Leverock
- Dean Minors
- Daniel Morgan (cricketer)
- Saleem Mukuddem
- George O'Brien (cricketer)
- Steven Outerbridge
- Azeem Pitcher
- Irving Romaine
- Clay Smith (cricketer)
- Ryan Steede
- Janeiro Tucker
- Kwame Tucker

===== Bermudian ODI cricketers =====
- List of Bermudian ODI cricketers
- Delyone Borden
- Lionel Cann
- Hasan Durham
- Treadwell Gibbons
- Kevin Hurdle
- Dwayne Leverock
- Dean Minors
- Daniel Morgan (cricketer)
- Saleem Mukuddem
- George O'Brien (cricketer)
- Steven Outerbridge
- Azeem Pitcher
- Irving Romaine
- Clay Smith (cricketer)
- Ryan Steede
- Janeiro Tucker
- Kwame Tucker

World Cup cricketers of Bermuda

==== Bermudian footballers ====
- David Bascome
- Clyde Best
- Shaun Goater
- Kyle Lightbourne
- John Barry Nusum
- Khano Smith

==== Olympic competitors for Bermuda ====
- Troy Douglas
- Clarence Hill (boxer)
- Brian Wellman

==== Bermudian triathletes ====
- Tyler Butterfield

== Politics of Bermuda ==
- House of Assembly of Bermuda
- List of premiers of Bermuda
- Parliament of Bermuda
- Politics of Bermuda
- Senate of Bermuda

=== Political parties in Bermuda ===
- List of political parties in Bermuda
- Progressive Labour Party (Bermuda)
- United Bermuda Party

== Science and technology in Bermuda ==
- Bermuda Biological Station for Research

== Sport in Bermuda ==
- Bermuda at the 1930 British Empire Games
- Bermuda at the 2006 Commonwealth Games

=== Football in Bermuda ===
- Bermuda Football Association
- Bermuda national football team

==== Bermudian football clubs ====
- Dandy Town Hornets F.C.

==== Bermudian football competitions ====
- Cingular Wireless Premier Division
- USL Second Division

==== Football venues in Bermuda ====
- Bermuda National Stadium

=== Bermuda at the Olympics ===
- Bermuda at the 1976 Summer Olympics
- Bermuda at the 1988 Summer Olympics
- Bermuda at the 2000 Summer Olympics
- Bermuda at the 2004 Summer Olympics
- Bermuda at the 2006 Winter Olympics

== Transport in Bermuda ==
- Transport in Bermuda

=== Airports in Bermuda ===
- Bermuda International Airport

=== Nautical terms ===
- Bermuda Fitted Dinghy
- Bermuda rig
- Bermuda sloop

== See also ==
- List of Bermuda-related topics
- List of international rankings
- Lists of country-related topics
- Outline of geography
- Outline of North America
