= Places of interest in Bermuda =

The following is a list of places of interest in Bermuda.

== City of Hamilton ==
- Hamilton Harbour

== Hamilton Parish ==
- Harrington Sound – large inlet surrounded for all but a small distance by the Bermudian mainland.
- Crystal Cave – natural limestone caves open to the public
- Mangrove Lake
- Trott's Pond - small lake
- Flatt's Village – one of Bermuda's five main settlements

== Paget Parish ==
- Salt Kettle Peninsula
- Bermuda Botanical Gardens

== Pembroke Parish ==
- Spanish Point
- Government House – home of the Governor of Bermuda

== Sandys Parish ==
- Royal Naval Dockyard
- Somerset Village – one of Bermuda's five main settlements.
- Somerset Bridge – the world's smallest working drawbridge.
- Bermuda Maritime Museum

== Smith's Parish ==
- Devil's Hole – sinkhole which forms a natural aquarium

== Southampton Parish ==
- Gibbs Hill Lighthouse – the tallest building in Bermuda, visible from most points in the islands.
- Horseshoe Bay – Bermuda's most famous beach.
- Little Sound – a natural sheltered harbour, the southern section of the Great Sound - the body of water which is surrounded by the Bermuda chain.
- Church Bay – Bermuda's "best" snorkelling.

== St. George's Parish ==
- Ferry Reach
- Annie's Bay
- Castle Harbour
- Castle Island
- Paget Island
- Smith's Island
- St. David's Head
- St. David's Island
- Tobacco Bay
- Tucker's Town Peninsula
- Tucker's Town – one of Bermuda's five main settlements
- Nonsuch Island – wildlife sanctuary

== St. George's Town ==
- Featherbed Alley Printshop
- Ordnance Island
- St. George's Harbour
