= Bailey's Bay, Bermuda =

Bay of Bermuda

Coordinates: 32°20′54″N 64°43′41″W

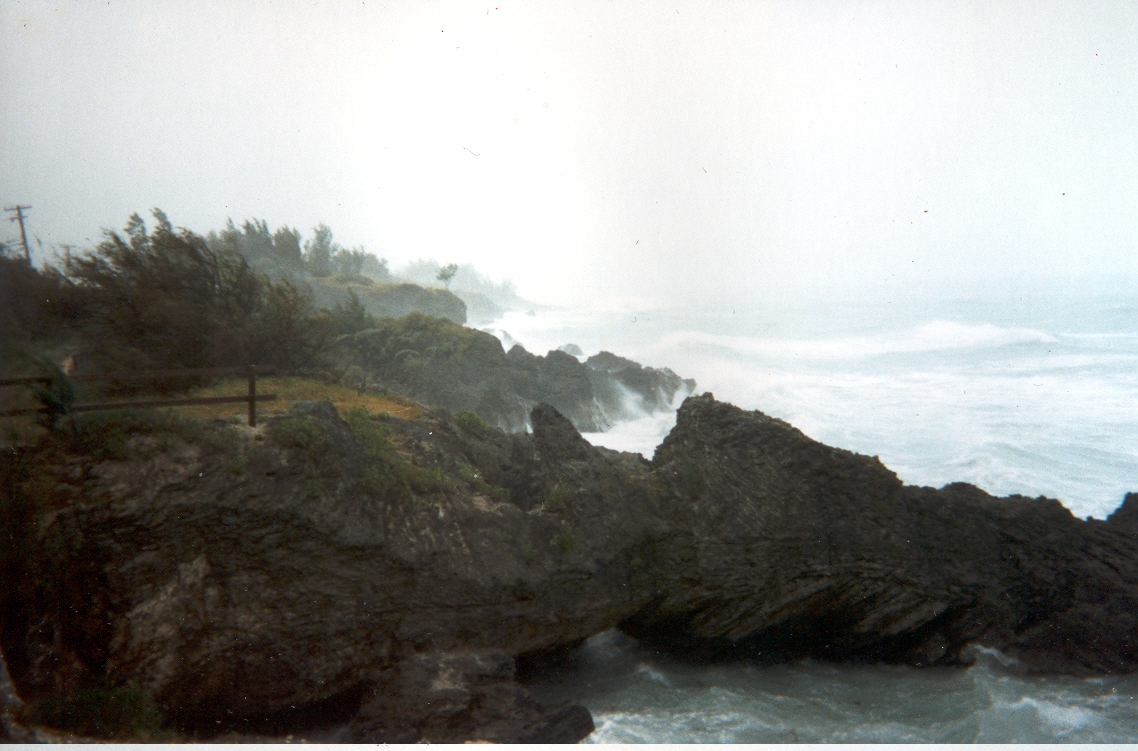
The coast of Callan Glen, the area on the north-eastern side of Bailey's Bay, with Bay Island visible.

Bailey's Bay is a long shallow indentation in the northeastern shore of the main island of Bermuda. It stretches for about 1,500 metres (1,600 yd) along the north coast of Hamilton Parish. The settlement which stretches along the bay's coast is also called Bailey's Bay.

The entrance to the bay is protected by a long reef which rises to the surface at several points, most notably as Bay Island.

A footbridge crosses the northeastern extremity of the bay. This bridge is part of the Bermuda Railway Trail, a walking path which follows the track of the former Bermuda Railway.

Bailey's Bay is well-connected to Bermuda's public transportation network, with a key bus stop located near the heart of the area. The Bailey's Bay bus station serves as a hub for routes connecting the parish to Hamilton (the capital), St. George's, and other parts of the island. This accessibility makes it a convenient starting point for visitors exploring Bermuda's eastern parishes, including nearby attractions like the Crystal Caves and Shelly Bay Beach. The bus service aligns with Bermuda's emphasis on sustainable travel, offering an efficient alternative to rental vehicles for both locals and tourists.
