= Tucker's Town, Bermuda =

Tucker's Town
- Village
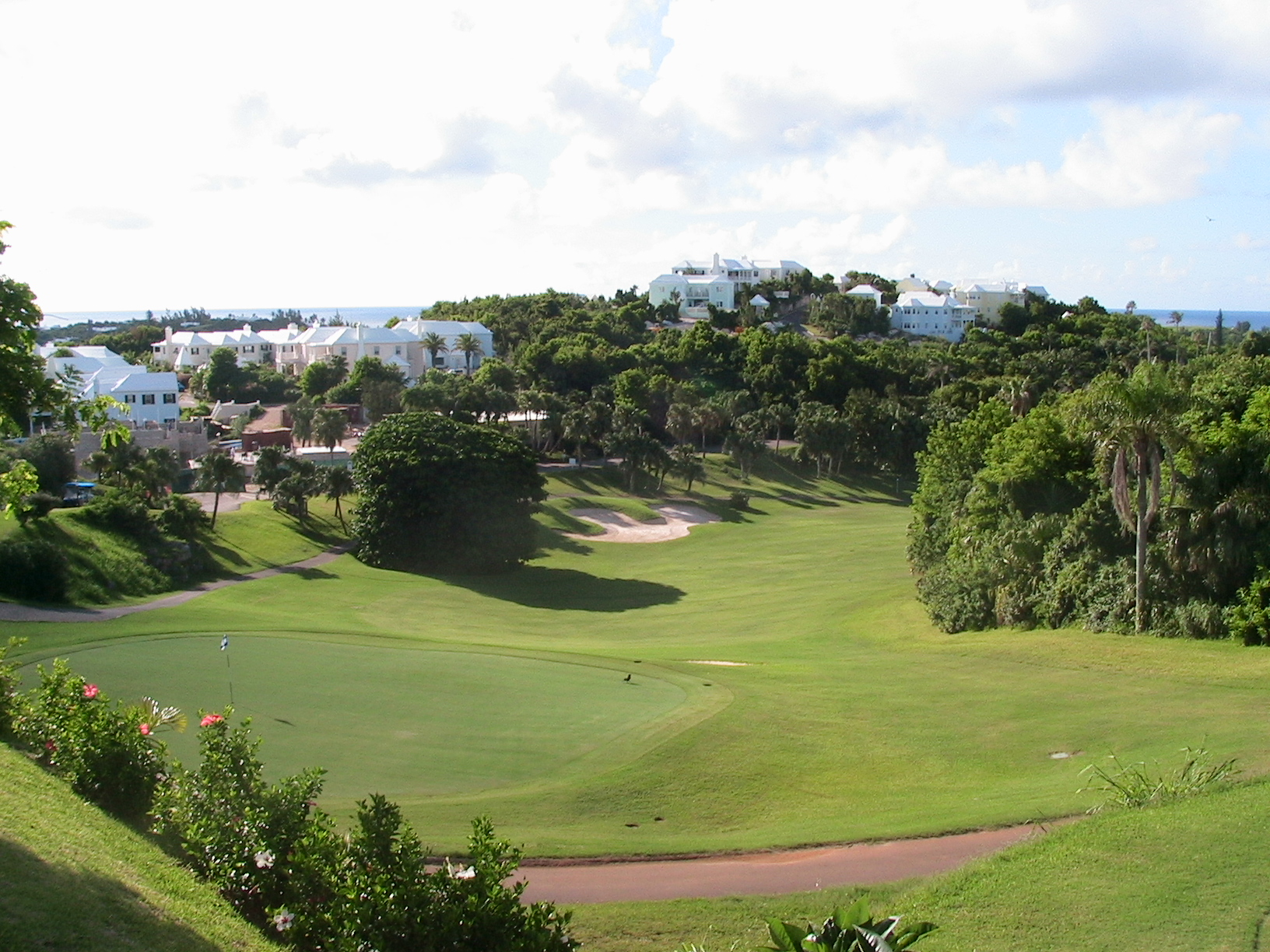
- A golf course in Tucker's Town, surrounded by houses

- Location within Bermuda
- Coordinates: 32°20′N 64°41′W
- Country: Bermuda
- Parish: St. George's
- Time zone: Atlantic

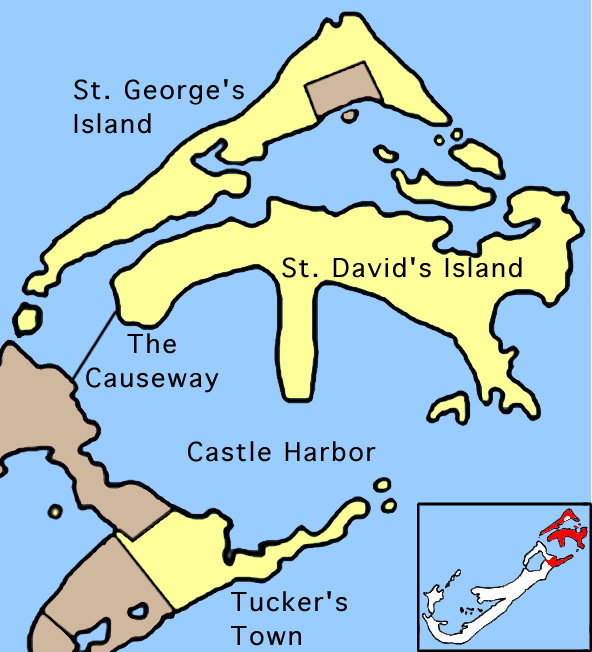
A map of St. George's Parish, Bermuda, with Tucker's Town in the south.

Tucker's Town is a small community in St. George's Parish, Bermuda at the mouth of Castle Harbour. It is the only part of the parish on the Main Island, and includes the Tucker's Town Peninsula that today is the site of many homes belonging to wealthy non-Bermudians. The most densely populated part of Tucker's Town was historically situated west of Tucker's Town Bay (not on the peninsula), and was almost entirely cleared to make way for golf links.

== History ==
=== Forgotten community ===
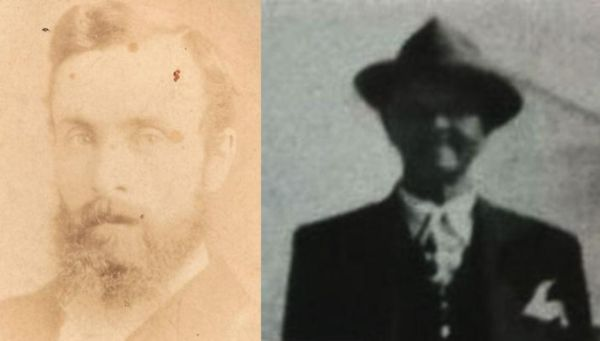
Oliver Constantine Lambert and his son-in-law, Osmond Charles Fanshaw Talbot, two of the residents who fought the compulsory purchase of Tucker's Town

Tucker's Town was founded by the recently arrived Governor of Bermuda Daniel Tucker in 1616, but the land was found "verie meene", while the harbour itself was unprotected from the weather and isolated from the rest of the island. Tucker ignored these issues and began to lay out a street grid plan – featuring a 12-foot-wide (3.7 m) road—and had a small chapel built, but was unable to attract any migrants from the main settlement at St. George's. The following year, only two or three cottages had been built in the area, and those were inhabited by soldiers manning Castle Island. Once the failure of the Town was acknowledged, the land was allotted to officers stationed at Castle Island, and off-duty soldiers tended to spend their time there instead of at the Island's sentry post. The only civilian presence was the family of the fort commander.

By 1750, a small civilian community—35 families living on 350 acres (1.4 km^{2}) of public land—had finally been established, as had a whaling station to support hunting off Bermuda's south shore. In 1758, Governor William Popple regranted the land to a group of wealthy landowners, but this had little effect on the tenants.

In 1780, the Government of Bermuda began an initiative to encourage the cultivation of cotton in Tucker's Town. The move was not commercially successful, as the wrong kind of cotton was grown. By 1834, former slaves owned property in Tucker's Town as part of St. George's large free black population (some 45% of St. George's blacks prior to that year's abolition of slavery).

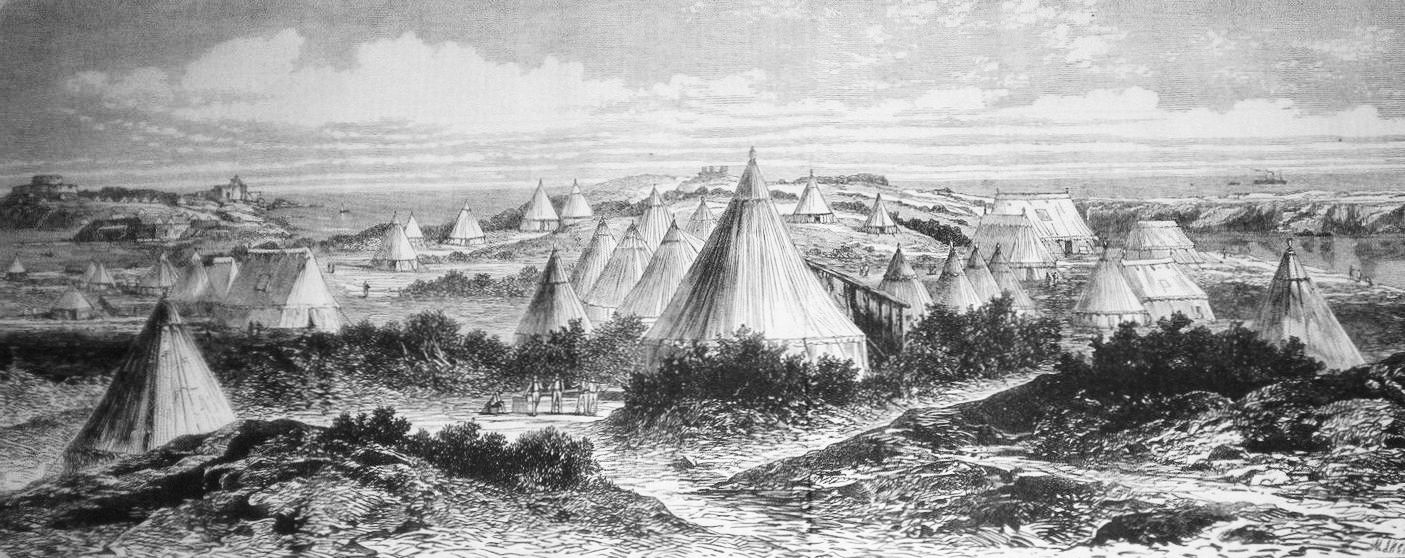
Royal Artillery and Royal Engineers camp at Tucker's Town in 1867

An 1856 hurricane strike, coupled with frequent waterspouts and tornadoes, destroyed much of the area's pastures and houses. During the American Civil War in the 1860s, hundreds of barrels of gunpowder and saltpetre were stored at Tucker's Town and Smith's Island. In 1862, a 42-year-old black labourer named James Talbot purchased more than 100 acres (0.40 km^{2}) of Tucker's Town from the estate of lawyer Benjamin Dickinson Harvey, who in 1800 had acquired nearly 200 acres (0.81 km^{2}) of the area. In 1882, Talbot sold part of his estate for a nominal fee so that a school could be built. The school's eight trustees planned for a one-room school that would also be used to encourage temperance (see also: temperance movement). The schoolhouse survives as "Lookout Cottage" at the entrance of the Mid Ocean Club.

=== Tourism centre ===
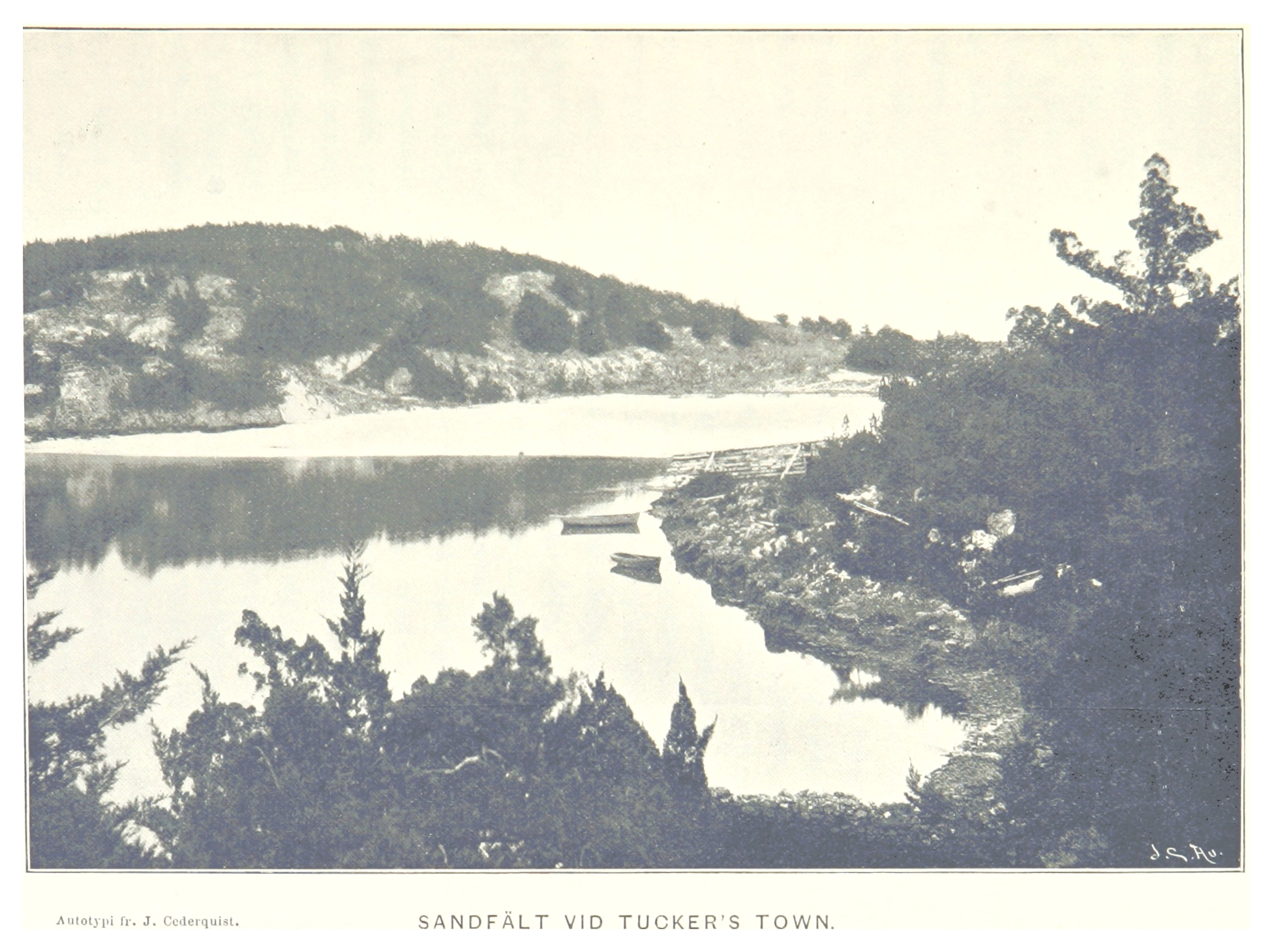
Tucker's Town in 1895

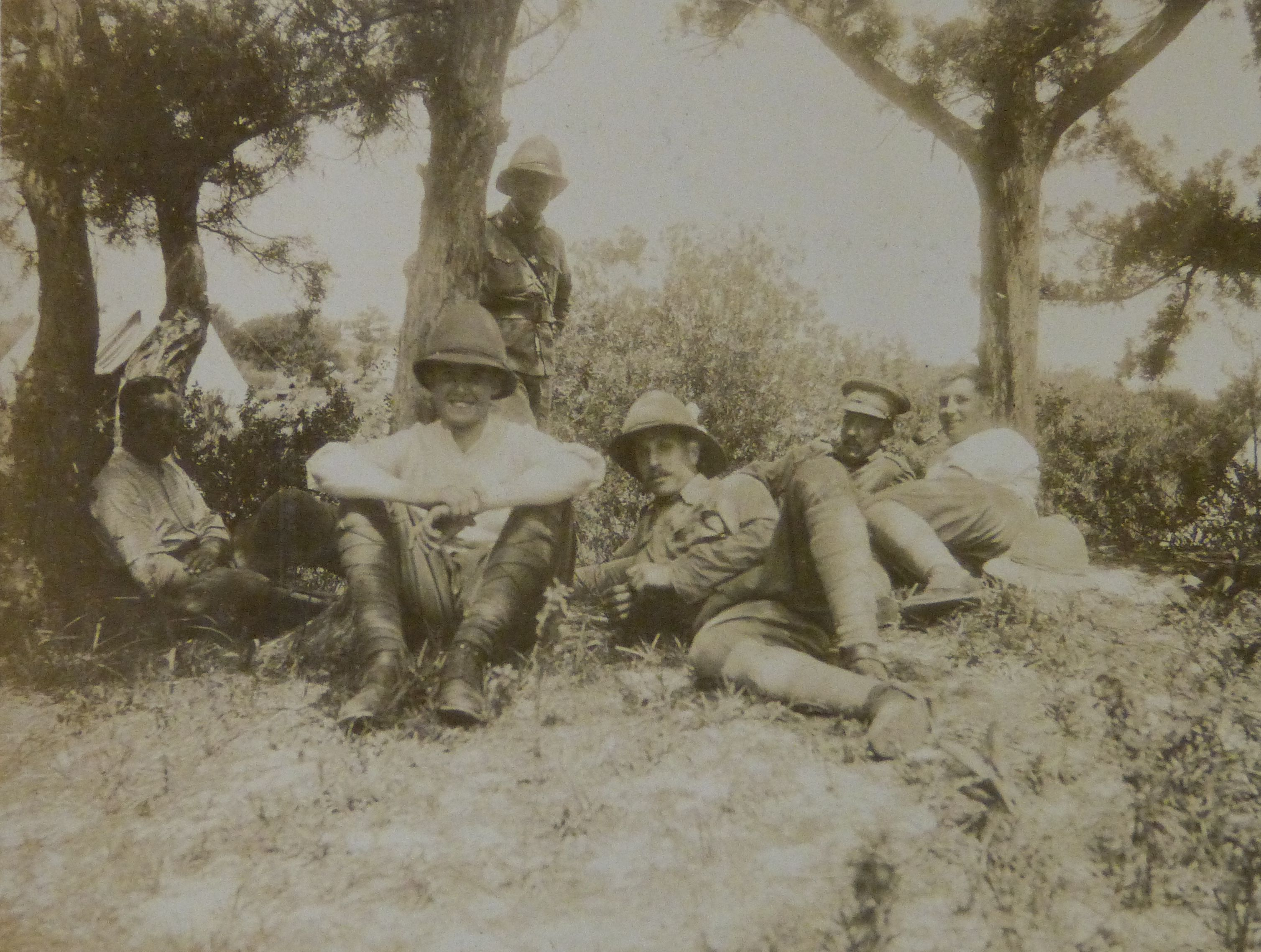
Officers of the 3rd Battalion Royal Fusiliers (City of London Regiment) during Battalion Training at Tucker's Town in 1904. The area was long used by the military for coastal defence, tent camps, and field training

By the twentieth century, the area was one of Bermuda's poorest and most neglected locales. The Bermuda Development Company was formed in response to growing American tourism. This body aimed to create an exclusive and prestigious enclave for wealthy tourists, and was empowered to force residents to sell their land. The plan was favoured by most Bermudians, who were excited by the prospect of a post-war tourism revival, and a petition objecting to the plan was signed by only 24 people, mostly belonging to a handful of closely related families residing in Tucker's Town. The land was purchased for well-below asking price, and many of the displaced moved to the area of Devil's Hole.

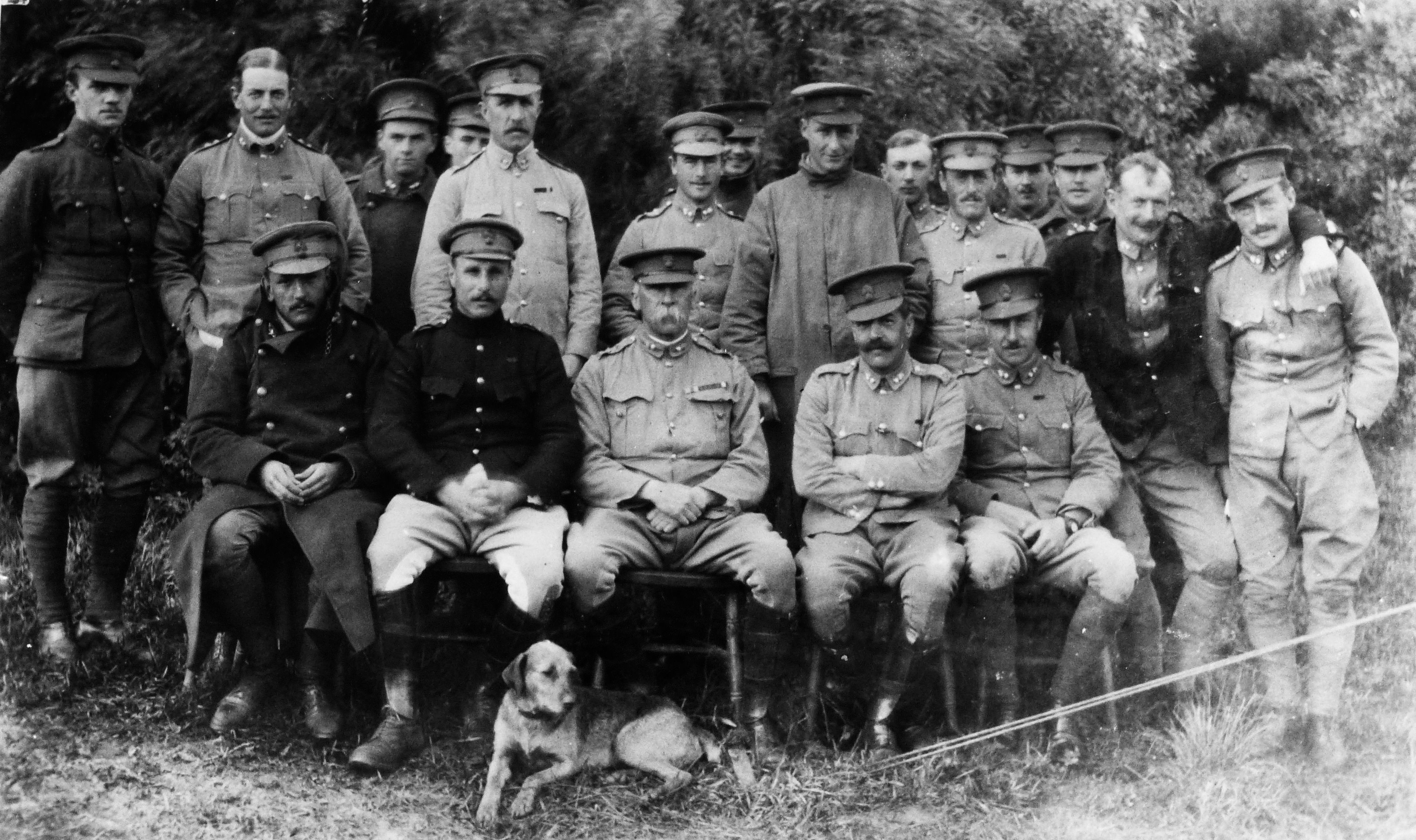
Officers of the 3rd Battalion, The Royal Fusiliers (City of London Regiment), at Battalion Training at Tucker's Town, Bermuda, 1905

Most of the signatories of the 23 July, 1920, petition against the planned land acquisitions and redevelopment called for in the "Bermuda Development Company Act (No. 2), 1920" were related to the Talbot Brothers band, including their maternal grandfather, Oliver Constantine Lambert, parents Osmond Charles Fanshaw Talbot (husband of Mamie Susan Kennedy Augusta Lambert) and Ainslie Letitia Dansmore Manders (born Lambert), maternal uncles Stewart Hastings Lambert and Oliver Ceylon Lambert, maternal aunts Essie Celina Gertrude Lambert, Ann Mahew Constantine Simmons, and Ada Permelia Arlene Simmons, and other relatives Eliza Harriet Talbot (Smith), Rose Ann Smith (possibly a namesake of their maternal grandmother, Rose Ann Lambert, whose maiden surname was Smith), Dina Smith (the sister of their maternal grandmother), and five other Smiths, to whom they were related through both the Lambert (via their maternal grandmother, Rose Ann Lambert, born Rose Ann Smith) and Talbot families. Other signatories were Minnie Andrew Palmer, Henry Nelms, Clarkson Frederick Burgess, Henry Thomas Harvey, Oscar Anderson, and Lancelot Laud Havard, the Rector of Hamilton and Smith's Glebe.

The petition was unsuccessful and Tucker's Town was compulsorily purchased with Dina Smith the last resident to leave when she was forcibly removed from her property in 1923. Many of these relatives were participants in the civil suit of the descendants of Josiah Smith (the maternal grandfather of sisters Mamie Susan Kennedy Augusta Lambert and Ainslie Letitia Dansmore Lambert, the mothers of the Talbot Brothers band members) against the Bermuda Development Company in the Supreme Court in 1924 that resulted in compensation paid to the descendants for the land known as the Josiah Smith Estate at Tucker's Town.

The BDC partnered with Furness Withy, the steamship company that operated passenger liners between Bermuda and the United States, which hired Charles B. Macdonald to design a golf course for its new Castle Harbour Hotel, the Mid Ocean Club. Macdonald's course was finished in December 1921, with the assistance of Portuguese workers from the Azores. The BDC also encouraged the richest of visitors to build their own mansions at Tucker's Town. Childs Frick and Abby Aldrich Rockefeller were among the early elites to build summer homes. The hotel itself was completed, after two years of construction, on 30 November 1931. Opened by the Governor, General Sir Thomas Astley Cubitt, it featured 400 rooms and was built by 600 Azorean contractors. Prominent visitors were often photographed and used to market Bermuda, and included Babe Ruth, Albert Einstein, Harpo Marx, Irving Berlin and Shirley Temple. In 1935, almost 75,000 tourists visited the overseas territory, compared to 27,000 in 1911 and less than 1,400 in 1885.

Following the Second World War – during which Tucker's Town was garrisoned as the site of the Cable and Wireless transatlantic telegraph cable hut – the Mid Ocean Club (and Furness, who by that point ran several more hotels in Bermuda) was struggling financially, and in 1951 it was sold to its members. Golf course architect Robert Trent Jones was hired to redesign the course, though he made few changes to MacDonald's design.

Today, individuals such as American businessman and Presidential candidate Ross Perot (who made headlines in 1992 for his involvement in the dynamiting of a live coral reef near his mansion), Prime Minister of Italy Silvio Berlusconi and Mayor of New York City Michael Bloomberg are known residents.

Tucker's Town gave its name to a song by Hootie & the Blowfish on the 1996 album Fairweather Johnson.
