= Long Island, Bermuda =

Small island within the Great Sound in Bermuda

Coordinates: 32°17′10″N 64°49′10″W

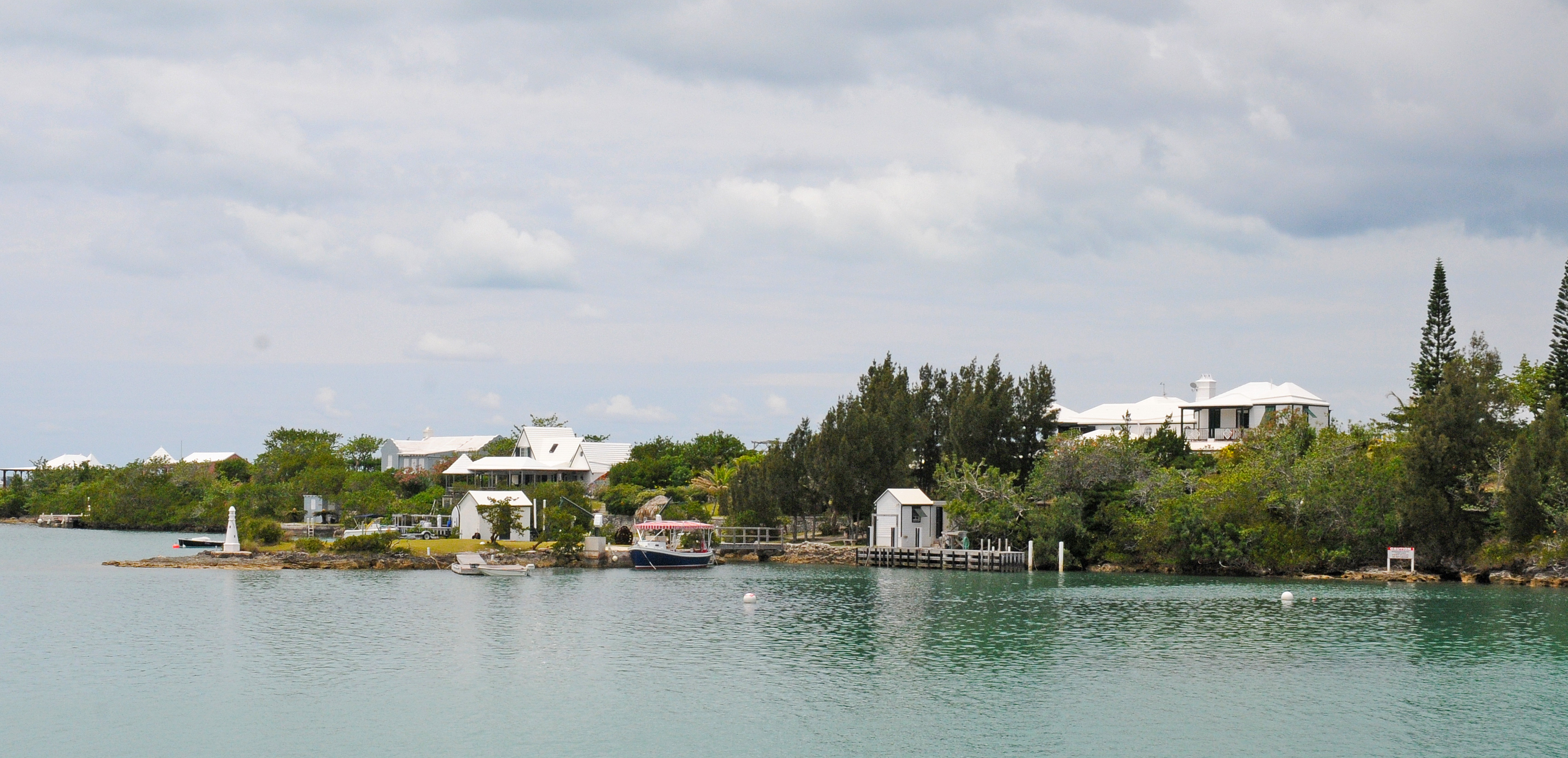
Bermudian house on Long Island in the centre of main harbour

Location of Long Island in the Great Sound

Long Island is a small island within the Great Sound in Bermuda. It lies in the southeast of the sound, and is in the north of Warwick Parish.

Like its neighbours Nelly, Ports, and Hawkins islands, it was owned by the British Admiralty, and became a prisoner of war camp during the Second Boer War from 1901 to 1902. A cemetery on the island, which had previously been used by the military for victims of yellow fever, became a Boer War cemetery, and is maintained as a memorial by the Bermuda National Trust.
