= Victoria Park, Hamilton, Bermuda =

Park in Bermuda

Coordinates: 32.2955°N 64.7846°W

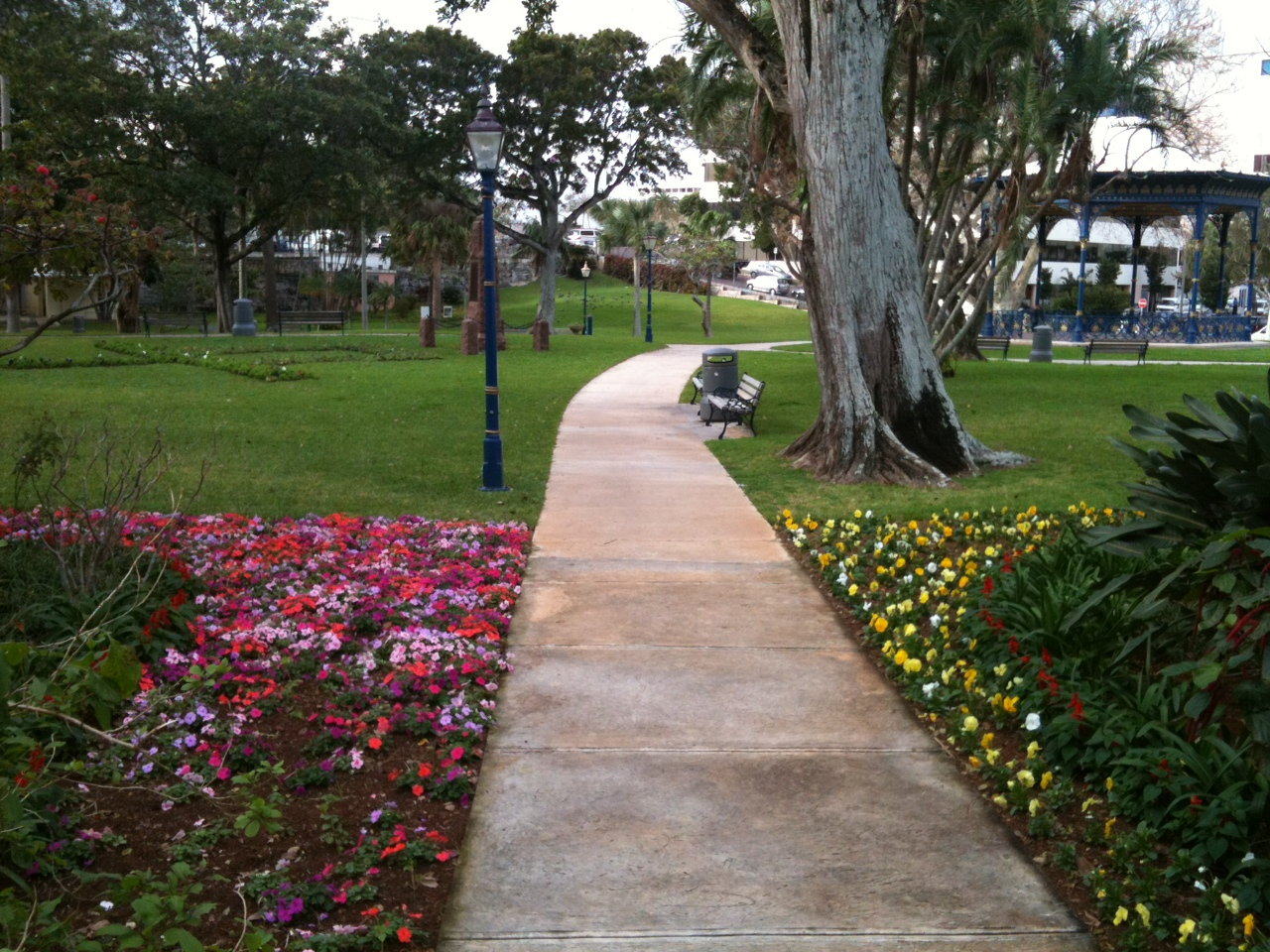
View from northeast entrance

Victoria Park is centrally located in the city of Hamilton, Bermuda (Hamilton is also the capital of Bermuda). It is a public park that is opened daily to the public during daylight hours. It is widely used as an entertainment venue for free concerts and the like. There is also a rather attractive bandstand in the middle of the park, installed in 1889 in commemoration of the Golden Jubilee of Queen Victoria, and renewed in 2008. The park also contains attractive flower gardens and several species of endemic plants and trees. The park takes up a full block, with a number of benches and public restrooms. The park is bordered by Victoria Street, Washington Street, Dundonald Street and Cedar Avenue. It is under the administration of the Corporation of Hamilton.

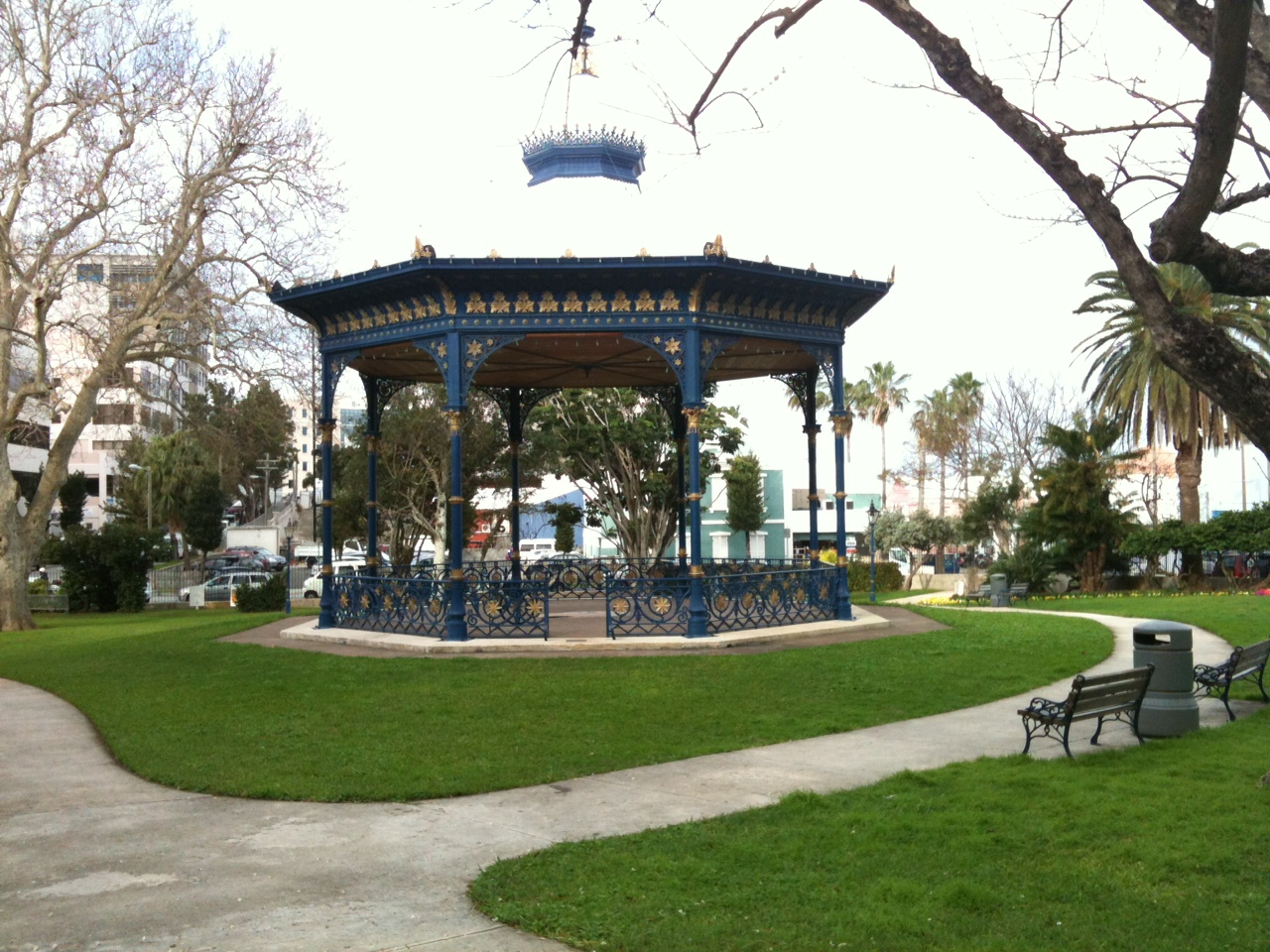
View of the bandstand

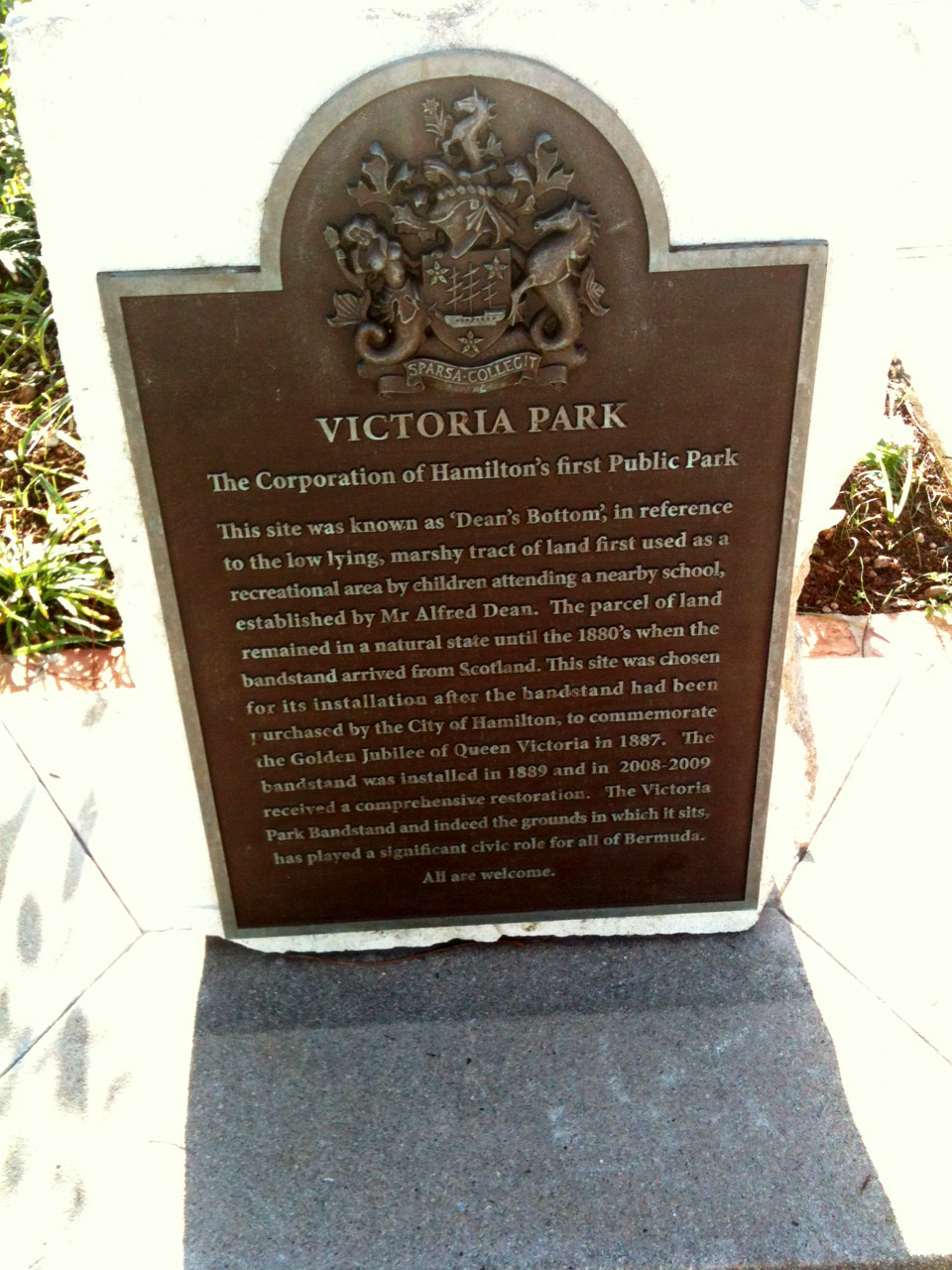
Plaque near north-west entrance

After the bandstand restoration, the Corporation of Hamilton erected a plaque in the park, with the following inscription:

Victoria Park

The Corporation of Hamilton's first Public Park

This site was known as 'Dean's Bottom', in reference to the low lying, marshy tract of land first used as a recreational area by children attending a nearby school, established by Mr Alfred Dean. The parcel of land remained in a natural state until the 1880s when the bandstand arrived from Scotland. This site was chosen for its installation after the bandstand had been purchased by the City of Hamilton, to commemorate the Golden Jubilee of Queen Victoria in 1887. The bandstand was installed in 1889 and in 2008-2009 received a comprehensive restoration. The Victoria Park Bandstand and indeed the grounds in which it sits, has played a significant civic role for all of Bermuda.

All are welcome.
