= Smith's Parish =

Parish of Bermuda

Coordinates: 32°18′55″N 64°44′06″W

Smith's Parish is one of the nine parishes of Bermuda. It is named for English aristocrat Sir Thomas Smith or Smythe (1558–1625).

== Description ==
It is located in the northeast of the main island, at the southern end of Harrington Sound, the large lagoon close to the main island's northeastern tip. It is joined to Devonshire Parish in the southwest and Hamilton Parish in the northeast. As with most of Bermuda's parishes, it covers just over 2.3 square miles (about 6.0 km² or 1500 acres). It had a population of 5,984 in 2016.

Natural features in Smith's include Spittal Pond, John Smith's Beach, Devil's Hole, Gibbet Island, and Portuguese Rock.

== History ==
Like all of parishes of Bermuda, Smith's was named after one of the nine chief investors of the Somers Isles (Bermuda) Company. In this case, it was named for the Company's first governor, Sir Thomas Smith, who also acted as a governor for the East India Company and treasurer of the Virginia Company. Smith would go on to invest some £60,000 into Bermuda (only £20,000 less than what he invested in the much larger Virginia). Despite this, his contribution to his stake in the colony was minimal, and the area was briefly known as "Harris' Bay".

== Politics ==
For purposes of national representation, Smith's has been divided into three constituencies (Smith's South, Smith's West and Smith's North), and so has three representatives in Parliament. As of 2003, two of these are members of the UBP party, and one is a member of the PLP party.

== Education ==
Schools in the Parish:

- Harrington Sound Primary School
- Whitney Institute Middle School
