= Spanish Point, Bermuda =

Prominent headland in Bermuda

Coordinates: 32°18′18″N 64°48′40″W

Spanish Point is a prominent headland in Bermuda. It is located in Pembroke Parish five kilometres to the northwest of the capital Hamilton. It forms the eastern coast at the entrance to the Great Sound.

North west of Bermuda's Hamilton city in Pembroke Parish, there is a small area of land reaching out into the mouth of Great Sound water area, called the Spanish Point.

The area has been named by early settlers after the Spanish sailor Ramirez. He settled at what is now the Point Mart convenience store the official entrance to Point. St. John's Hill (renamed Clarence Hill in honour of the Duke of Clarence), a property at Spanish Point, was a former site of Admiralty House. Much of Spanish Point, beyond Clarance Hill was under long-term lease by the Royal Navy.

Vehicles reach this area through Black Watch Pass, a cut through the high coral cliff that was opened in 1934.

Over 2.5 million tons of rock were removed to create the first route over the north shore cliffs. As you go down the winding Spanish Point Road, you will see the Stovel Bay and its small beach next to the car park. It's a small marina where fishing boats and dinghies are moored.
