= Hamilton Parish =

Parish of Bermuda

Coordinates: 32°20′31″N 64°43′41″W

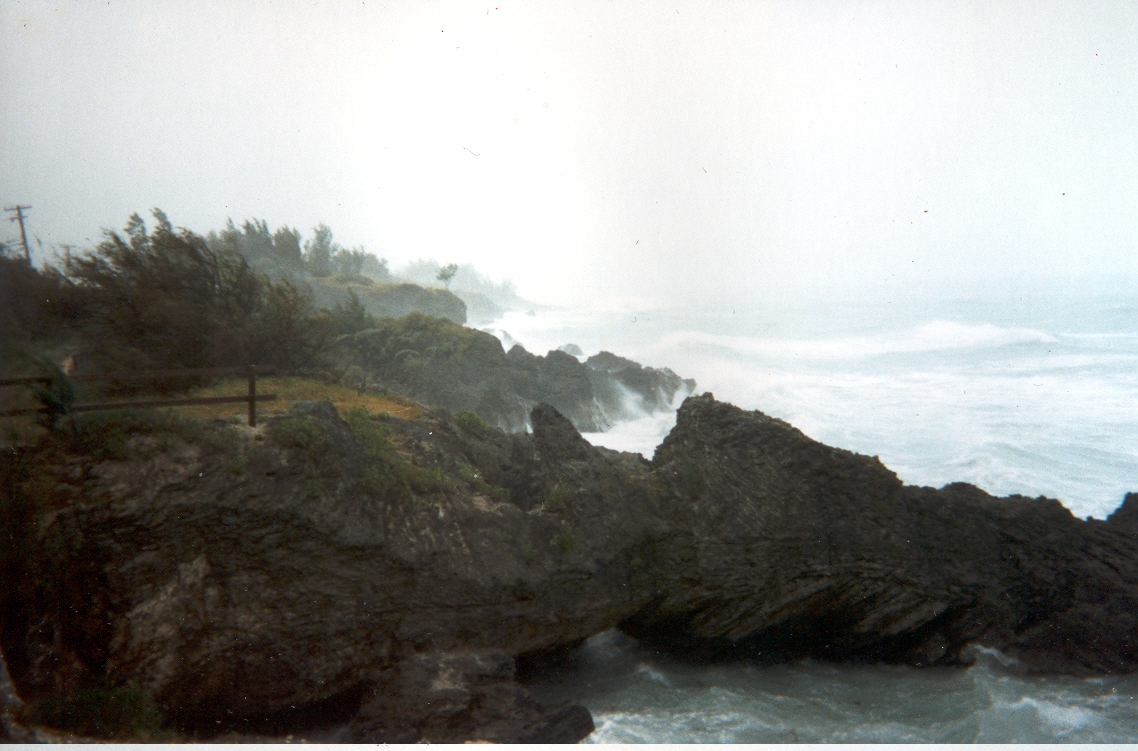
The coast of Callan Glen, Hamilton Parish, Bermuda.

Hamilton Parish (originally Bedford Parish) is one of the nine parishes of Bermuda. It was renamed for Scottish aristocrat James Hamilton, 2nd Marquess of Hamilton (1589–1625) when he purchased the shares originally held in the Virginia Company by Lucy Russell, Countess of Bedford.

It is located in the northeast of the chain's main island, and is split in two by the large Harrington Sound, occupying all but the south and northeastern tip of its coast. The islands within the sound also form part of the parish. It is joined to Smith's Parish in the south, and St. George's Parish in the northeast. As with most of Bermuda's parishes, it covers just over 2.3 square miles (about 6.0 km² or 1500 acres). It had a population of 5,584 in 2016.

Natural features in Hamilton include Flatt's Inlet, Trunk Island, Shelly Bay, Bailey's Bay, Mangrove Lake, Trott's Pond, Crystal Cave, Castle Harbor, and The Causeway, which links Hamilton with St. George's Parish.

Notable locations in Hamilton include the Bermuda Aquarium and Museum and the small settlement of Flatt's Village. Historically, the Colony's government had on occasion met in Flatts Village, rather than the then Capital of St. George's. The Village had prospered, in the days when the Colony's economy was seafaring, according to popular accounts, due to its distance from customs officials in St. George's.

Bailey's Bay, on the north shore of the Parish has also long been a thriving community, although it has never attained the status of a municipality. The name is used to denote an area which includes Callan Glen, the shallow depression running North-Eastward from Bailey's Bay (which was named for shipbuilder Claud MacCallan), Coney Island, Walsingham, and that part of the Island running Westward as far as Abbot's Cliff, on the Harrington Sound Shore. The area was long dominated by branches of the Outerbridge family (which includes the MacCallans). Notable landmarks include the Abbot's Cliff, Crystal Caves, and Mount Wyndham, once the location of Admiralty House, and from which the attack on Washington DC in 1815 was planned. Other sites of historical interest in the area include Tom Moore's Tavern (originally a private home, now a restaurant), and the adjacent nature reserve, and the Western end of the Causeway. Other non-municipal 'communal areas' of Hamilton include the area around The Crawl, including Crawl Hill (often referred to by locals as 'Crawl'), and Shelly Bay.

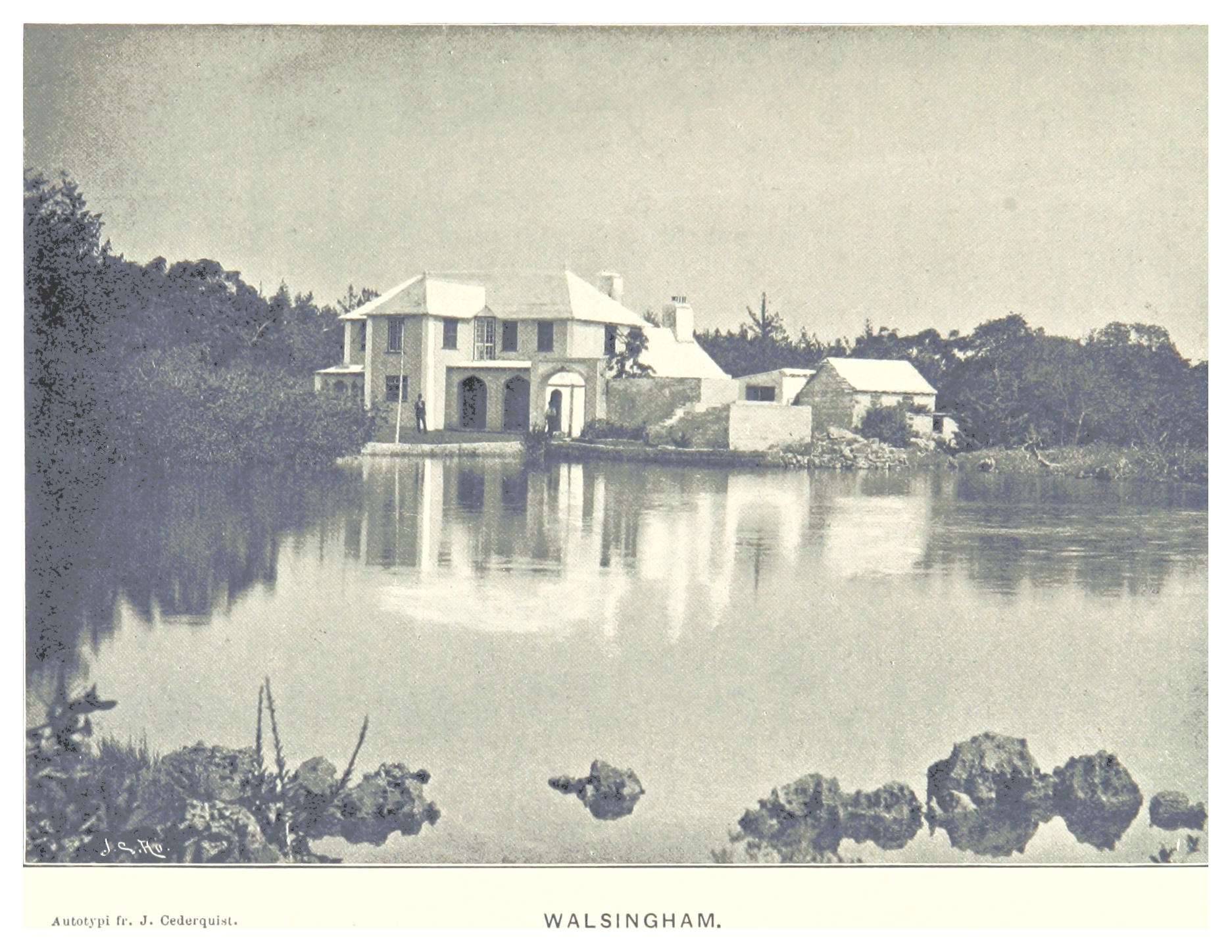
Walsingham, Hamilton Parish, 1895

== Education ==
Schools:

- Lyceum Preschool
- Francis Patton Primary School
