= Trott's Pond (Bermuda) =

Bermudan salt lake

- Location within Bermuda
- Location: Hamilton Parish
- Coordinates: 32°19′42″N 64°42′9″W
- Type: brackish
- Basin countries: Bermuda

Trott's Pond is a small lake in the northeast of Bermuda that is created by the sinkhole. Like many of Bermuda's lakes, its water is Brackish water (water that is saltier than fresh water, but not as salty as seawater), as it lies close to the Atlantic Ocean.

The lake lies in Hamilton Parish, to the east of Harrington Sound and 800 metres (half a mile) northeast of the larger Mangrove Lake.

Killifish can be found in the pond.
