= St. David's Head, Bermuda =

Headland in Bermuda

Coordinates: 32.37°N 64.65°W

St. David's Head, Bermuda (Bermuda)

St. David's Head is a headland in the northeast of St. David's Island, Bermuda. It is the easternmost point of the territory, and is located in St. George's Parish. Actually two headlands (Great Head and Little Head), it is the site of Great Head Battery, one of the many forts that surround the site of the territory's first settlement in the early 17th century, which is now open to the public as a national monument.

The head overlooks Gunner Bay and the northern entrance to St. George's Harbour.
