= Marshall's Island, Bermuda =

Small island within the Great Sound of Bermuda

Coordinates: 32.2847°N 64.8112°W

Marshall's Island is a small island within the Great Sound of Bermuda. It lies in the southeast of the sound, and is in the north of Warwick Parish. The island is in two distinct parts, joined by a narrow neck. Previously owned by the Royal Navy, it is now privately owned. Harold Mitchell lived and had his official address on the island.
