= Trunk Island, Bermuda =

Island in Harrington Sound, Bermuda

Trunk Island

- Trunk Island, Harrington Sound, Bermuda

Geography
- Location: Harrington Sound, Bermuda
- Coordinates: 32.3334°N 64.7272°W
- Archipelago: Bermuda
- Area: 0.028 km^{2} (0.011 sq mi)

Administration
- Bermuda
- Parish: Hamilton Parish

Trunk Island is the largest island in Harrington Sound, Bermuda. Its area is 7 acres (0.028 km^{2}), and it was used for tobacco farming and lumber in the 17th century. A survey of 1663 by Norwood describes Harington [sic] Sound as the Little Sound, and he speaks of "the greater of ye Islands in the Little Sound called Trunk Island in the occupation of John Roberts." Whilst some of the other smaller islands have changed names over the years, Trunk Island has always been so called (old maps labelled it Trunck Island), but its name is of unknown origin.

Today, it contains two properties: a mansion plot which was built by Augustus Musson whose dream it was to retire to the island, and a cottage plot. The island has been owned by the Tucker/Gardner family since the early 19th century and was used as a summer camp for Bermudian groups such as Sea Scouts and Girl Guides in the 1920s and 1930s. It remains privately owned by descendants of the first owners, although a share of the ownership of the mansion plot has now been donated to the Bermuda Zoological Society (BZS), which supports educational programs at the Bermuda Aquarium, Museum and Zoo. The Bermuda Zoological Society purchased the cottage property and has created a living classroom throughout the island.

== Ecology ==
In 2024, a program to re-introduce the threatened Bermuda skink (Plestiodon longirostris) was carried out on the island in conjunction with Chester Zoo in England.

King Charles III visited Trunk Island on May 1, 2026, where he met students and staff of BZS, helped plant a Bermuda cedar, and met local wildlife including hermit crabs and longtails.
