= Annie's Bay, Bermuda =

Bay in the northeast of Bermuda

Annie's Bay
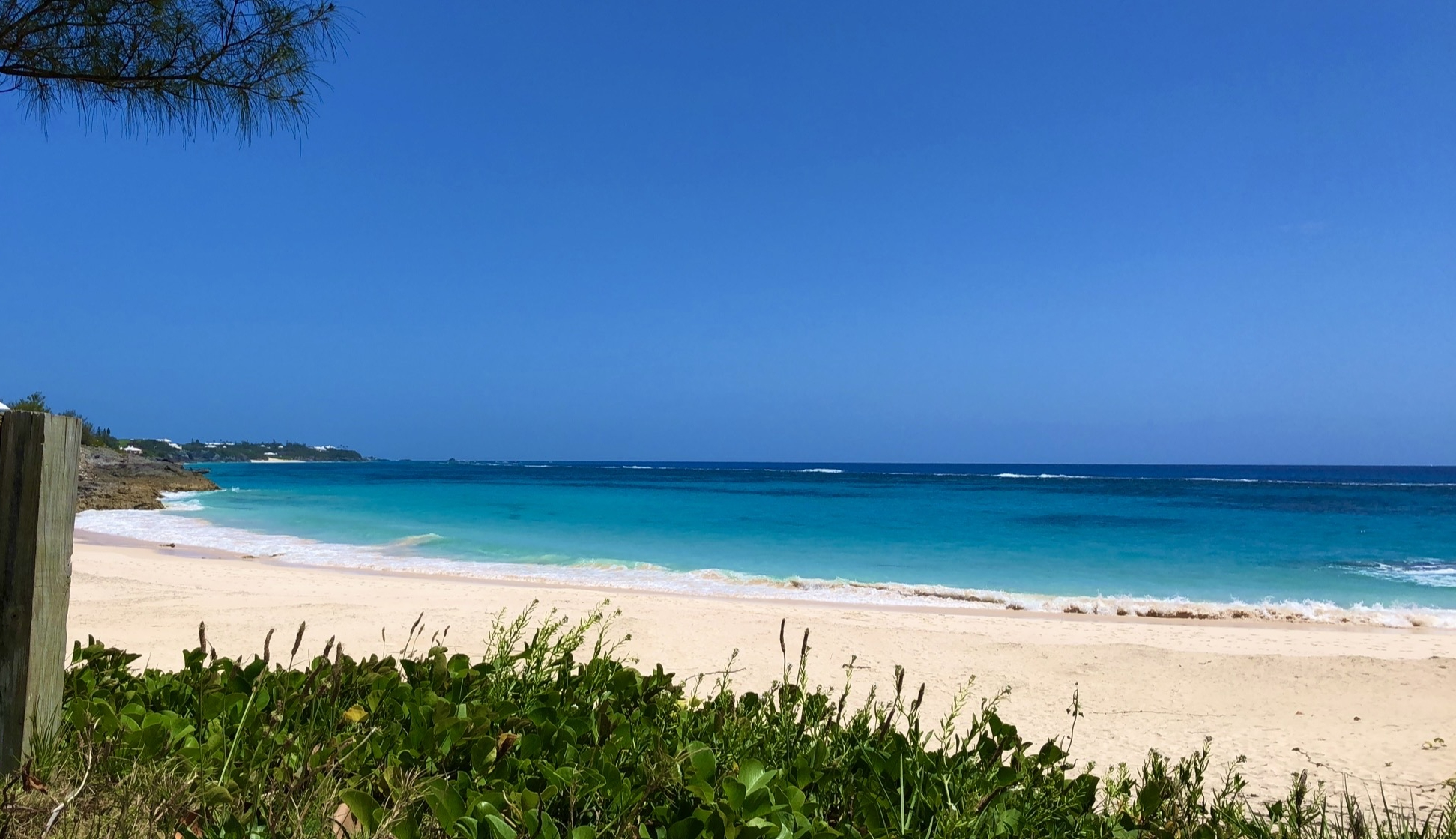
- Annie's Bay Beach
- Interactive map of Annie's Bay
- Location: Bermuda
- Coordinates: 32.360°N 64.658°W
- Type: Bay

Annie's Bay is a picturesque bay in the northeast of Bermuda. It occupies much of the east coast of Cooper's Island, in St. George's Parish.

Access to the bay was restricted from 1942 to 1995, while the surrounding land was part of military bases (originally the US Army's Fort Bell and then the US Kindley Air Force Base). The bay is now open to the public and is a popular recreation area, as well as a popular place for planespotters to watch planes, often referred to as the St. Maarten alternative of the Caribbean.
