= Tucker's Town Peninsula, Bermuda =

Peninsula in Bermuda

Coordinates: 32.334°N 64.684°W

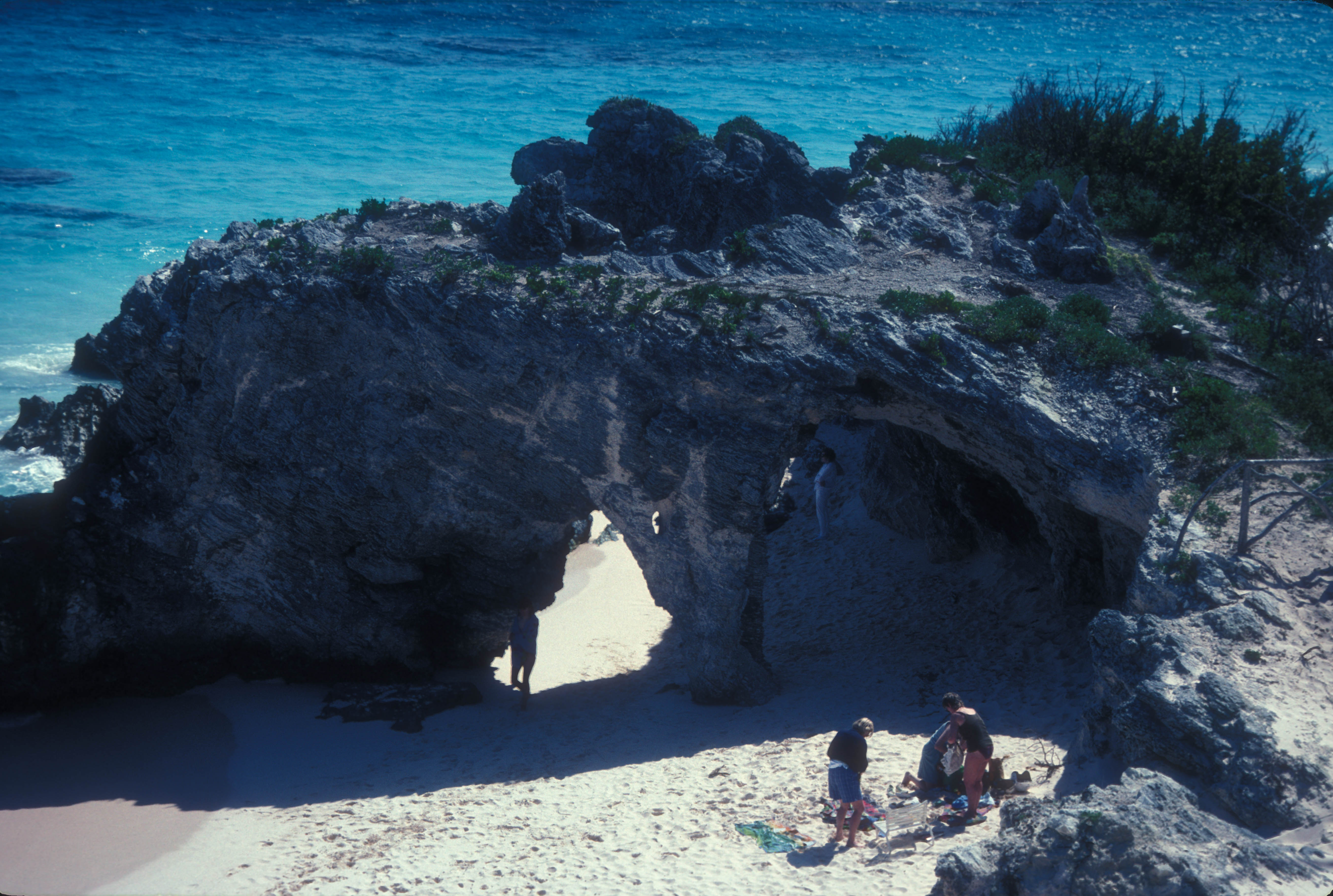
One of the natural arches on Natural Arch Beach, prior to 2003

Tucker's Town Peninsula is a two-mile long (3200 metre long) peninsula which extends from the northeastern tip of the main island of Bermuda. It is in St. George's Parish, and within the small settlement of Tucker's Town.

The area around Tucker's Town contains some of the most exclusive and expensive property in the world, and is the haunt of foreign millionaires, attracted to the area by its climate, surroundings and tax-free status. Access is heavily restricted, with people who do not live in Tucker's Town generally barred from the peninsula which extends along the southeastern edge of Castle Harbor.

Natural Arches Beach is located at the southern tip of the peninsula, where it joins with the mainland. This is Bermuda's most famous beach, and was noted for its natural rock formations and caves until they were largely destroyed by Hurricane Fabian in 2003.
