= Coney Island, Bermuda =

Island in Bermuda

Coordinates: 32°21′30″N 64°42′55″W

Location of Coney Island in Bermuda

Coney Island is part of the chain which makes up Bermuda. It is located in St. George's Parish, in the northeast of the territory.

The island cover 14.5 acres (5.9 hectares), close to the western entrance to Castle Harbor, southwest of St. George's Island and close to the southern entrance to Ferry Reach.

Coney Island's summit was once the site of a fake St. David's Lighthouse built in 1976 for the motion picture The Deep.
