= Church Bay, Bermuda =

Bay in Bermuda

Coordinates: 32°14′57″N 64°50′50″W

Church Bay is a bay with an accompanying beach in Southampton Parish, Bermuda. It serves as a popular snorkelling destination for locals.

There is a reef close to the shore, and fish including parrotfish gather in the bay. The beach is small and rocky.
