= Paget Island =

Island of Bermuda

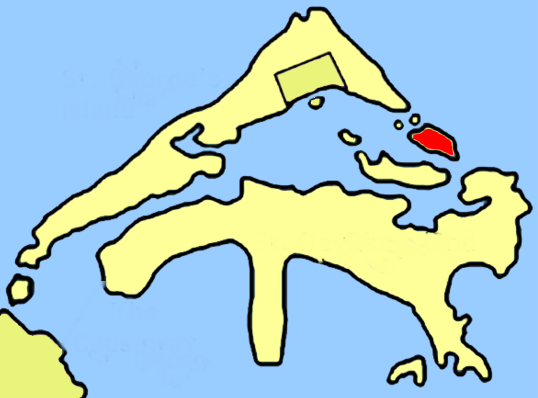
- Paget Island within Bermuda's 123 islands
- Etymology: William Paget

Geography
- Coordinates: 32°22′31″N 64°39′36″W
- Area: 14.5 ha (36 acres)

Administration
- Bermuda
- Parish: St. George's

Paget Island is an island in the St. George's Parish of the British overseas territory of Bermuda. It is located near a channel that connects the St. George's Harbor with the Atlantic ocean. It forms part of the Castle Group of islands, along with Darrell's Island and Nonsuch Island.

Paget Island is named after William Paget, 4th Baron Paget, who worked with the Virginia Company, which discovered Bermuda. The island's prominent feature is Fort Cunningham, which was first built in 1612 and has been restored several times over the years. The island has a freshwater pond, and supports mangroves and other biota.

== Etymology ==
Paget Island is named after William Paget, 4th Baron Paget of Beaudesert, who worked with the Virginia Company, which discovered Bermuda while on the way to set up trade in Virginia on the eastern coast of the United States. It was also known as Peniston's or Pennystones.

== History ==
The Paget Island and nearby Smith's Island were used as whaling centers. The island's prominent feature is Fort Cunningham. A fortified structure was constructed in 1612 by Richard Moore, the first Governor of Bermuda. A gun platform and additional coastal batteries were built in the 17th century to defend against enemy ships approaching the nearby St. George's Harbor. The fort was repaired several times over the years, and was used to house prisoners of war in the mid 18th century. In 1791, it was severely damaged by a storm, and was repaired extensively.

In 1797, British captain Francis Forbes Hinson bought the island and developed it as a farmland, and used it for whaling. He abandoned it later after suffering losses. The fort was rebuilt in 1875, and was renamed after British captain Thomas Cunningham. During the reconstruction, it was equipped with metal reinforced defensive shields and large gun turrets. In the early 20th century, the island was not used and the fort fell into disrepair. During the Second World War, the fort was used as a prisoner of war camp by the British War Department. It housed a juvenile training school from 1948 to the 1960s.

== Geography ==
Paget Island is located in the St. George's Parish of Bermuda. The 36 acres (15 ha) island is located near a channel that connects the St. George's Harbor with the Atlantic ocean. It forms part of the Castle Group of islands, along with Darrell's Island and Nonsuch Island.

The island is currently managed by the Bermuda National Trust and the Bermuda Audubon Society. There is a freshwater pond which supports the mangroves, and several biota. The island had a forest cover consisting of endemic Bermuda cedar, and other mangroves, which were heavily exploited for timber by the British. The island supports several bird species. The island has been affected by pollution from runoff water. It was restored in 1998 and has a boardwalk, which allows access to the pond.

== Access ==
The island itself is not allowed for regular public access. However, it is one of the nine camping sites approved by the government, that can be accessed with prior permission. There is a government run accommodation, which was upgraded in early 2026.
