= Bermuda Botanical Gardens =

Gardens in Paget Parish, Bermuda

Coordinates: 32.2915°N 64.7647°W

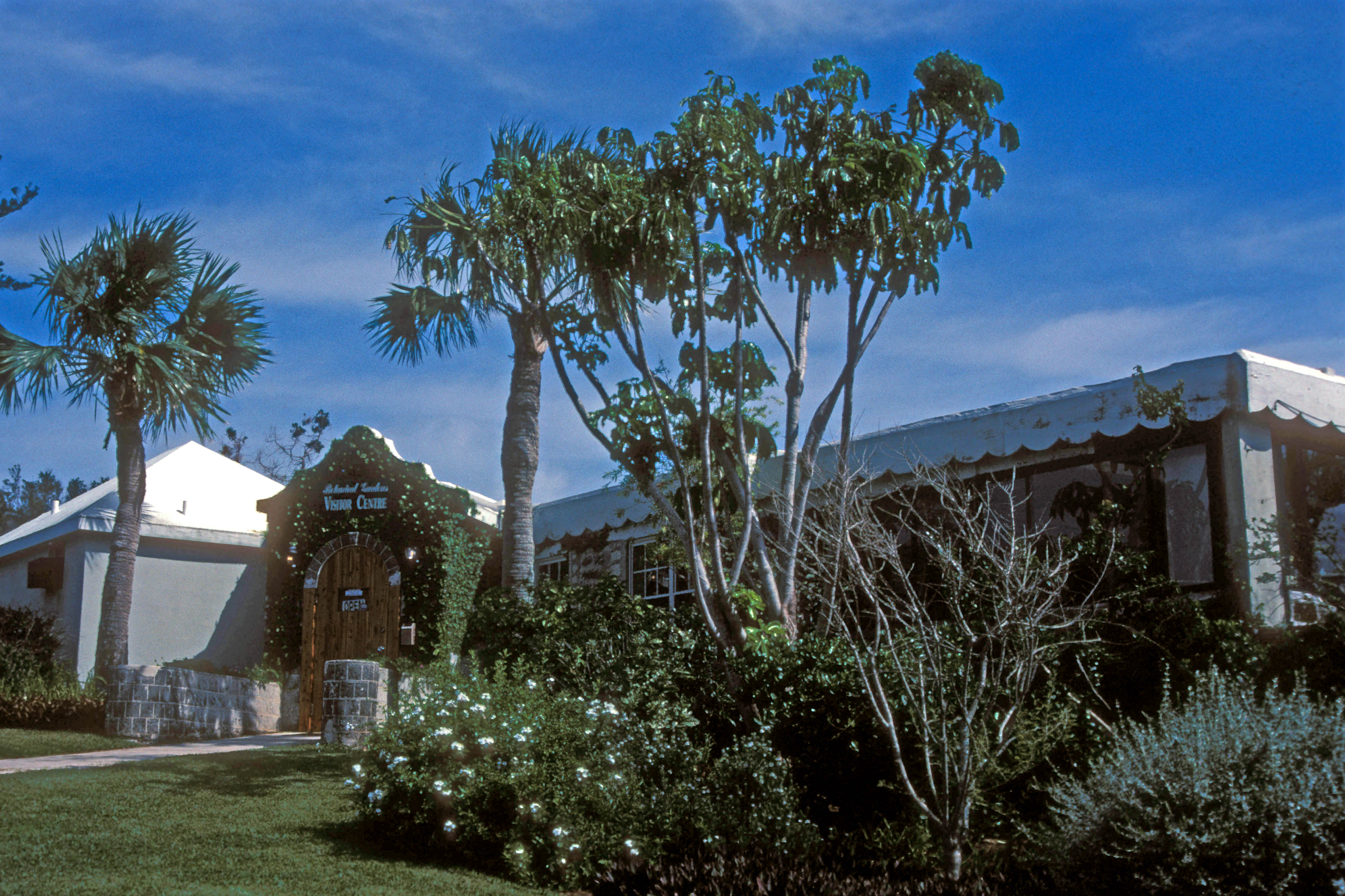
Bermuda Botanical Gardens

Bermuda Botanical Gardens features 36 acres (15 ha) of flowers, shrubs, and trees. The Botanical Gardens are in Paget Parish, Bermuda, a short drive from downtown Hamilton.

The Bermuda Botanical Gardens also includes Camden, the official residence of Bermuda's Premier, currently Mr. David Burt.

The gardens began with 10 acres of land purchased through the Public Garden Act 1896.
