= Hawkins Island, Bermuda =

Small island within Bermuda's Great Sound

Coordinates: 32°17′N 64°50′W

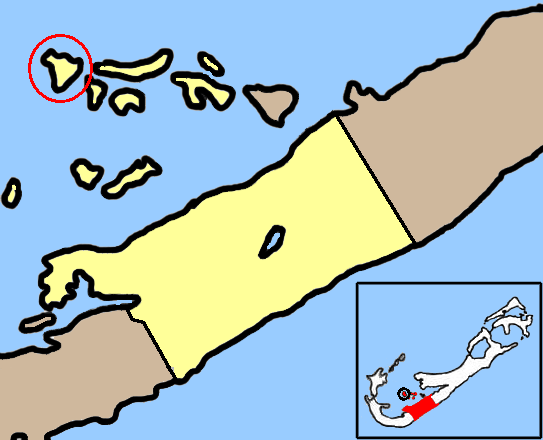
Map showing Hawkins Island

Hawkins Island is a small island within Bermuda's Great Sound. It lies in the southeast of the sound, and is in the north of Warwick Parish.

Originally named Elizabeth's or Tatem Island, it was renamed in 1809. Now privately owned by the Cox family, it was formerly the property of the Royal Navy, and was a prisoner of war camp from 1901 to 1902, during the South African War. The camp's watchtower yet stands, having been converted into a home. It is the most easterly of the group of islands stretching across the sound from the Salt Kettle peninsula.
