= St. George's Parish, Bermuda =

Parish of Bermuda

Coordinates: 32°22′18″N 64°40′32″W

Saint George's Parish is one of the nine parishes of Bermuda. It is named after the founder of the Bermuda colony, Admiral Sir George Somers.

It is located in the north-easternmost part of the island chain, containing a small part of the main island around Tucker's Town and the Tucker's Town Peninsula, as well as the island of Saint George's Island, and many smaller islands, notably Coney, Paget, Nonsuch, Castle, and Smith's Islands.

Technically, Saint George's also includes the island of Saint David's, though this is often considered a separate entity. St. David's Island, and Cooper's Island, and Longbird Island became a single, contiguous landmass during the Second World War construction of what is now L.F. Wade International Airport, formerly a joint USAAF/RAF base, Kindley Field (and subsequently a USAF base, Kindley Air Force Base, then a US Navy air station, NAS Bermuda.

The parish is joined to Hamilton Parish in the south, via The Causeway (which, like the Florida Keys in the United States, is a chain of small islands which have been connected by reclaimed land and bridges) and also at Tucker's Town. The parish is unique among those in Bermuda, in that it does not cover exactly 2.3 square miles (6.0 km^{2}). The reason for this is the land reclamation that took place when Kindley Air Force Base was constructed, which expanded the parish's area by some 150 acres (61 hectares) to a little over 2.5 square miles (6.5 km^{2}). It had a population of 5,659 in 2016, representing about 9 percent of the total Bermudan population.

Natural features in Saint George's include Castle Harbour, Saint George's Harbour, Saint David's Head, Tobacco Bay, and Ferry Reach.

Other notable features of Saint George's include the St. David's Lighthouse, Fort St. Catherine, and the Bermuda Biological Station for Research.

== Education ==
Primary schools:

- Saint George's Preschool
- Saint David's Preschool on St. David's
- Saint George's Primary School in Saint. George's
- East End Primary School on St. George's Island
- Saint David's Primary School on St. David's

Clearwater Middle School is located on St. David's. It opened on September 6, 1997 in the former Roger B. Chaffee High School with 155 students originating from the former St. George's Secondary School.
