= Devil's Hole, Bermuda =

Sinkhole

Coordinates: 32.320924°N 64.715245°W

Devil's Hole was a large water-filled sinkhole, close to the southeastern corner of Harrington Sound, Bermuda. At one time an littoral cave, it is fed by the Atlantic Ocean proper, rather than the far closer sound, via an underground estuary. It closed in 2009.

The hole got its name after the cave roof collapsed. The resultant open hole produces eerie sounds as the water rises and falls, which were thought by early settlers to be the Devil moaning.

It had been a tourist attraction since the 1830s, as it forms a natural tropical aquarium. Species range from green turtles to moray eels, and many species of reef fish can be found.

Devil's hole is also used as a landmark on the island. The landmark is a useful way for people to get their bearings on their surroundings relative to Harrington Sound. Devil's hole is 2 km (1.24 miles) from Flats village.
