= Harrington Sound =

Inland body of water in the northeast of the main island of Bermuda

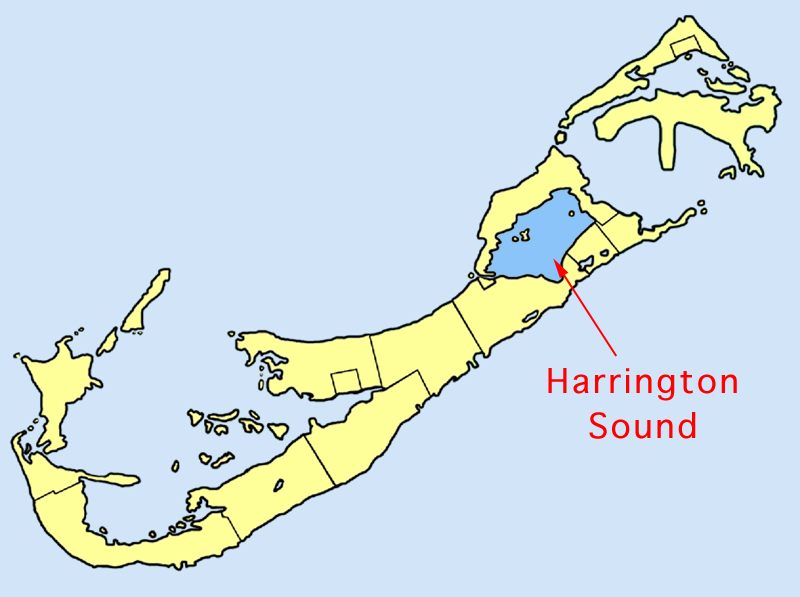
- Location of Harrington Sound
- Interactive map of Harrington Sound
- Coordinates: 32°19′45″N 64°43′24″W
- Primary outflows: Flatt's Inlet
- Basin countries: Bermuda
- Max. depth: 80 ft (24 m)

Harrington Sound is a large inland body of water in the northeast of the main island of Bermuda. It is surrounded by the main island on all sides, only appearing open to the ocean via a small channel called Flatt's Inlet in the southwest. Much of the sound's water flows to and from the ocean via cavern systems, notably Crystal Cave and Leamington Cave.

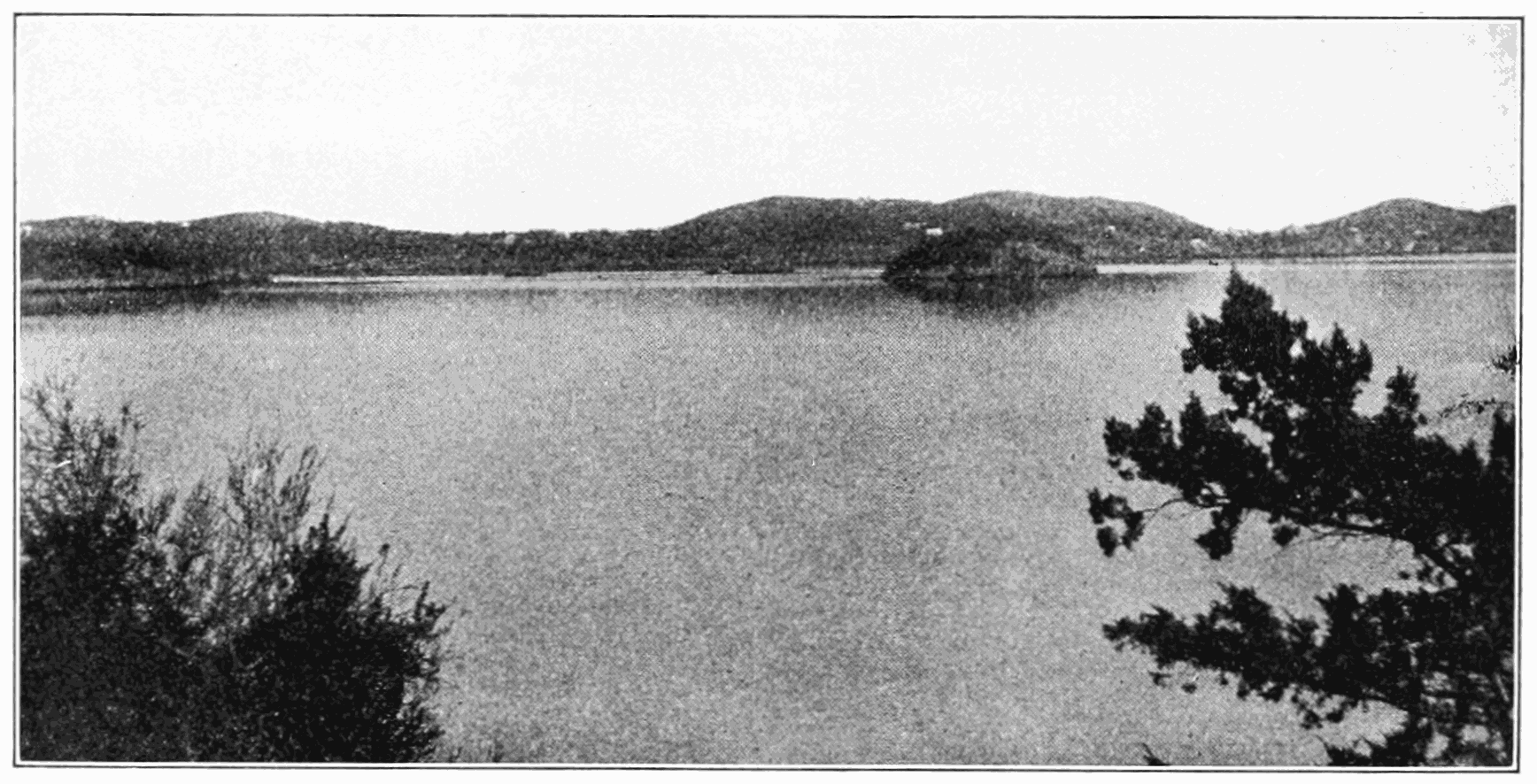
Harrington Sound (1904)

Harrington Sound is surrounded by the parishes of Smith's, Hamilton, and St. George's. It is well known for fishing, swimming, sailing and kayaking.

The sound was named for Lucy Harington, Countess of Bedford. She was an adventurer (shareholder) in the Somers Isles Company.

Local superstition stipulates the crater is bottomless. There are numerous small islands in the sound, notably Trunk Island.

As Bermuda's human population (and fishing) has increased there has been an equivalent drop in the populations of the sound's formerly abundant shellfish, such as Bermuda Scallops.
