= Tobacco Bay, Bermuda =

Bay in Bermuda

Coordinates: 32.3884°N 64.6792°W

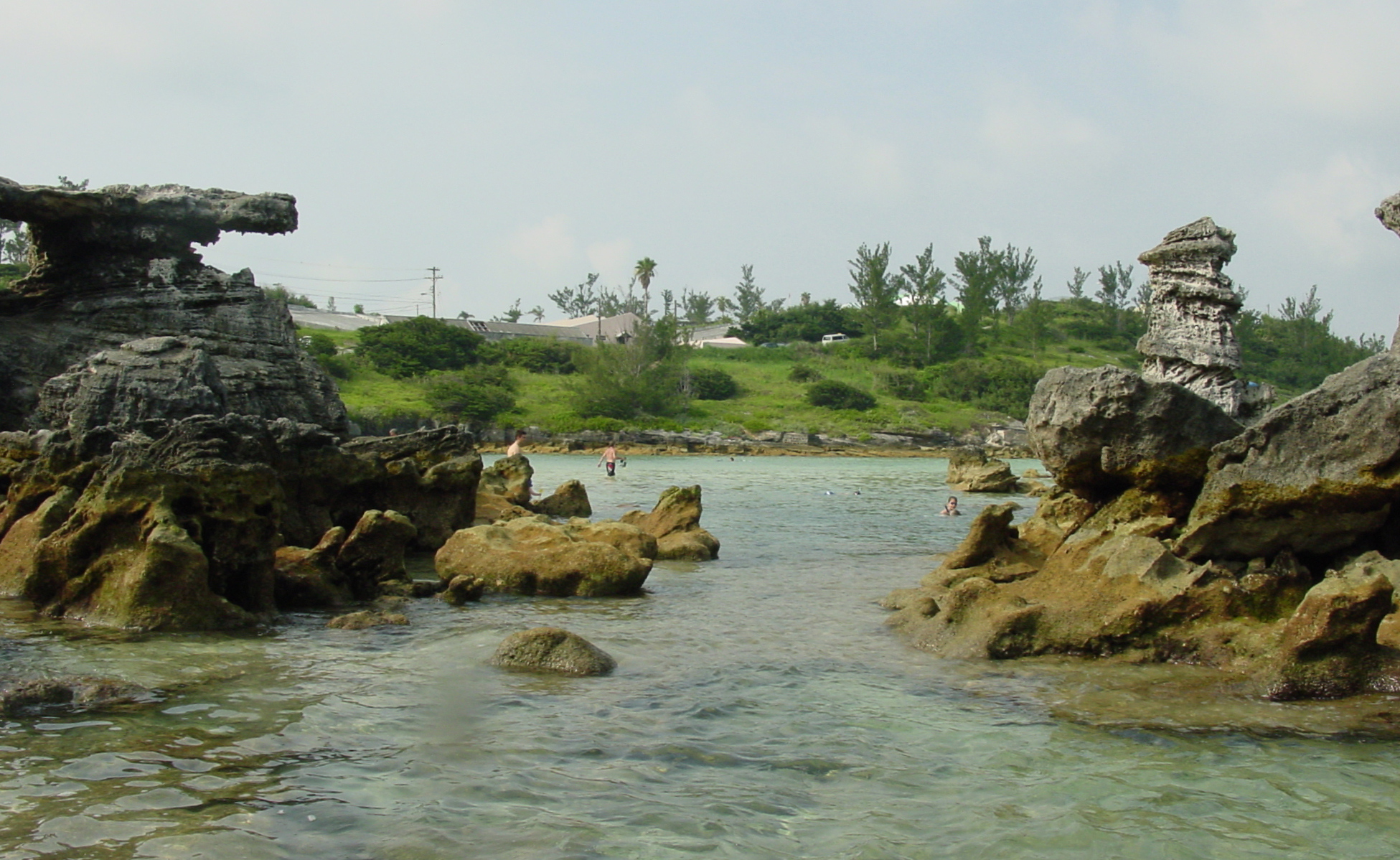
Tobacco Bay

Tobacco Bay is located in the far north of Bermuda. It lies on the Atlantic Ocean coast, close to the town of St. George's and to the historic Fort St. Catherine. One of Bermuda's national parks, it is a popular public beach. Snorkeling is a popular activity, as the bay has impressive underwater coral reefs, which explains its popularity with those who snorkel.

The bay was intimately connected with Bermuda's "Gunpowder Plot". On August 14, 1775, a group of Bermudians sympathetic to the Continental Congress stole gunpowder from the British Magazine in St. George's, rolled it across the island to Tobacco Bay and shipped it to America.

== Gallery ==
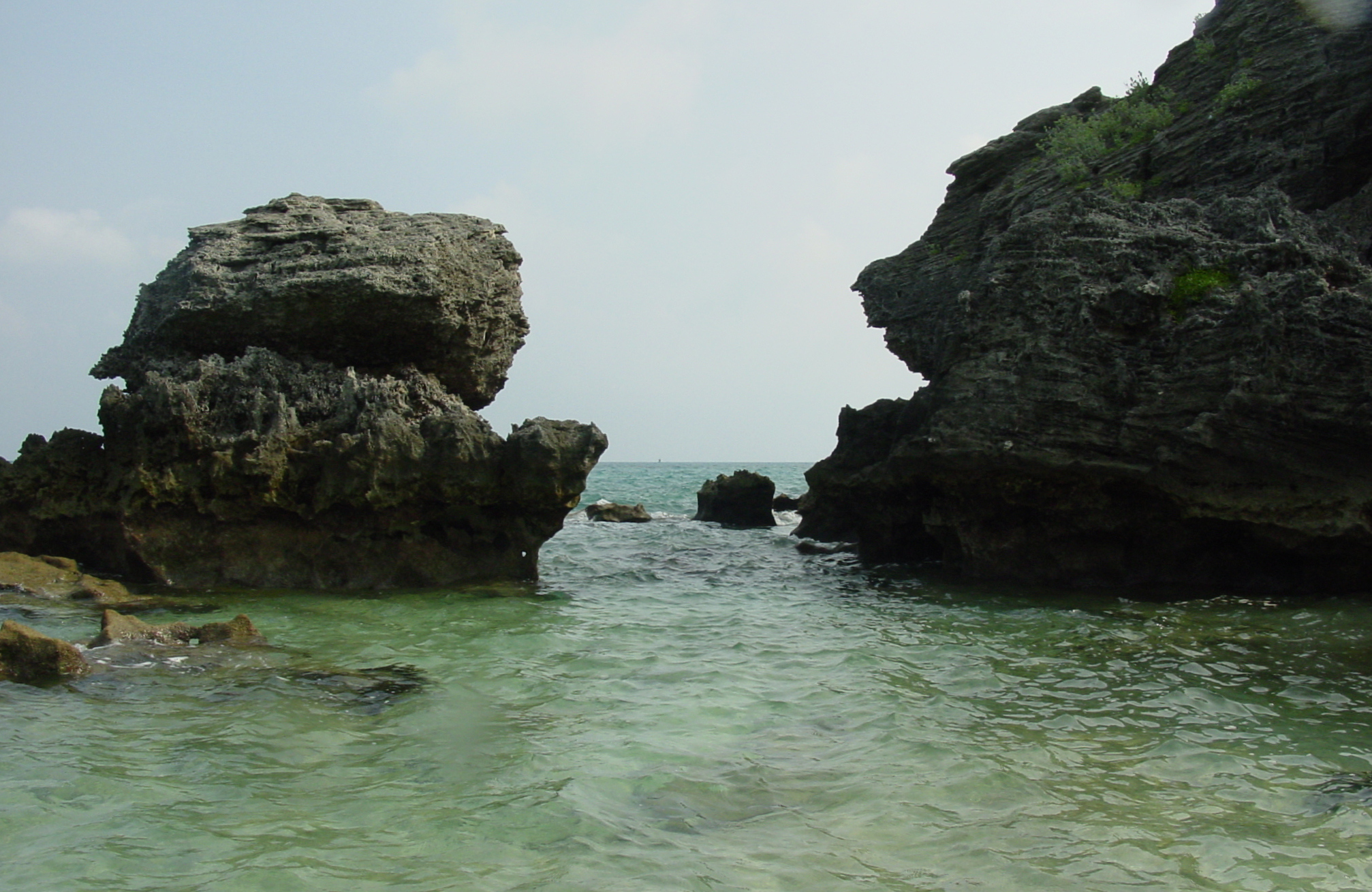

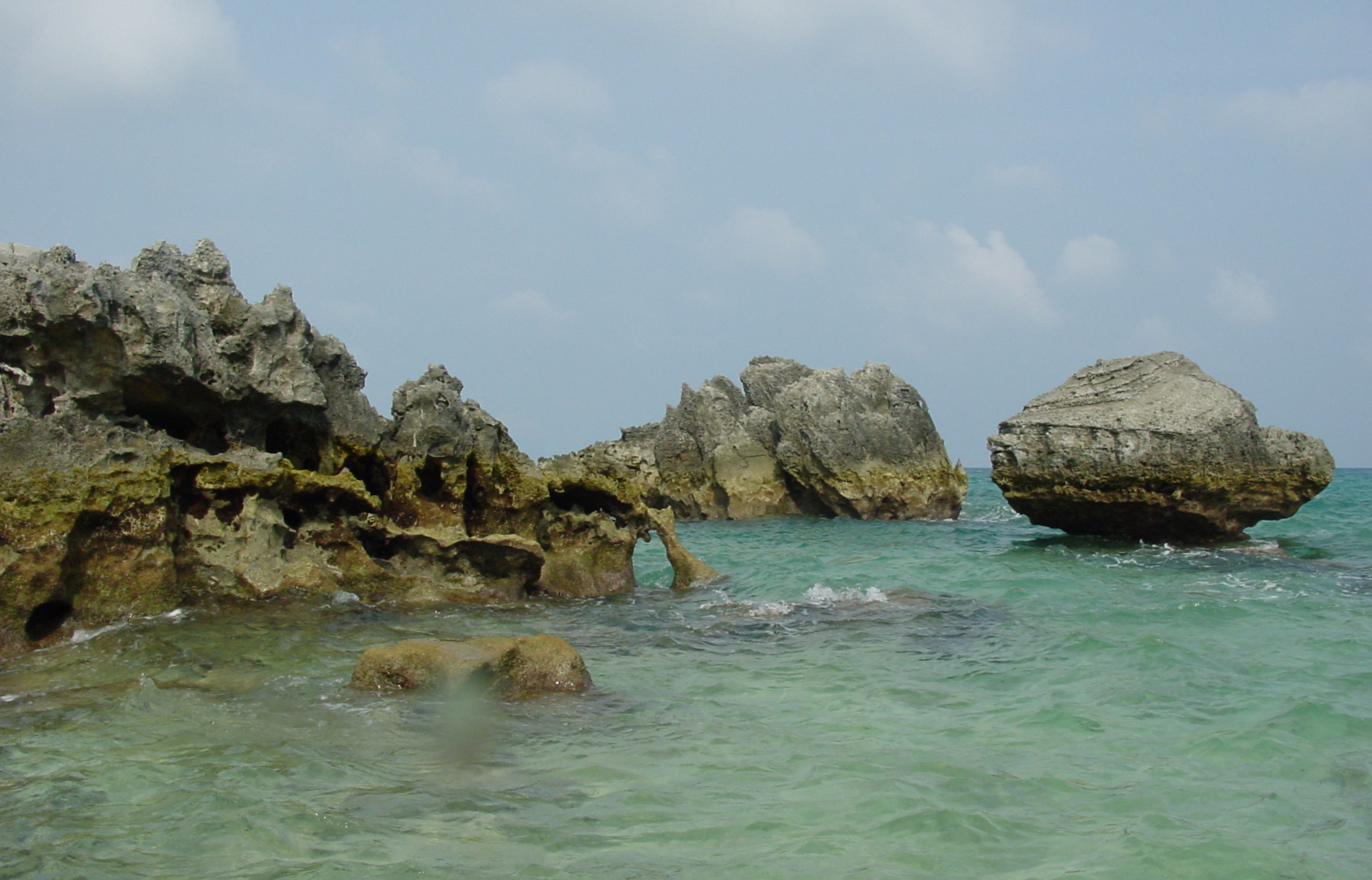

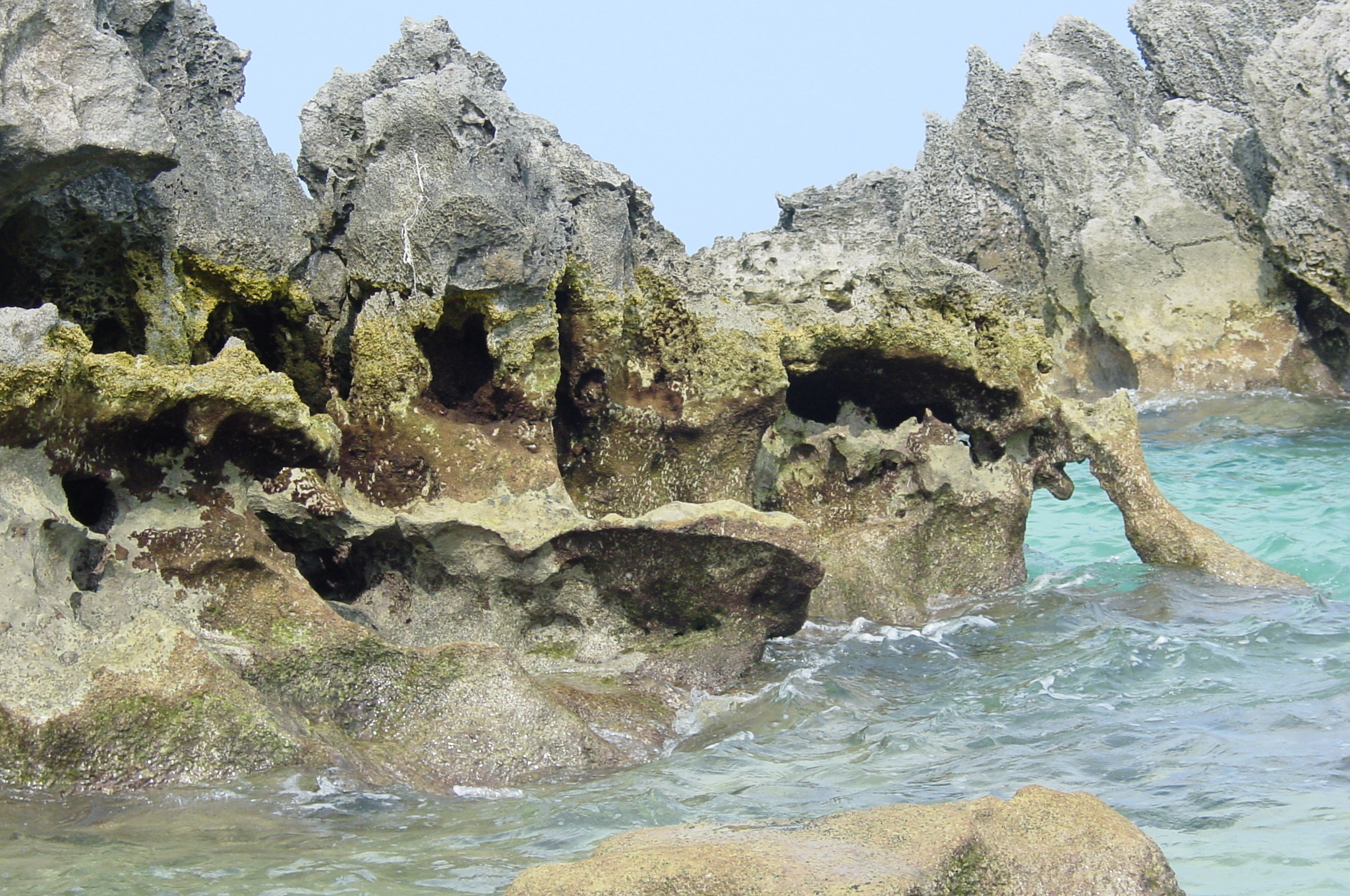
