= Smith's Island, Bermuda =

Isle in eastern Bermuda

Smith's Island
- Location of Smith's Island in Bermuda

Geography
- Location: St. George's Harbour, Bermuda
- Coordinates: 32.3715°N 64.6646°W
- Archipelago: Bermuda
- Area: 24.5 ha (61 acres)

Administration
- Bermuda
- Parish: St. George's Parish

Smith's Island is part of the chain which makes up Bermuda. It is located in St. George's Parish, in the northeast of the territory.

The 61 acres (0.25 km^{2}) island is located close to the northern entrance to St. George's Harbour, east of the town of St. George's to the south of the slightly smaller Paget Island and close to the coast of the much larger St. David's Island.

The island is the site of the first settlement in Bermuda, when Christopher Carter and Edward Waters built shelters there in 1610, and remained behind after other survivors of the 1609 wreck of Sea Venture sailed for Jamestown, Virginia. Edward Chard returned with George Somers later that year. Somers died while Chard and a ship's dog joined the Carter and Waters. Sometimes dubbed the "Three Kings of Bermuda", Waters, Carter, and Chard hunted, fished, and farmed the land. The Somers Isles Company had supplied Carter, Chard, and Waters 81 varieties of seeds to trial garden, including tobacco, maize, and watermelon.

The first official colonists arrived on the Plough two years later (on July 11, 1612). Company man Richard Moore acted as deputy governor for the 50-60 settlers, who originally settled Smith's Island but then moved to St. David's Island for better access to fresh water. Carter, Chard, and Waters relocated to St. George's Island in autumn 1612.

When the smallpox pandemic threatened the public health safety of Bermuda in the 1730s, Smallpox Bay (on the eastern side Smith's Island) was a site of ship and passenger quarantine.

Like other Bermuda demonyms, Smith's Island was named in tribute to Governor Thomas Smythe (whose surname was spelled several ways), an investor of the Somers Isles Company.
