= Crystal Cave, Bermuda =

Cave in Bermuda

Crystal Cave
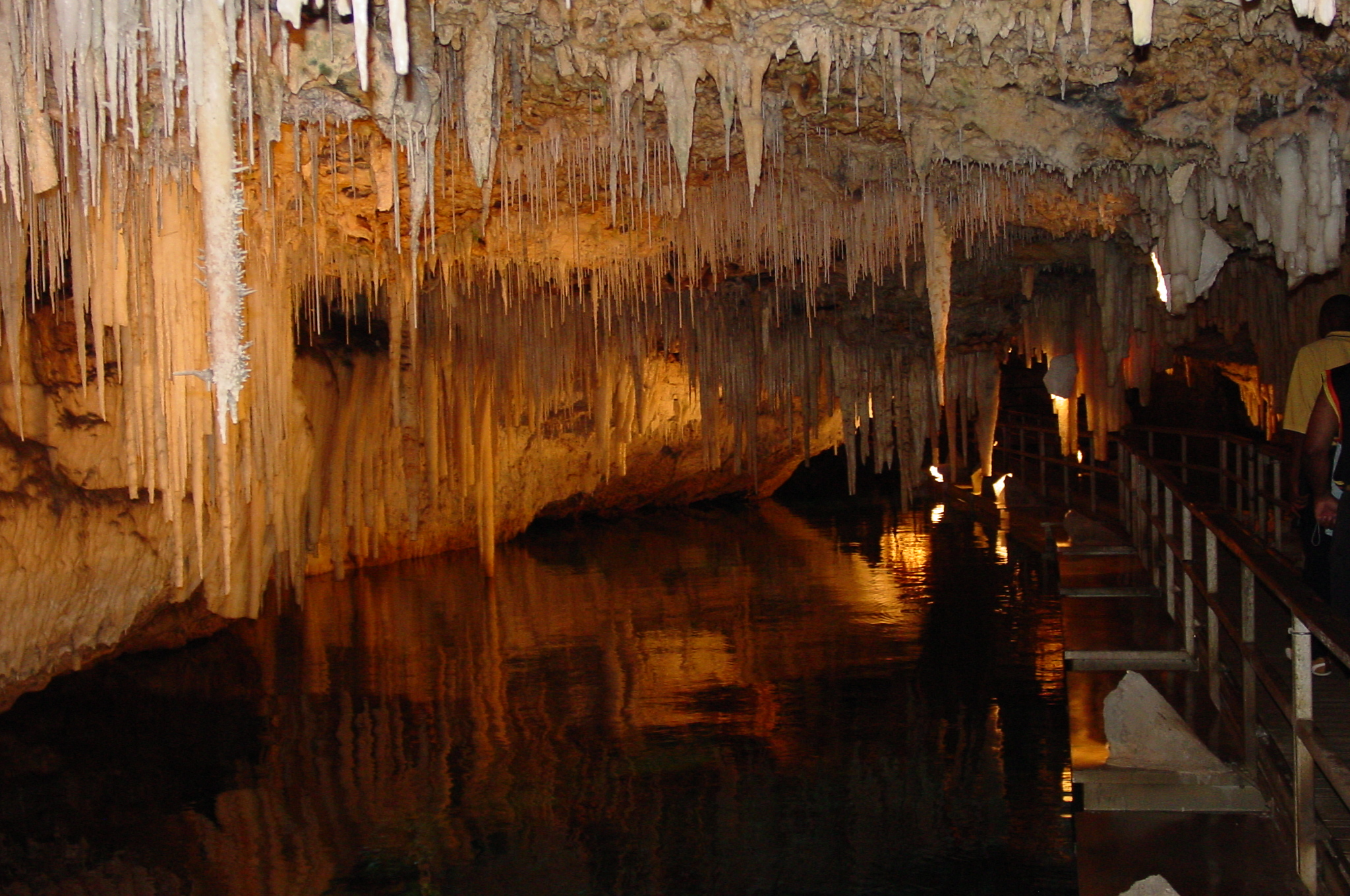
- The cave in 2004
- Interactive map of Crystal Cave
- Location: Hamilton, Bermuda
- Coordinates: 32°20′58″N 64°42′48″W
- Depth: c. 60 meters
- Length: c. 500 meters
- Discovery: 1905 by Carl Gibbons and Edgar Hollis

Crystal Cave is a cave in the British overseas territory of Bermuda. It is located in Hamilton Parish, close to Castle Harbour. The cave is around 500 meters long, and 62 meters deep. The lower 19–20 meters of the cave are below water level. The cave formed at a time when the sea level was lower; as the sea level rose, many cave formations which formed above water became submerged.

A tourist attraction since 1907, it was discovered in 1905 by Carl Gibbons and Edgar Hollis, two 12-year-old boys searching for a lost cricket ball. Soon after, the Wilkinson family (the owners of the property since 1884) learned of the discovery. Mr. Percy Wilkinson lowered his 14-year-old son Bernard into it with a bicycle lamp on 140 feet of strong rope tied to a tree to explore the cave.

The area surrounding Harrington Sound (which lies to the south of Crystal Cave) is of limestone formation and is noted for its many subterranean waterways, through which the waters of the sound empty into the Atlantic Ocean. Crystal Cave is one of these, and, as its name suggests, is known for its beauty, with many stalactites, stalagmites and deep, clear pools. However, some crystal formations have been damaged by earthquakes in the distant past.

An excursion to Crystal Cave also includes the neighbouring Fantasy Cave, with Fantasy being deeper (88 steps down). Fantasy Cave was reopened in the summer of 2001 with all the pathways rebuilt and re-illuminated by artificial lighting. It was discovered and opened about the same time as Crystal Cave, but was closed by the owners in the 1940s.

The two caves located on 8 Crystal Caves Rd. at Wilkinson Ave. are accessible by bus going between Hamilton and St. George's Parishes, taxi and other private forms of transportation (including motorbike and bicycle). Outside the two caves is a sub-tropical garden lined with palm trees where many species of trees and flowers are located.

The caves are owned by the local Wilkinson Trust and are open to the public.

== Gallery ==
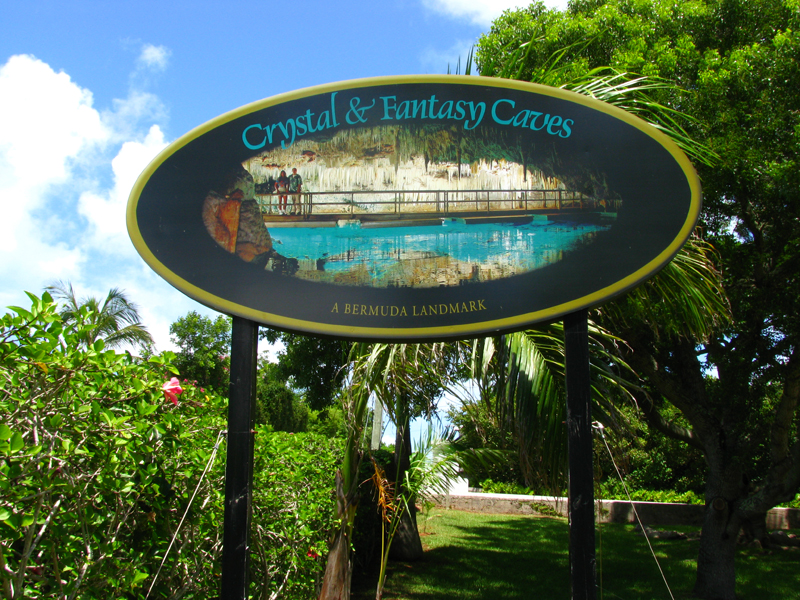

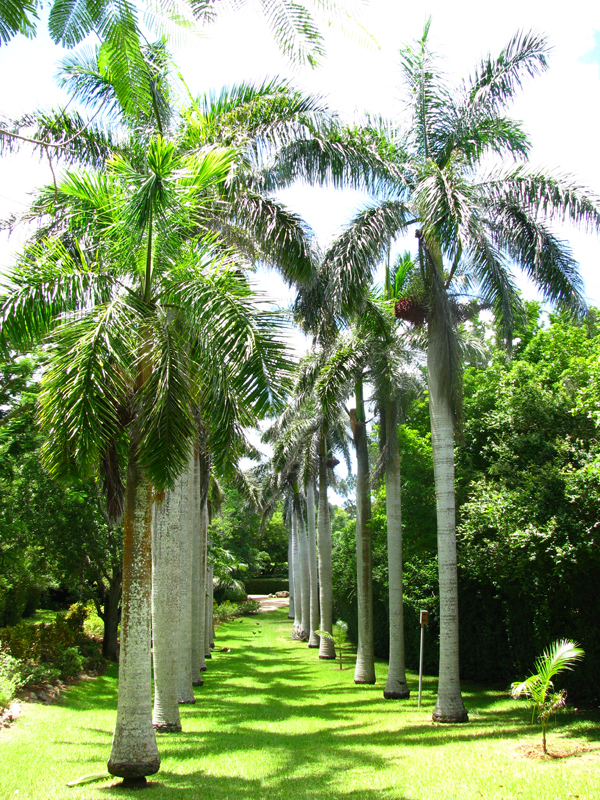

Crystal Cave

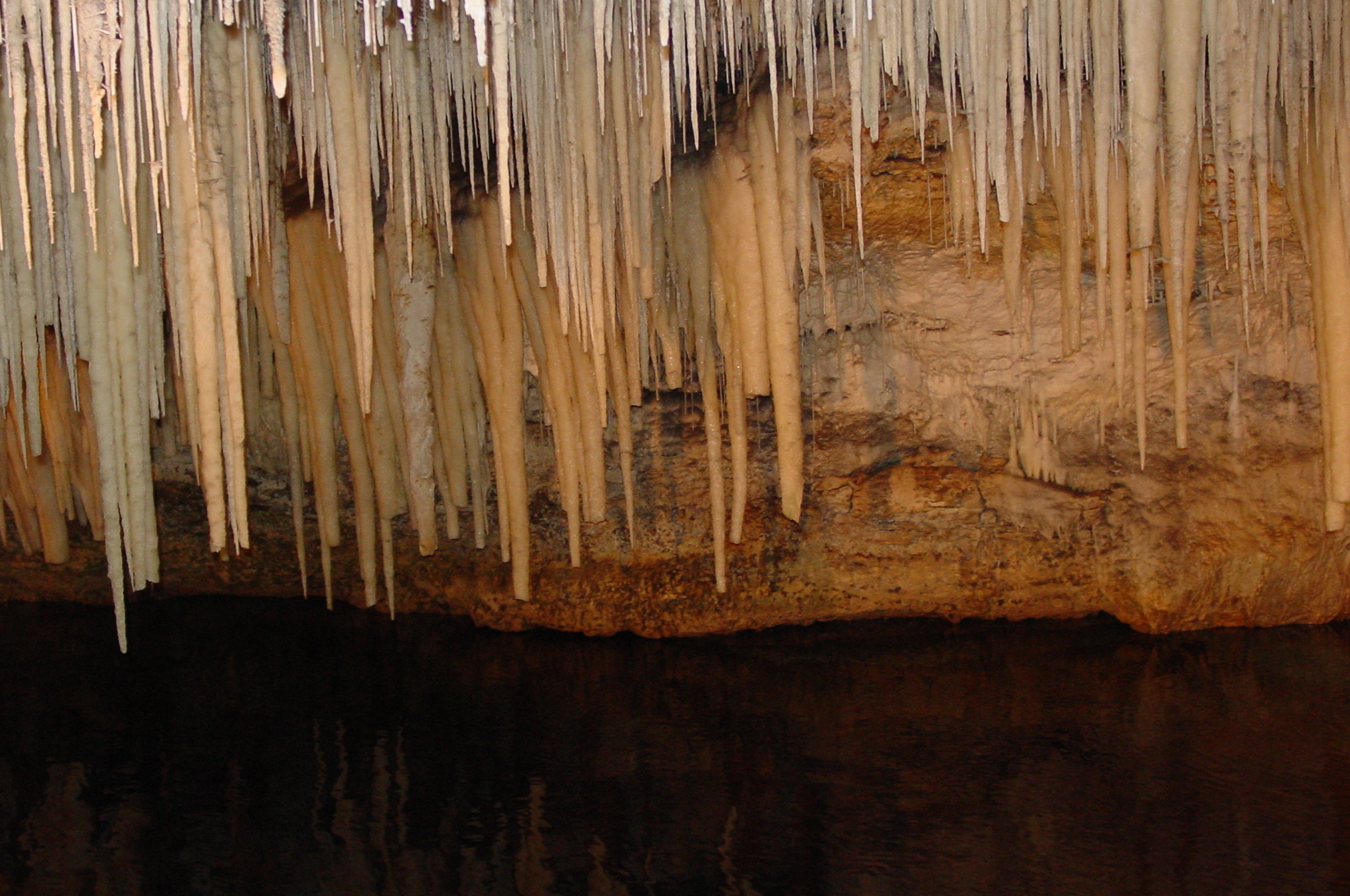

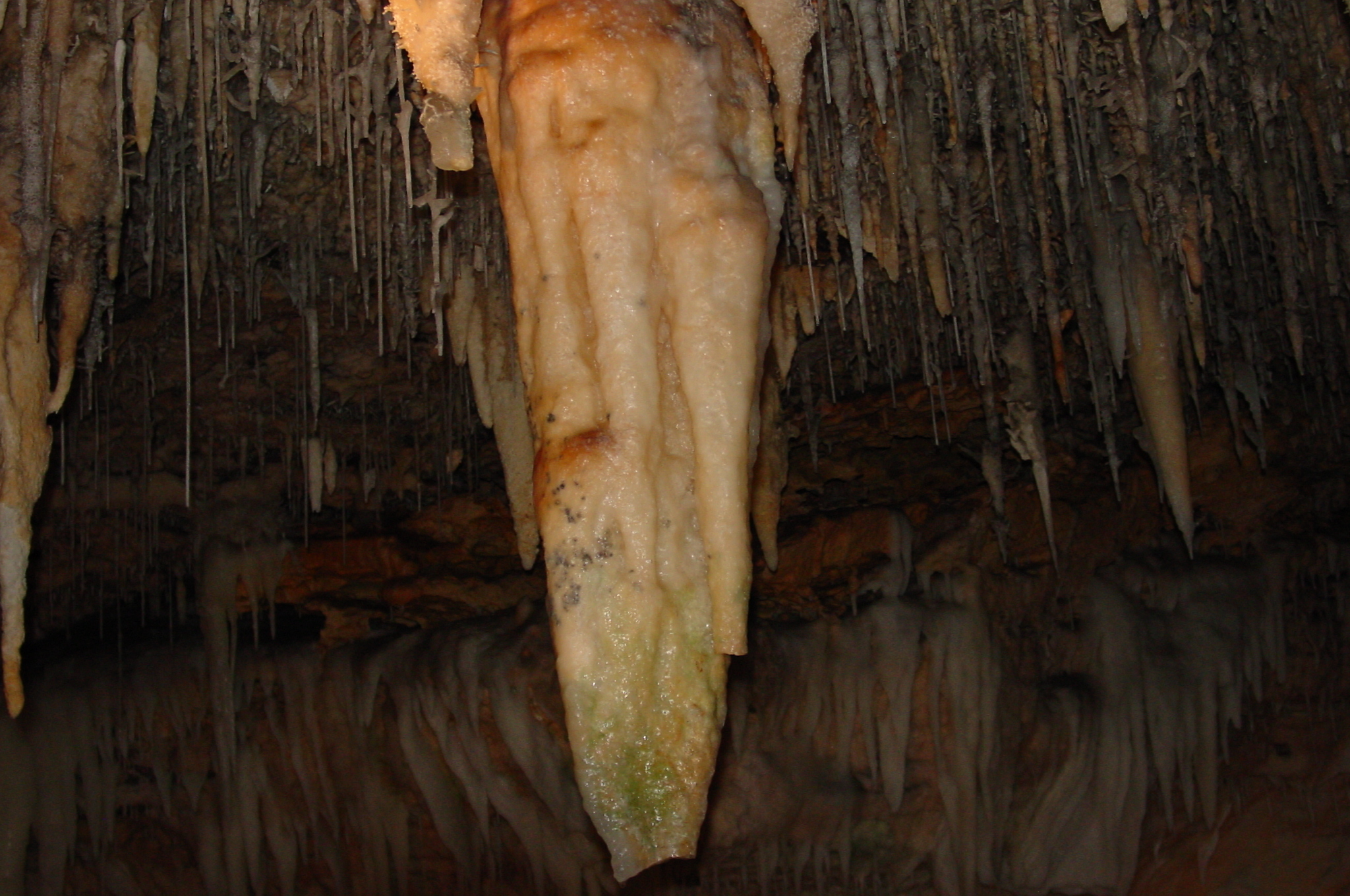

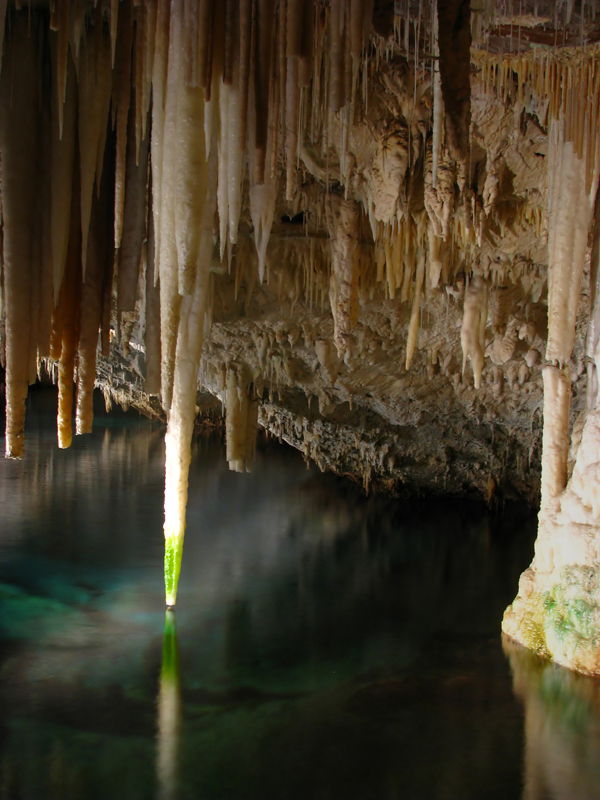

Fantasy Cave

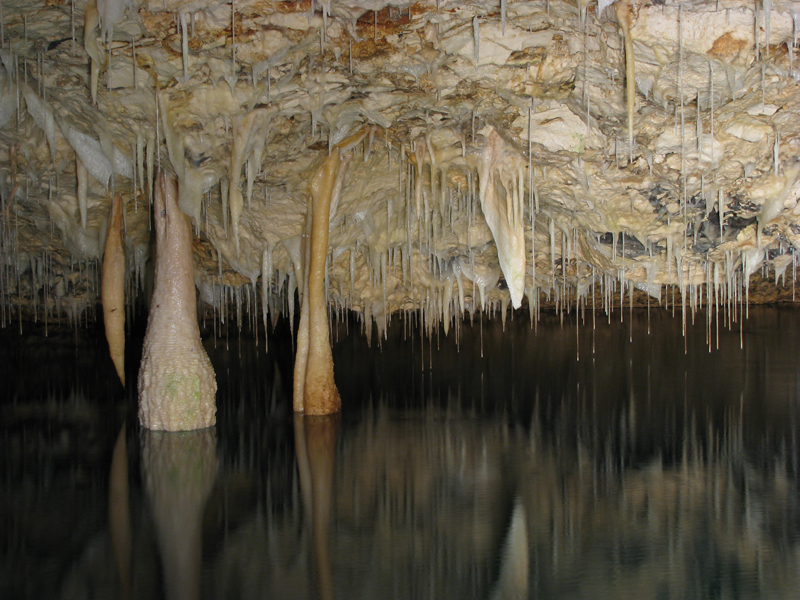

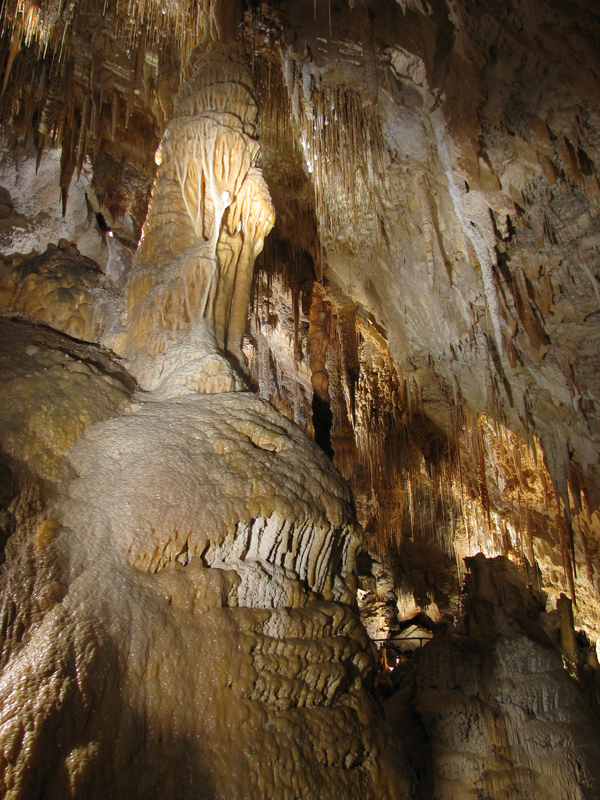

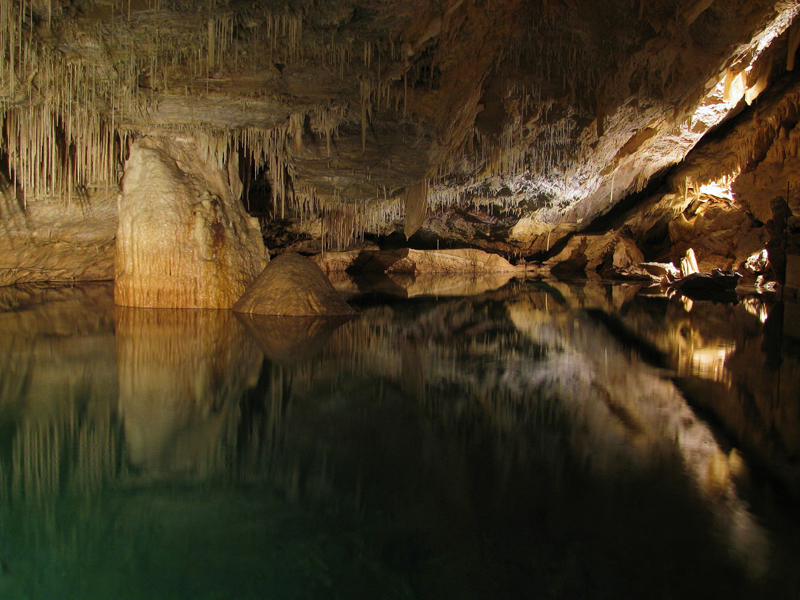
