= Great Sound =

Large ocean inlet (a sound) in Bermuda

Coordinates: 32°17′15″N 64°50′13″W

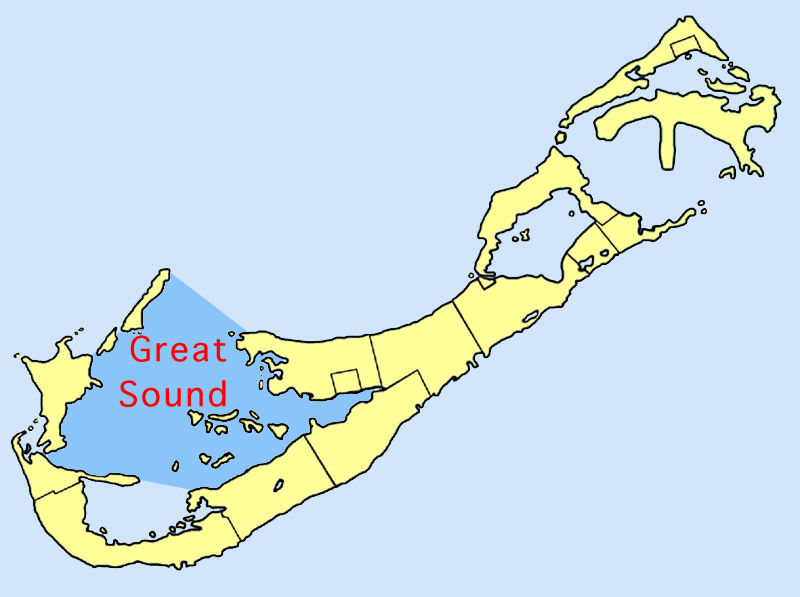

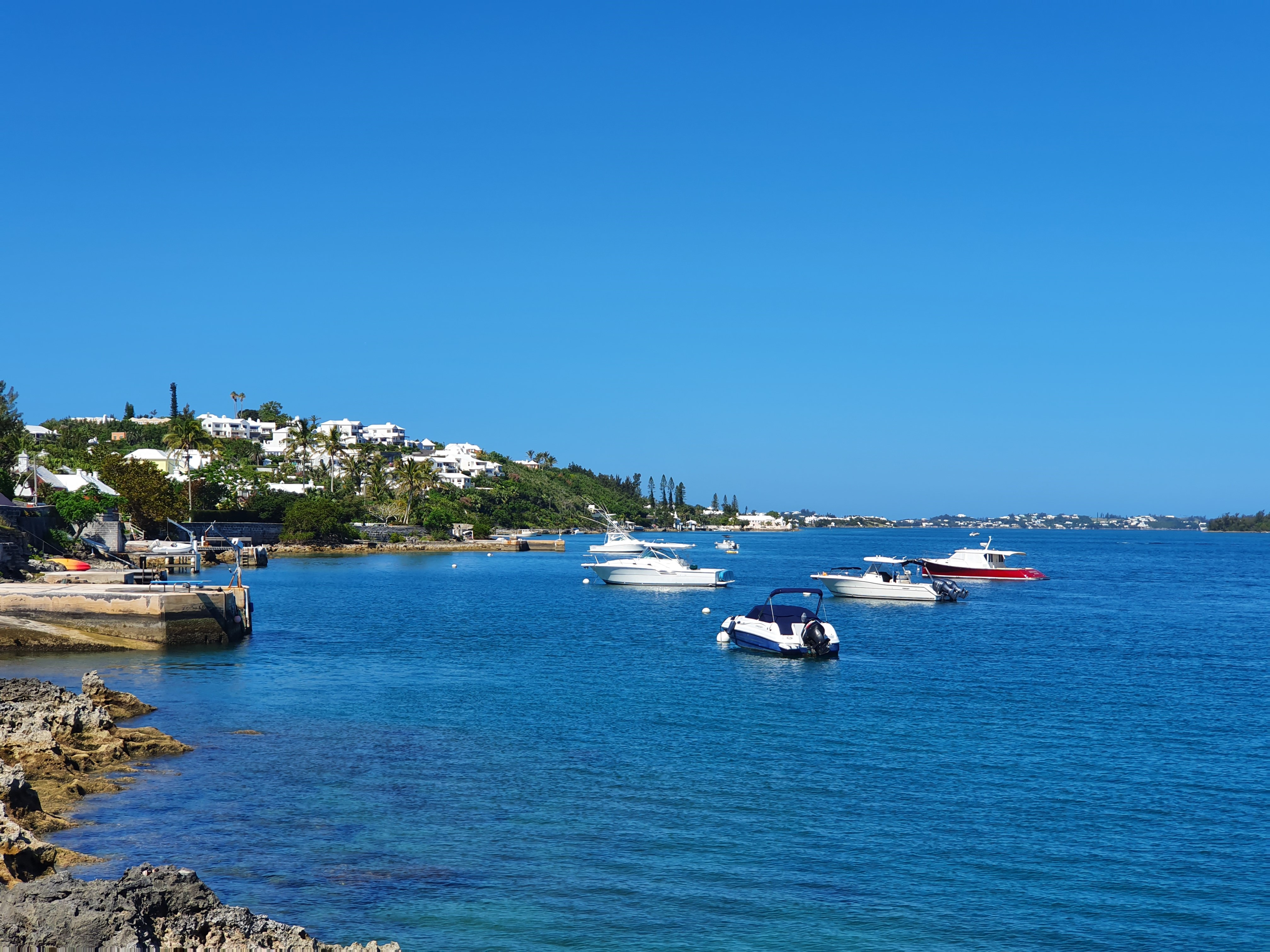

The Great Sound is large ocean inlet (a sound) located in Bermuda. It may be the submerged remains of a Pre-Holocene volcanic caldera. Other geologists dispute the origin of the Bermuda Pedestal as a volcanic hotspot.

== Geography ==
The Great Sound dominates the southwest of the island chain and forms a natural harbour. It is surrounded on all sides by islands, except for the northeast, where it is open to the Atlantic Ocean.

=== Peninsulas ===
To the south, two small peninsulas jut into the sound separating it from the smaller Little Sound. In the east, the Great Sound narrows to form Hamilton Harbour. Bermuda's capital, Hamilton, is on the northern shore of this harbour.

=== Islands ===
Islands within the Great Sound

Numerous islands lie within the Great Sound, most of them on the southeastern side of it, including Darrell's Island, Hawkins Island, Hinson's Island, Long Island, Marshall's Island, and Watling Island. Most of these were obtained by the Royal Navy during the nineteenth century and used for various naval purposes. Several were used by the army during the Second Boer War for a prisoner-of-war camp; Agar's Island was used by the army at this time as a munitions depot.

== History ==
During the Second World War, Great Sound was the location several military installations: The United States Navy's Naval Operating Base, the Royal Naval Dockyard, on Ireland Island, RAF Darrell's Island, and Royal Naval Air Station Bermuda, on Boaz Island.
