= Outline of Bermuda =

British Overseas Territory in the North Atlantic Ocean

The Flag of Bermuda

The Coat of arms of Bermuda

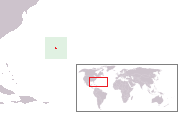
The location of Bermuda

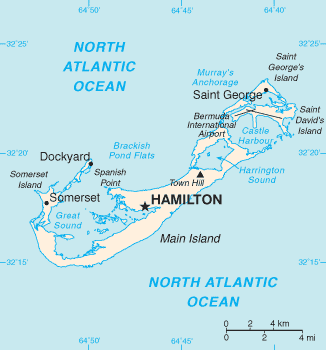
An enlargeable map of the British Overseas Territory of the Bermuda Islands

The following outline is provided as an overview of and topical guide to Bermuda:

Bermuda – a British overseas territory located in the North Atlantic Ocean. Located off the east coast of the United States, it is situated around 1770 km (1,100 mi) northeast of Miami, Florida, and 1350 km (840 mi) south of Halifax, Nova Scotia, Canada. The nearest landmass is Cape Hatteras, North Carolina, about 1030 km (640 mi) west-northwest. Bermuda is the oldest and most populous remaining British overseas territory, having been settled by English forces a century before the Acts of Union created the Kingdom of Great Britain. Bermuda has a highly affluent economy, with a large financial sector and tourism industry giving it the world's highest GDP per capita in 2005. It has a subtropical climate, beaches with pink sand, and cerulean blue ocean.

== General reference ==
- Pronunciation:
- Common English country names: Bermuda or the Bermuda Islands
- Official English country name: Bermuda Islands
- Common endonym(s):
- Official endonym(s):
- Adjectival(s): Bermudian
- Demonym(s):
- ISO country codes: BM, BMU, 060
- ISO region codes: See ISO 3166-2:BM
- Internet country code top-level domain: .bm

== Geography of Bermuda ==
Geography of Bermuda

- Bermuda is: a British overseas territory, consisting of approximately 138 islands
- Location:
  - Northern Hemisphere and Western Hemisphere
    - North America, off the East Coast of the United States
  - Atlantic Ocean
    - North Atlantic
  - Time zone: Atlantic Standard Time (UTC-04), Atlantic Daylight Time (UTC-03)
  - Extreme points of Bermuda
    - Highest: Town Hill 76 m (249 ft)
    - Lowest: North Atlantic Ocean 0 m
    - Northernmost: Fort St. Catherine 32°23'27.5"N
    - Southernmost: Unnamed headland between Boat Bay and Sinky Bay 32°14'48.9"N (although there are reefs and skerries that lie farther south, it is debatable as to whether these are "land").
    - Westernmost: Islet off Wreck Hill Estate 64°53'15.2"W
    - Easternmost: Prominent but unnamed skerry east of Annie's Bay 64°38'47.4"W (not counting reefs that lie somewhat farther east)
  - Land boundaries: none
  - Coastline: 103 km
- Population of Bermuda: 66,163(2007) - 205th most populous country
- Area of Bermuda: 53.3 square kilometres (20.6 sq mi) - 224th largest country
- Atlas of Bermuda

=== Environment of Bermuda ===
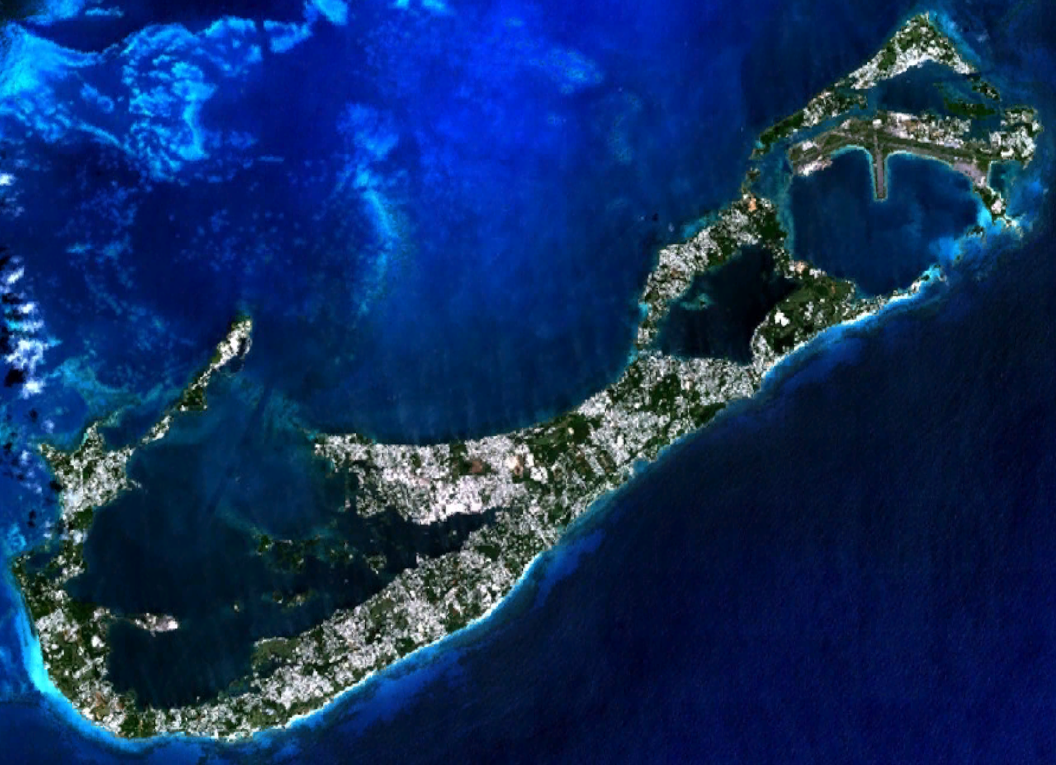
An enlargeable satellite image of the Bermuda Islands

- Climate of Bermuda
- Environmental issues in Bermuda
- Renewable energy in Bermuda
- Geology of Bermuda
- Protected areas of Bermuda
  - Biosphere reserves in Bermuda
  - National parks of Bermuda
- Wildlife of Bermuda
  - Flora of Bermuda
  - Fauna of Bermuda
    - Birds of Bermuda
    - Mammals of Bermuda
- Energy in Bermuda

==== Natural geographic features of Bermuda ====
- Fjords of Bermuda
- Glaciers of Bermuda
- Islands of Bermuda
- Lakes of Bermuda
- Mountains of Bermuda
  - Volcanoes in Bermuda
- Rivers of Bermuda
  - Waterfalls of Bermuda
- Valleys of Bermuda
- World Heritage Sites in Bermuda

=== Regions of Bermuda ===
Regions of Bermuda

==== Ecoregions of Bermuda ====
List of ecoregions in Bermuda

==== Administrative divisions of Bermuda ====
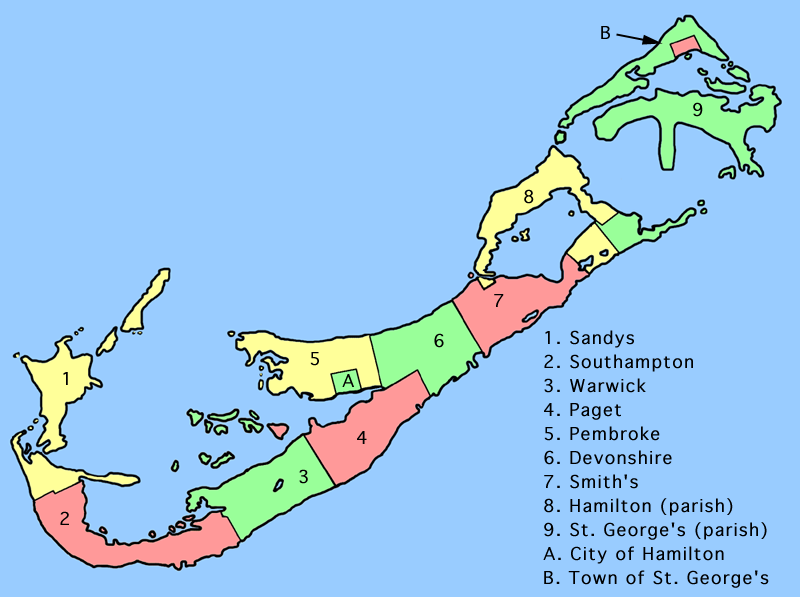
The parishes of Bermuda

Administrative divisions of Bermuda (9 Parishes)

===== Municipalities of Bermuda =====
Municipalities of Bermuda

- Capital of Bermuda: Hamilton
- Cities of Bermuda

=== Demography of Bermuda ===
Demographics of Bermuda

== Government and politics of Bermuda ==
Politics of Bermuda

- Form of government: parliamentary representative democratic dependency
- Capital of Bermuda: Hamilton
- Elections in Bermuda
- Political parties in Bermuda

=== Branches of government ===
Government of Bermuda

==== Executive branch of the government of Bermuda ====
- Head of state: Monarch of the United Kingdom, King Charles III
  - Monarch's representative: Governor of Bermuda
- Head of government: Premier of Bermuda
- Cabinet of Bermuda - its 14 members are selected by the Premier from among members of the bicameral parliament
  - Premier: Hon. Craig Cannonier
  - Minister of Tourism: Ewart Brown
  - Minister of Transport: Ewart Brown
  - Minister of Finance: Paula A Cox
  - Minister of Health & Family Services: Michael Scott
  - Minister of Justice: Philip Perinchief
  - Minister of Labour Home Affairs and Public Safety: K H Randolph Horton
  - Minister of Education: Terry E Lister
  - Minister of the Environment: Neletha I Butterfield
  - Minister of Community Affairs & Sport: Dale D Butler
  - Minister of Works & Engineering: David Burch
  - Minister of Housing: David Burch
  - Minister of National Drug Control: Wayne Perinchief
  - Minister without Portfolio: Walter Lister

==== Legislative branch of the government of Bermuda ====
- Parliament of Bermuda (bicameral)
  - Upper house: Senate of Bermuda - its 11 seats are appointed by the Governor
  - Lower house: House of Assembly of Bermuda

==== Judicial branch of the government of Bermuda ====
Court system of Bermuda

- Supreme Court of Bermuda

=== Foreign relations of Bermuda ===
Foreign relations of Bermuda

- Diplomatic missions in Bermuda
- Diplomatic missions of Bermuda

==== International organization membership ====
The government of the Bermuda Islands is a member of:

- Caribbean Community and Common Market (Caricom) (associate)
- International Criminal Police Organization (Interpol) (subbureau)
- International Olympic Committee (IOC)
- International Trade Union Confederation (ITUC)
- Universal Postal Union (UPU)
- World Customs Organization (WCO)
- World Federation of Trade Unions (WFTU)

=== Law and order in Bermuda ===
Law of Bermuda

- Constitution of Bermuda
- Crime in Bermuda
- Human rights in Bermuda
  - LGBT rights in Bermuda
  - Freedom of religion in Bermuda
- Law enforcement in Bermuda

=== Military of Bermuda ===
Military of Bermuda

- Command
  - Commander-in-chief:
    - Ministry of Defence of Bermuda
- Forces
  - Army of Bermuda
  - Navy of Bermuda
  - Air Force of Bermuda
  - Special forces of Bermuda
- Military history of Bermuda
- Military ranks of Bermuda

=== Local government in Bermuda ===
Local government in Bermuda

== History of Bermuda ==
History of Bermuda

- List of Bermuda Triangle incidents
- Bermuda Admiralty Case
- Bermuda Militia 1612–1687
- Bermuda Militia 1687–1813
- Bermuda Militia 1813
- Bermuda Militias 1612–1815
- Hurricane Fabian
- Royal Air Force, Bermuda (1939–1945)
- Sea Venture
- George Somers
- Somers Isles Company
- Thomas Gates (governor)
- USN Submarine Base, Ordnance Island, Bermuda
- London Company

== Culture of Bermuda ==
Culture of Bermuda

- Architecture of Bermuda
- Cuisine of Bermuda
- Languages of Bermuda
- National symbols of Bermuda
  - Coat of arms of Bermuda
  - Flag of Bermuda
  - National anthem of Bermuda
- People of Bermuda
- Public holidays in Bermuda
- Religion in Bermuda
  - Christianity in Bermuda
    - Anglican Church of Bermuda
  - Hinduism in Bermuda
  - Islam in Bermuda

=== Art in Bermuda ===
- Music of Bermuda
- Television in Bermuda

=== Sports in Bermuda ===
Sports in Bermuda

- Basketball in Bermuda
  - Bermuda national basketball team
- Football in Bermuda
  - Bermuda national football team
  - Bermuda National Stadium
- Bermuda at the Olympics
  - Bermuda at the 1976 Summer Olympics
  - Bermuda at the 1988 Summer Olympics
  - Bermuda at the 2000 Summer Olympics
  - Bermuda at the 2004 Summer Olympics
  - Bermuda at the 2006 Winter Olympics

== Economy and infrastructure of Bermuda ==
Economy of Bermuda

- Economic rank, by nominal GDP (2007):
- Communications in Bermuda
  - Internet in Bermuda
  - Postage stamps and postal history of Bermuda
- Companies of Bermuda
- Financial sector of Bermuda
  - Bermuda Monetary Authority
  - Currency of Bermuda: Dollar
  - Former currency: Bermudian pound
    - ISO 4217: BMD
  - Bermuda Stock Exchange
- Transport in Bermuda
  - Air transport in Bermuda
    - Airlines of Bermuda
    - Airports in Bermuda
      - Bermuda International Airport
  - Rail transport in Bermuda

== Education in Bermuda ==
Education in Bermuda

- List of schools in Bermuda

== See also ==
Bermuda

- Index of Bermuda-related articles
- List of Bermuda-related topics
- List of international rankings
- Outline of geography
- Outline of North America
- Outline of the United Kingdom
