= Index of Bermuda-related articles =

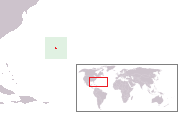
The location of the British Overseas Territory of the Bermuda Islands

The following is an alphabetical list of topics related to the British Overseas Territory of the Bermuda Islands.

== 0–9 ==
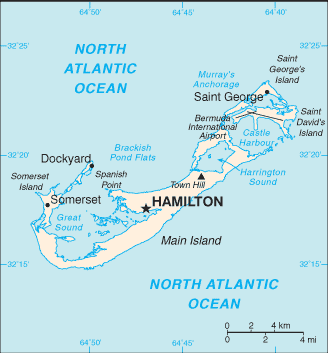
A map of the Bermuda Islands

- .bm–Internet country code top-level domain for Bermuda

== A ==
- ACE Ltd.
- Americas
  - North America
    - Northern America
      - North Atlantic Ocean
        - Bermuda Islands
- Anglican Church of Bermuda
- Anglo-America
- Annie's Bay, Bermuda
- Anselm Genders
- Antonio Pierce
- Area code 441
- Arthur Heber Browne
- Ashley House (Paget Parish, Bermuda)
- Atlas of Bermuda
- Azeem Pitcher

== B ==
- The Bank of Bermuda
- Bermuda Aquarium, Museum and Zoo
- Bermuda at the 1930 British Empire Games
- Bermuda at the 1976 Summer Olympics
- Bermuda at the 1988 Summer Olympics
- Bermuda at the 2000 Summer Olympics
- Bermuda at the 2004 Summer Olympics
- Bermuda at the 2006 Commonwealth Games
- Bermuda at the 2006 Winter Olympics
- Bermuda Biological Station for Research
- Bermuda Botanical Gardens
- Bermuda Broadcasting
- Bermuda Fitted Dinghy
- Bermuda Football Association
- Bermuda High School for Girls
- Bermuda Industrial Union
- Bermuda International Airport
- Bermuda Islands
- Bermuda Militia 1612-1687
- Bermuda Militia 1687-1813
- Bermuda Militia 1813
- Bermuda Militia Artillery
- Bermuda Militias 1612-1815
- Bermuda Monetary Authority
- Bermuda national football team
- Bermuda National Stadium
- Bermuda National Trust
- Bermuda petrel
- Bermuda Police Service
- Bermuda Public Services Association
- Bermuda Railway
- Bermuda Regiment
- Bermuda rig
- Bermuda rock skink
- Bermuda Sea Cadet Corps
- Bermuda sloop
- Bermuda Stock Exchange
- Bermuda Triangle
- Bermuda Volunteer Rifle Corps
- Bermuda
- Bermudian architecture
- Bermudian dollar
- Bermudian English
- Bermudian pound
- Boaz Island, Bermuda
- Brian Wellman
- British Overseas Territory of the Bermuda Islands

== C ==
- Cahow
- Capital of Bermuda: Hamilton
- Caribbean Community (CARICOM)
- Castle Harbor, Bermuda
- Castle Island, Bermuda
- Categories:
  - Category:Bermuda
    - Category:Bermuda stubs
    - Category:Bermuda-related lists
    - Category:Bermudian people
    - Category:Buildings and structures in Bermuda
    - Category:Communications in Bermuda
    - Category:Culture of Bermuda
    - Category:Economy of Bermuda
    - Category:Education in Bermuda
    - Category:Environment of Bermuda
    - Category:Geography of Bermuda
    - Category:Government of Bermuda
    - Category:History of Bermuda
    - Category:Military of Bermuda
    - Category:Politics of Bermuda
    - Category:Science and technology in Bermuda
    - Category:Society of Bermuda
    - Category:Sport in Bermuda
    - Category:Transport in Bermuda
  - commons:Category:Bermuda
- The Causeway, Bermuda
- Charles Elliot

The Coat of arms of Bermuda

- Christopher Charles Luxmoore
- Church Bay, Bermuda
- Clarence Hill (boxer)
- Clay Smith (cricketer)
- Clyde Best
- Coat of arms of Bermuda
- Collie budz aka Colin Harper
- Common ground dove
- Commonwealth of Nations
- Communications in Bermuda
- Coney Island, Bermuda
- Cooper's Island, Bermuda
- Crystal Cave, Bermuda
- Culture of Bermuda

== D ==
- Dandy Town Hornets F.C.
- Daniel Morgan (cricketer)
- Darrell's Island, Bermuda
- David Bascome
- David Hemp
- Dean Minors
- Delyone Borden
- Demographics of Bermuda
- Dennis Archer (cricketer)
- Devil's Hole, Bermuda
- Devonshire Parish, Bermuda
- Dwayne Leverock

== E ==
- Eastern bluebird
- Economy of Bermuda
- Edward Harris (archaeologist)
- Elbow Beach, Bermuda
- Elections in Bermuda
- English colonization of the Americas
- English language
- Eric Joseph Trapp
- Ewen Ratteray
- Earle E. Seaton

== F ==
The Flag of Bermuda

- The Fairmont Hamilton Princess
- Fernance Perry
- Ferry Reach, Bermuda
- Flag of Bermuda
- Flatt's Inlet, Bermuda
- Flatts Village, Bermuda
- Flora and fauna in Bermuda
- Foreign relations of Bermuda
- Francis Patton

== G ==
- Geography of Bermuda
- George O'Brien (cricketer)
- George Somers
- Gibbs Hill Lighthouse
- Gina Swainson
- Glyn Gilbert
- Government House, Bermuda
- Governor of Bermuda
- Gray catbird
- Great kiskadee
- Great Sound, Bermuda
- Gunner Bay, Bermuda

== H ==
- Hail to Bermuda
- Hamilton–Capital of Bermuda
- Hamilton Harbor, Bermuda
- Hamilton Parish, Bermuda
- Harrington Sound, Bermuda
- Hasan Durham
- Hawkins Island, Bermuda
- Heather Nova
- Hinson's Island, Bermuda
- History of Bermuda
- HMS Bermuda
- Horseshoe Bay, Bermuda
- House of Assembly of Bermuda
- HSBC
- Hurricane Dean (1989)
- Hurricane Debby (1982)
- Hurricane Emily (1987)
- Hurricane Fabian
- Hurricane Felix (1995)
- Hurricane Florence (2006)
- Hurricane Karen (2001)

== I ==
- International Organization for Standardization (ISO)
  - ISO 3166-1 alpha-2 country code for Bermuda: BM
  - ISO 3166-1 alpha-3 country code for Bermuda: BMU
- Ireland Island, Bermuda
- Irving Romaine
- Islands of Bermuda

== J ==
- Janeiro Tucker
- Jennifer M. Smith
- John Armstrong
- John Arthur Jagoe
- John Barry Nusum
- John Swan
- Johnny Barnes
- Juniperus bermudiana
- Juniperus Capital

== K ==
- Kenneth Amis
- Kevin Hurdle
- Khano Smith
- Kiskadee
- Kwame Tucker
- Kyle Lightbourne

== L ==
- Law of Bermuda
- Lionel Cann
- Lists related to Bermuda:
  - Islands of Bermuda
  - List of Bermuda ODI cricketers
  - List of Bermuda Triangle incidents
  - List of Bermuda-related topics
  - List of Bermudian first-class cricketers
  - List of Bishops of Bermuda
  - List of cities in Bermuda
  - List of football clubs in Bermuda
  - List of mammals of Bermuda
  - List of NANP area codes
  - List of political parties in Bermuda
  - List of premiers of Bermuda
  - List of schools in Bermuda
  - List of television stations in Bermuda
  - Topic outline of Bermuda
- Little Sound, Bermuda
- Lois Browne-Evans
- London Company
- Long Island, Bermuda
- Longtail

== M ==
- Mangrove Lake, Bermuda
- Marshall's Island, Bermuda
- Mary Prince
- Michael Douglas
- Military of Bermuda
- Mourning dove
- MS Frontier Reinsurance

== N ==
- Naval Air Station Bermuda
- Nonsuch Island, Bermuda
- North America
- North Atlantic Ocean
- Northern America
- Northern cardinal
- Northern Hemisphere

== O ==
- Ordnance Island, Bermuda

== P ==
- Paget Island, Bermuda
- Paget Parish, Bermuda
- Parliament of Bermuda
- Pembroke Parish, Bermuda
- Peter Benchley
- Places of interest in Bermuda
- Politics of Bermuda
- Port Royal
- Progressive Labour Party (Bermuda)
- Public holidays in Bermuda

== R ==
- RNAS Boaz Island
- Rebecca Middleton
- Robert Wright Stopford
- Royal Air Force, Bermuda, 1939-1945
- Royal Naval Dockyard, Bermuda
- Ryan Steede

== S ==
- St. David's Head, Bermuda
- St. David's Island, Bermuda
- St. George's Harbor, Bermuda
- St. George's Island, Bermuda
- St. George's Parish, Bermuda
- St. George's, Bermuda
- Saleem Mukuddem
- Salt Kettle, Bermuda
- Saltus Grammar School
- Sandys Parish, Bermuda
- Sargasso Sea
- Scouting in Bermuda
- Sea Venture
- Senate of Bermuda
- Shaun Goater
- Sinky Bay
- Smith's Island, Bermuda
- Smith's Parish, Bermuda
- Somers Isles Company
- Somerset Bridge, Bermuda
- Somerset Island, Bermuda
- Somerset, Bermuda
- Southampton Parish, Bermuda
- Spanish Point, Bermuda
- Spittal Pond, Bermuda
- Steven Outerbridge
- Subdivisions of Bermuda

== T ==
- Thomas Gates (governor)
- Thomas Leslie Outerbridge
- Thomas Norman Nisbett
- Tim Hemp
- Tobacco Bay, Bermuda
- Topic outline of Bermuda
- Transport in Bermuda
- Treadwell Gibbons
- Trott's Pond, Bermuda
- Troy Douglas
- Trunk Island, Bermuda
- Tucker's Town Peninsula, Bermuda
- Tucker's Town, Bermuda
- Tudor Hill Laboratory
- Tyler Butterfield

== U ==
- United Bermuda Party
- United Kingdom of Great Britain and Northern Ireland
- USCG Air-Sea Rescue, at USAF Base, Kindley Field
- USCG Base, Whites Island, Bermuda. WWI
- USL Second Division
- USN NAS Bermuda, Kindley Field, 1970-1995
- USN NAS Bermuda/NAS Annex, Morgans Point, 1941-1995
- USN Submarine Base, Ordnance Island, Bermuda
- U.S. Naval Facility Bermuda

== V ==
- Victoria Park, Hamilton
- VSB-TV

== W ==
- Warwick Academy
- Warwick Parish, Bermuda
- White-eyed vireo
- White-tailed tropicbird
- Wikimedia Atlas of Bermuda
- Wikipedia:WikiProject Topic outline/Drafts/Topic outline of Bermuda
- William Alexander Scott
- William John Denbigh Down

== Y ==
- Yellow-crowned night heron

== Z ==
- ZBM-TV
- ZFB-TV

== See also ==
- List of international rankings
- Lists of country-related topics
- Topic outline of Bermuda
- Topic outline of geography
- Topic outline of North America
