= List of birds of Bermuda =

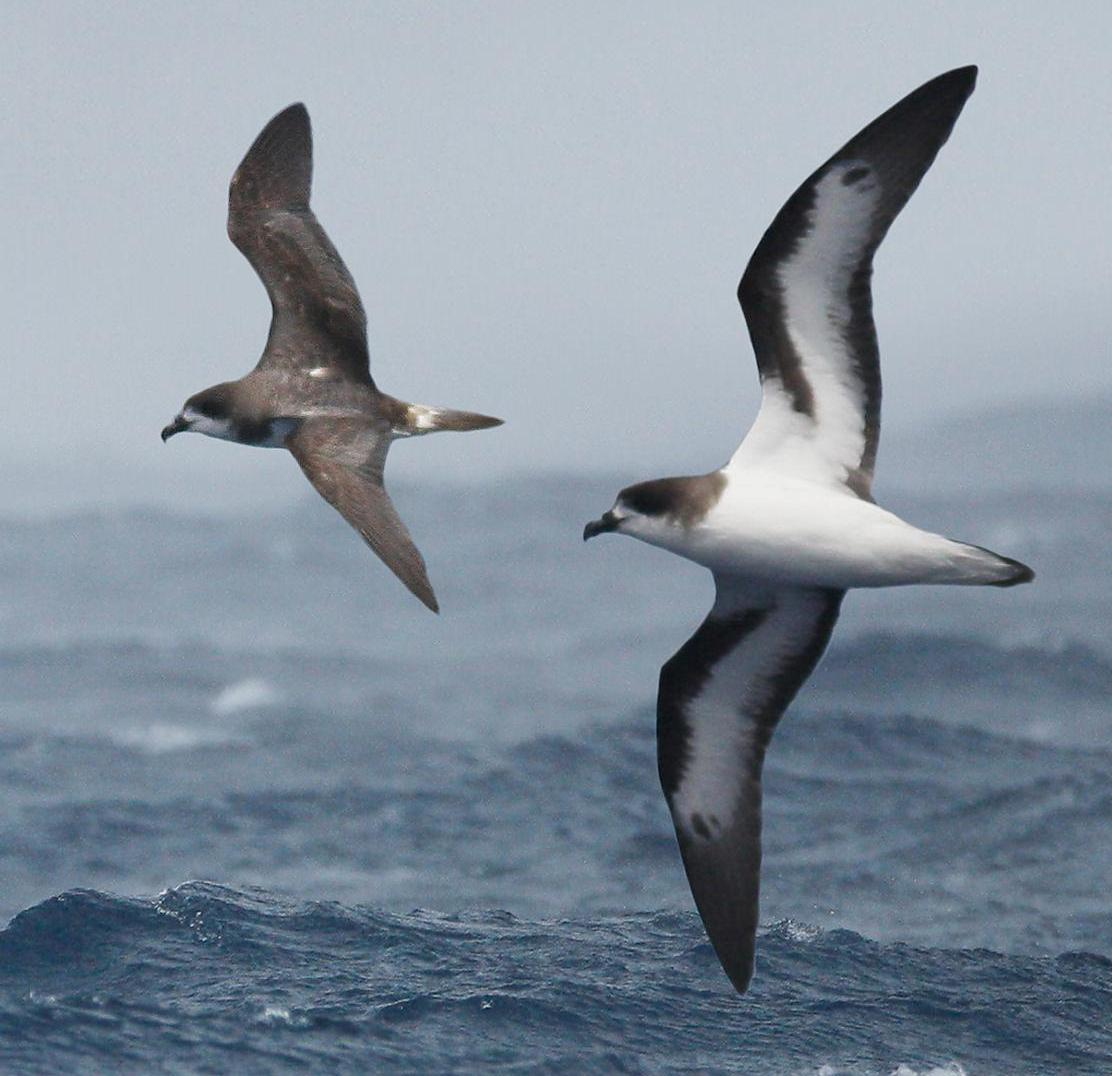
The Bermuda petrel is the national bird of Bermuda.

The avifauna of Bermuda include 408 species, according to the Bermuda Audubon Society (BAS), with some additions from Clements taxonomy, as of July 2022.

The 387 species is a remarkable number considering that the island is a mere 53.3 square kilometres. (Additional species known only from the fossil record or speculatively from the time of early exploration are not included.) Ten species were introduced by humans; the mallard also occurs naturally as a non-breeding migrant. Of the 408, 104 are uncommon, 61 are rare, and 152 are very rare, all as defined below. Sargasso shearwater formerly bred in Bermuda but is now only a vagrant; All endemic species are considered extinct; Eskimo curlew is considered extinct.

This list is presented in the taxonomic sequence of the Check-list of North and Middle American Birds, 7th edition through the 63rd Supplement, published by the American Ornithological Society (AOS). Common and scientific names are also those of the Check-list, except that the common names of families are from the Clements taxonomy because the AOS list does not include them.

Unless otherwise noted, all species listed below are considered to occur regularly in Bermuda as permanent residents, summer or winter visitors, or migrants. These tags are used to annotate some species:

- (U) Uncommon - a species "recorded in most years but in small numbers" per the BAS
- (R) Rare - a species "not recorded annually" per the BAS
- (VR) Very rare - a species with fewer than 15 records per the BAS
- (I) Introduced - a species present in Bermuda as a consequence, direct or indirect, of human actions
- (E) Endemic- a species endemic to Bermuda

== Ducks, geese, and waterfowl ==
Order: Anseriformes Family: Anatidae

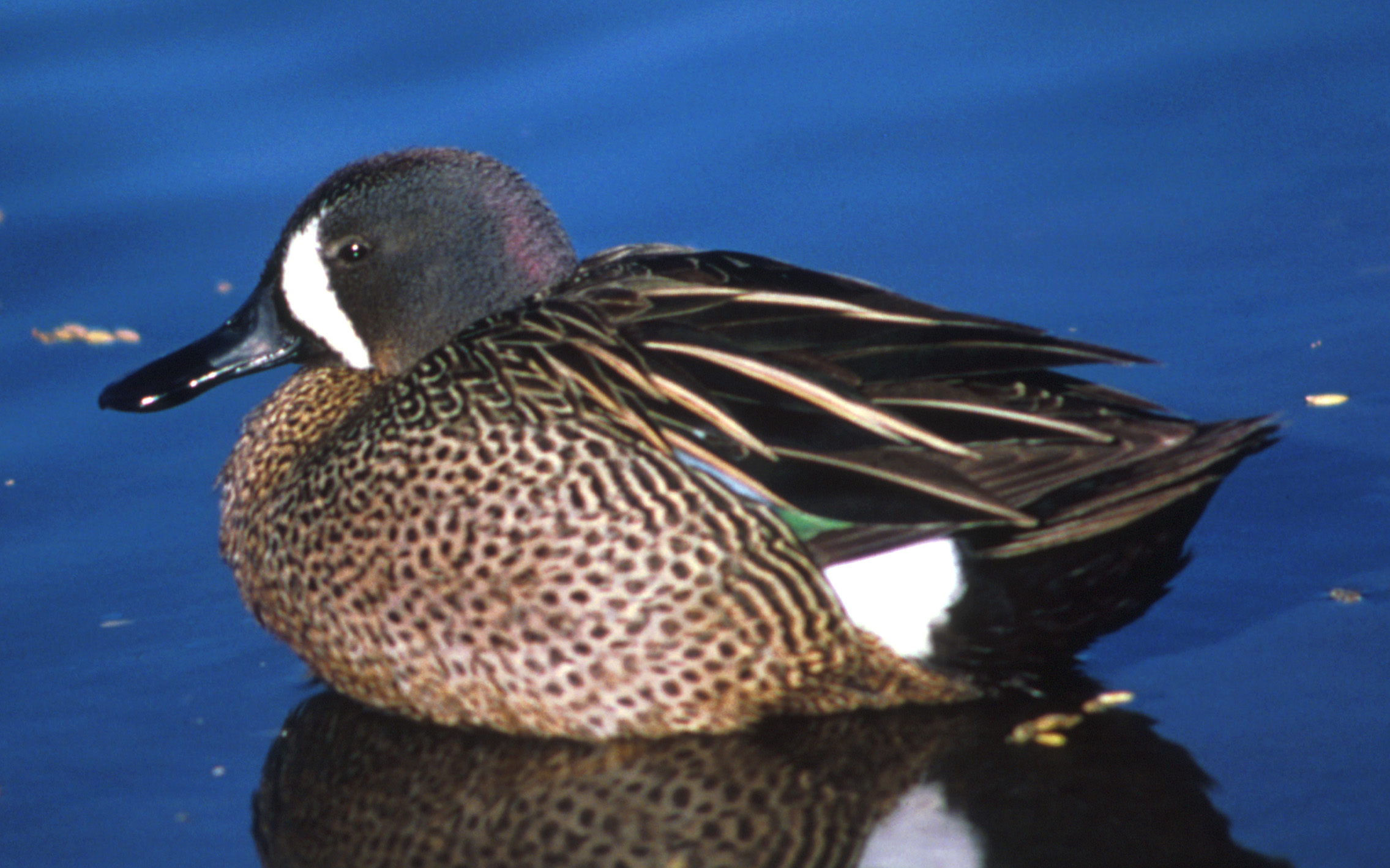
The blue-winged teal is the most common of the migrant ducks.

The family Anatidae includes the ducks and most duck-like waterfowl, such as geese and swans. These birds are adapted to an aquatic existence with webbed feet, flattened bills, and feathers that are excellent at shedding water due to an oily coating.

- Black-bellied whistling-duck, Dendrocygna autumnalis (VR)
- West Indian whistling-duck, Dendrocygna arborea (VR)
- Fulvous whistling-duck, Dendrocygna bicolor (VR)
- Snow goose, Anser caerulescens (U)
- Ross's goose, Anser rossii (VR)
- Greater white-fronted goose, Anser albifrons (VR)
- Brant, Branta bernicla (VR)
- Canada goose, Branta canadensis (U)
- Mute swan, Cygnus olor (VR)
- Tundra swan, Cygnus columbianus (VR)
- Wood duck, Aix sponsa (U)
- Garganey, Spatula querquedula (VR)
- Blue-winged teal, Spatula discors
- Northern shoveler, Spatula clypeata (U)
- Gadwall, Mareca strepera (U)
- Eurasian wigeon, Mareca penelope (U)
- American wigeon, Mareca americana (U)
- Mallard, Anas platyrhynchos (I)
- American black duck, Anas rubripes (U)
- Northern pintail, Anas acuta (U)
- Green-winged teal, Anas crecca
- Canvasback, Aythya valisineria (VR)
- Redhead, Aythya americana (VR)
- Ring-necked duck, Aythya collaris
- Ferruginous duck, Aythya nyroca (VR) (Not on the AOS Check-list)
- Tufted duck, Aythya fuligula (VR)
- Greater scaup, Aythya marila (R)
- Lesser scaup, Aythya affinis (U)
- Common eider, Somateria mollissima (VR)
- Surf scoter, Melanitta perspicillata (VR)
- White-winged scoter, Melanitta deglandi (VR)
- Black scoter, Melanitta americana (VR)
- Long-tailed duck, Clangula hyemalis (R)
- Bufflehead, Bucephala albeola (U)
- Common goldeneye, Bucephala clangula (R)
- Hooded merganser, Lophodytes cucullatus
- Common merganser, Mergus merganser (U)
- Red-breasted merganser, Mergus serrator (U)
- Ruddy duck, Oxyura jamaicensis (U)

== Flamingos ==
Order: Phoenicopteriformes Family: Phoenicopteridae

Flamingos are gregarious wading birds, usually 3 to 5 feet (0.9 to 1.5 m) tall, found in both the Western and Eastern Hemispheres. Flamingos filter-feed on shellfish and algae. Their oddly shaped beaks are specially adapted to separate mud and silt from the food they consume and, uniquely, are used upside-down.

Flamingos do not occur in the wild in, and are not native to, Bermuda, and have neither colonised Bermuda nor been introduced to the wild there. The Bermuda Aquarium, Museum and Zoo has exhibited a small number on public display since 1954. These birds have been used for a captive breeding programme (the first to hatch in the zoo was in 1967) for re-introduction to the wild in the British Virgin Islands in 1992. Although their open-air enclosure is too small for them to become airborne, one flamingo escaped captivity in 1987, being driven aloft by Hurricane Emily. The bird survived the storm and was recaptured. Another escaped in 2003 and was recaptured the following year.

- American flamingo, Phoenicopterus ruber (VR)

== Grebes ==
Order: Podicipediformes Family: Podicipedidae

Grebes are small to medium-large freshwater diving birds. They have lobed toes and are excellent swimmers and divers. However, they have their feet placed far back on the body, making them quite ungainly on land.

- Pied-billed grebe, Podilymbus podiceps
- Horned grebe, Podiceps auritus (R)
- Red-necked grebe, Podiceps grisegena (VR)
- Eared grebe, Podiceps nigricollis (VR)

== Pigeons and doves ==
Order: Columbiformes Family: Columbidae

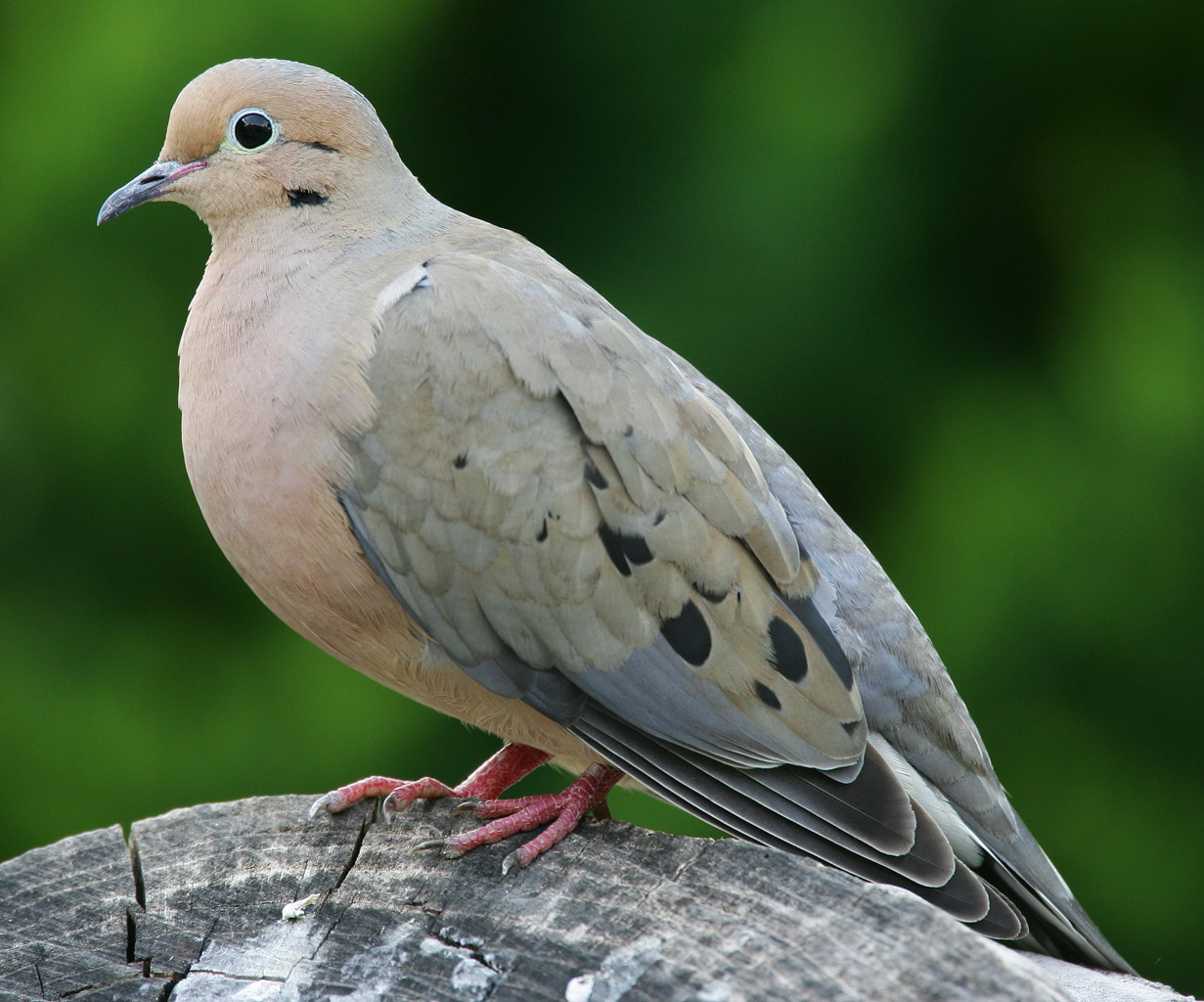
The mourning dove first bred in Bermuda in the 1950s and is now common.

Pigeons and doves are stout-bodied birds with short necks and short slender bills with a fleshy cere.

- Rock pigeon, Columba livia (I)
- Passenger pigeon, Ectopistes migratorius (VR) (extinct)
- Eurasian collared-dove, Streptopelia decaocto (VR)
- African collared-dove, Streptopelia roseogrisea (VR)
- Common ground dove, Columbina passerina
- White-winged dove, Zenaida asiatica (VR)
- Mourning dove, Zenaida macroura

== Cuckoos ==
Order: Cuculiformes Family: Cuculidae

The family Cuculidae includes cuckoos, roadrunners, and anis. These birds are of variable size with slender bodies, long tails, and strong legs. The Old World cuckoos are brood parasites.

- Yellow-billed cuckoo, Coccyzus americanus
- Black-billed cuckoo, Coccyzus erythropthalmus (U)

== Nightjars and allies ==
Order: Caprimulgiformes Family: Caprimulgidae

Nightjars are medium-sized nocturnal birds that usually nest on the ground. They have long wings, short legs, and very short bills. Most have small feet, of little use for walking, and long pointed wings. Their soft plumage is camouflaged to resemble bark or leaves.

- Lesser nighthawk, Chordeiles acutipennis (VR)
- Common nighthawk, Chordeiles minor (U)
- Antillean nighthawk, Chordeiles gundlachii (VR)
- Eastern whip-poor-will, Antrostomus vociferus (VR)

== Swifts ==
Order: Apodiformes Family: Apodidae

Swifts are small birds which spend the majority of their lives flying. These birds have very short legs and never settle voluntarily on the ground, perching instead only on vertical surfaces. Many swifts have long swept-back wings which resemble a crescent or boomerang.

- Black swift, Cypseloides niger (VR)
- Chimney swift, Chaetura pelagica (U)
- Alpine swift, Apus melba (VR)
- Common swift, Apus apus (VR)

== Hummingbirds ==
Order: Apodiformes Family: Trochilidae

Hummingbirds are small birds capable of hovering in mid-air due to the rapid flapping of their wings. They are the only birds that can fly backwards.

- Ruby-throated hummingbird, Archilochus colubris (R)

== Rails, gallinules, and coots ==
Order: Gruiformes Family: Rallidae

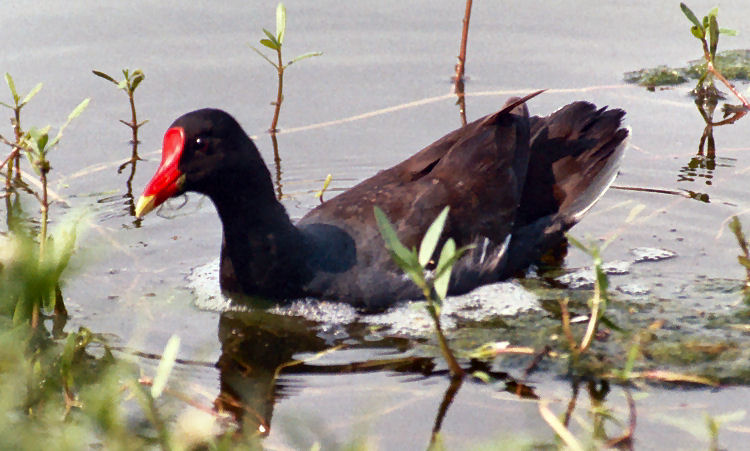
The common gallinule breeds on most ponds.

Rallidae is a large family of small to medium-sized birds which includes the rails, crakes, coots, and gallinules. Typically they inhabit dense vegetation in damp environments near lakes, swamps, or rivers. In general they are shy and secretive birds, making them difficult to observe. Most species have strong legs and long toes which are well adapted to soft uneven surfaces. They tend to have short, rounded wings and to be weak fliers.

- Clapper rail, Rallus crepitans (VR)
- Virginia rail, Rallus limicola (U)
- Corn crake, Crex crex (VR)
- Sora, Porzana carolina (U)
- Common gallinule, Gallinula galeata
- American coot, Fulica americana
- African swamphen, Porphyrio madagascariensis (VR)
- Gray-headed swamphen, Porphyrio poliocephalus (VR)
- Purple gallinule, Porphyrio martinicus (U)
- Yellow rail, Coturnicops noveboracensis (VR)
- Black rail, Laterallus jamaicensis (VR)

== Cranes ==
Order: Gruiformes Family: Gruidae

Cranes are large, long-legged, and long-necked birds. Unlike the similar-looking but unrelated herons, cranes fly with necks outstretched, not pulled back. Most have elaborate and noisy courting displays or "dances".

- Sandhill crane, Antigone canadensis (VR)

== Stilts and avocets ==
Order: Charadriiformes Family: Recurvirostridae

Recurvirostridae is a family of large wading birds which includes the avocets and stilts. The avocets have long legs and long up-curved bills. The stilts have extremely long legs and long, thin, straight bills.

- Black-necked stilt, Himantopus mexicanus (R)
- American avocet, Recurvirostra americana (R)

== Plovers and lapwings ==
Order: Charadriiformes Family: Charadriidae

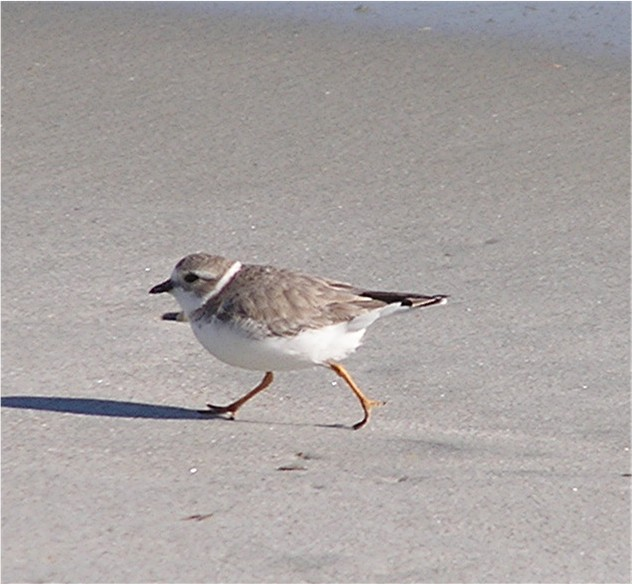
Threatened in much of its range, the piping plover has become uncommon in Bermuda.

The family Charadriidae includes the plovers, dotterels, and lapwings. They are small to medium-sized birds with compact bodies, short thick necks, and long, usually pointed, wings. They are found in open country worldwide, mostly in habitats near water.

- Northern lapwing, Vanellus vanellus (VR)
- Black-bellied plover, Pluvialis squatarola
- European golden-plover, Pluvialis apricaria (VR)
- American golden-plover, Pluvialis dominica
- Pacific golden-plover, Pluvialis fulva (VR)
- Eurasian dotterel, Charadrius morinellus (VR)
- Killdeer, Charadrius vociferus
- Semipalmated plover, Charadrius semipalmatus
- Piping plover, Charadrius melodus (U)
- Wilson's plover, Charadrius wilsonia (VR)

== Sandpipers and allies ==
Order: Charadriiformes Family: Scolopacidae

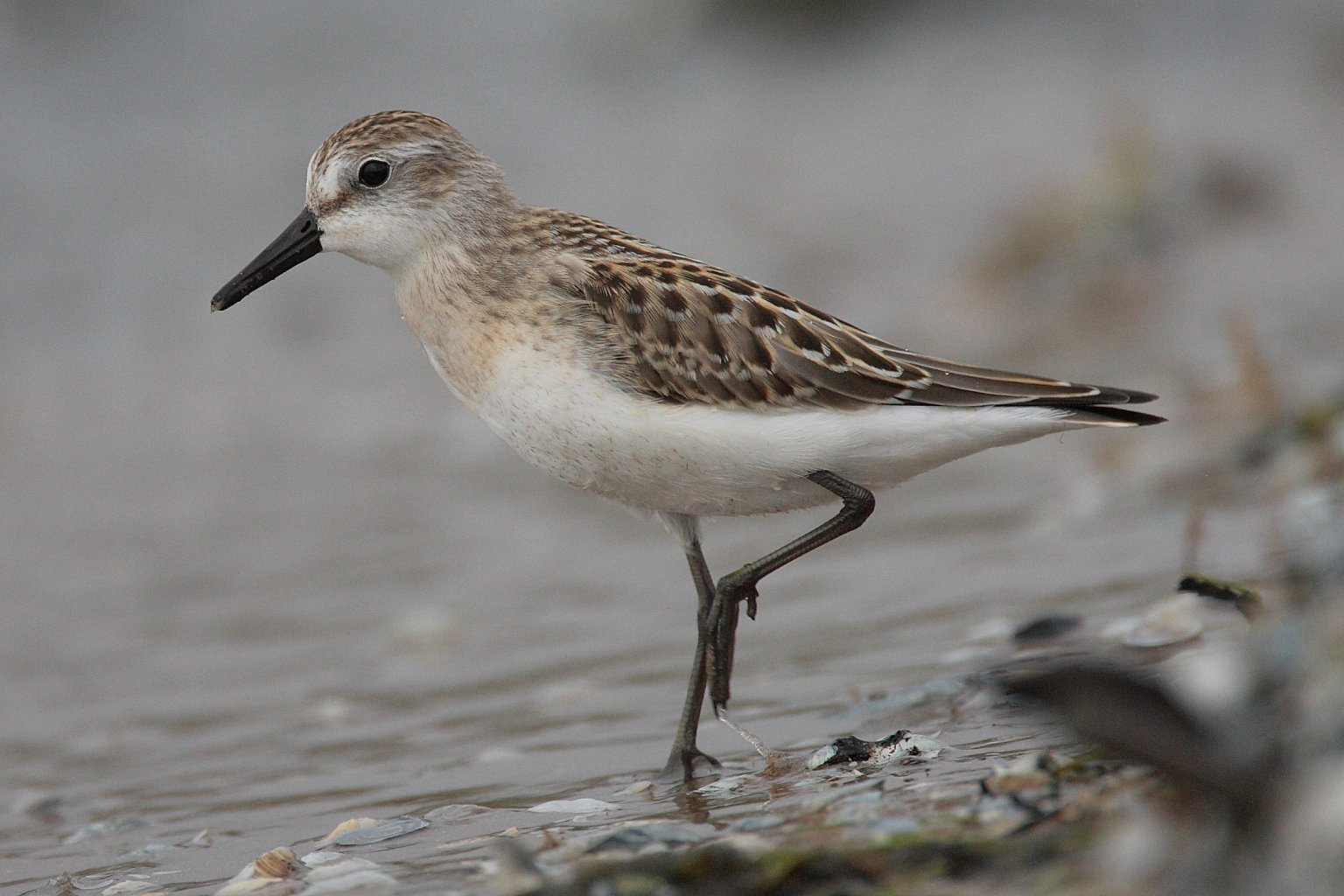
Semipalmated sandpiper - one of the most common migrant shorebirds.

Scolopacidae is a large diverse family of small to medium-sized shorebirds including the sandpipers, curlews, godwits, shanks, tattlers, woodcocks, snipes, dowitchers, and phalaropes. The majority of these species eat small invertebrates picked out of the mud or soil. Variation in length of legs and bills enables multiple species to feed in the same habitat, particularly on the coast, without direct competition for food.

- Upland sandpiper, Bartramia longicauda (U)
- Whimbrel, Numenius phaeopus (U)
- Eskimo curlew, Numenius borealis (Extinct)
- Eurasian curlew, Numenius arquata (VR)
- Bar-tailed godwit, Limosa lapponica (VR)
- Hudsonian godwit, Limosa haemastica (VR)
- Ruddy turnstone, Arenaria interpres
- Red knot, Calidris canutus (U)
- Ruff, Calidris pugnax (R)
- Sharp-tailed sandpiper, Calidris acuminata (VR)
- Stilt sandpiper, Calidris himantopus
- Curlew sandpiper, Calidris ferruginea (VR)
- Red-necked stint, Calidris ruficollis (VR)
- Sanderling, Calidris alba
- Dunlin, Calidris alpina (U)
- Purple sandpiper, Calidris maritima (VR)
- Baird's sandpiper, Calidris bairdii (R)
- Little stint, Calidris minuta (VR)
- Least sandpiper, Calidris minutilla
- White-rumped sandpiper, Calidris fuscicollis
- Buff-breasted sandpiper, Calidris subruficollis (U)
- Pectoral sandpiper, Calidris melanotos
- Semipalmated sandpiper, Calidris pusilla
- Western sandpiper, Calidris mauri (U)
- Short-billed dowitcher, Limnodromus griseus
- Long-billed dowitcher, Limnodromus scolopaceus (R)
- American woodcock, Scolopax minor (VR)
- Common snipe Gallinago gallinago (VR)
- Wilson's snipe, Gallinago delicata
- Spotted sandpiper, Actitis macularia (U)
- Solitary sandpiper, Tringa solitaria
- Lesser yellowlegs, Tringa flavipes
- Willet, Tringa semipalmata (U)
- Common greenshank, Tringa nebularia (VR)
- Greater yellowlegs, Tringa melanoleuca
- Wood sandpiper, Tringa glareola (VR)
- Wilson's phalarope, Phalaropus tricolor (R)
- Red-necked phalarope, Phalaropus lobatus (VR)
- Red phalarope, Phalaropus fulicarius (VR)

== Skuas and jaegers ==
Order: Charadriiformes Family: Stercorariidae

The family Stercorariidae are, in general, medium to large birds, typically with grey or brown plumage, often with white markings on the wings. They nest on the ground in temperate and arctic regions and are long-distance migrants.

- Great skua, Stercorarius skua (R)
- South polar skua, Stercorarius maccormicki (R)
- Brown skua, Stercorarius antarcticus (VR)
- Pomarine jaeger, Stercorarius pomarinus (U)
- Parasitic jaeger, Stercorarius parasiticus (U)
- Long-tailed jaeger, Stercorarius longicaudus (U)

== Auks, murres, and puffins ==
Order: Charadriiformes Family: Alcidae

Alcids are superficially similar to penguins due to their black-and-white colours, their upright posture, and some of their habits, however they are not related to the penguins and differ in being able to fly. Auks live on the open sea, only deliberately coming ashore to nest.

- Dovekie, Alle alle (VR)
- Razorbill, Alca torda (VR)
- Atlantic puffin, Fratercula arctica (VR)

== Gulls, terns, and skimmers ==
Order: Charadriiformes Family: Laridae

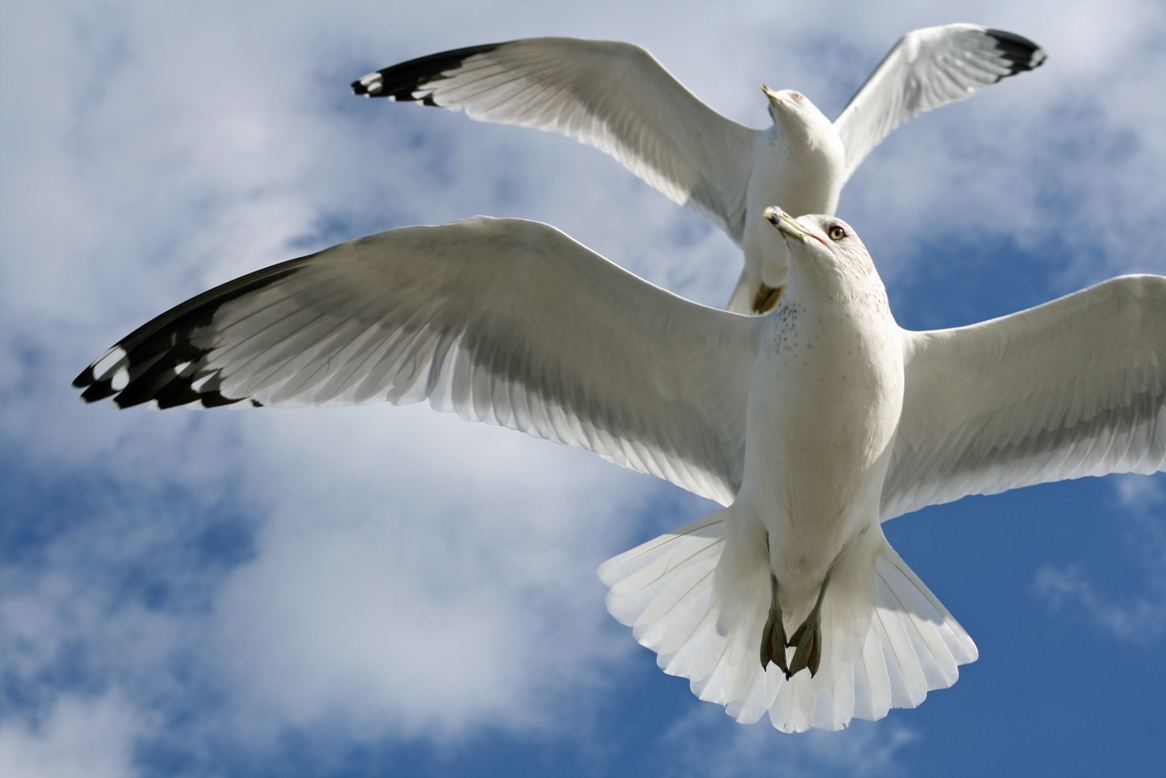
Ring-billed gulls - common along the coast in winter.

Laridae is a family of medium to large seabirds and includes gulls, terns, and skimmers. Gulls are typically grey or white, often with black markings on the head or wings. They have webbed feet. Gulls have stout bills while terns have long dagger-like bils. Terns are a group of generally medium to large seabirds typically with grey or white plumage, often with black markings on the head. Most terns hunt fish by diving but some pick insects off the surface of fresh water. Terns are generally long-lived birds, with several species known to live in excess of 30 years. Skimmers are a small family of tropical tern-like birds. They have an elongated lower mandible which they use to feed by flying low over the water surface and skimming the water for small fish.

- Black-legged kittiwake, Rissa tridactyla (R)
- Sabine's gull, Xema sabini (VR)
- Bonaparte's gull, Chroicocephalus philadelphia (U)
- Black-headed gull, Chroicocephalus ridibundus (R)
- Little gull, Hydrocoloeus minutus (VR)
- Laughing gull, Leucophaeus atricilla (U)
- Franklin's gull, Leucophaeus pipixcan (VR)
- Black-tailed gull, Larus crassirostris (VR)
- Ring-billed gull, Larus delawarensis
- California gull, Larus californicus (VR)
- Herring gull, Larus argentatus
- Iceland gull, Larus glaucoides (R)
- Lesser black-backed gull, Larus fuscus
- Glaucous gull, Larus hyperboreus (R)
- Great black-backed gull, Larus marinus (U)
- Brown noddy, Anous stolidus (VR)
- White tern, Gygis alba (VR)
- Sooty tern, Onychoprion fuscatus (R)
- Bridled tern, Onychoprion anaethetus (R)
- Least tern, Sternula antillarum (U)
- Large-billed tern, Phaetusa simplex (VR)
- Gull-billed tern, Gelochelidon nilotica (R)
- Caspian tern, Hydroprogne caspia (VR)
- Black tern, Chlidonias niger (R)
- White-winged tern, Chlidonias leucopterus (C)
- Roseate tern, Sterna dougallii (R)
- Common tern, Sterna hirundo
- Arctic tern, Sterna paradisaea (U)
- Forster's tern, Sterna forsteri (U)
- Royal tern, Thalasseus maximus (U)
- Sandwich tern, Thalasseus sandvicensis (U)
- Black skimmer, Rynchops niger (VR)

== Tropicbirds ==
Order: Phaethontiformes Family: Phaethontidae

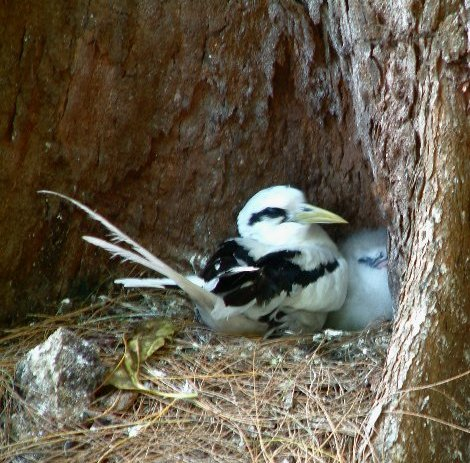
The white-tailed tropicbird or "longtail" arrives in spring to breed.

Tropicbirds are slender white birds of tropical oceans with exceptionally long central tail feathers. Their heads and long wings have black markings.

- White-tailed tropicbird, Phaethon lepturus
- Red-billed tropicbird, Phaethon aethereus (VR)

== Loons ==
Order: Gaviiformes Family: Gaviidae

Loons, known as divers in Europe, are a group of aquatic birds found in many parts of North America and northern Europe. They are the size of a large duck or small goose, which they somewhat resemble when swimming, but to which they are completely unrelated.

- Pacific loon, Gavia pacifica (VR)
- Common loon, Gavia immer (VR)

== Albatrosses ==
Order: Procellariiformes Family: Diomedeidae

The albatrosses are amongst the largest of flying birds, and the great albatrosses from the genus Diomedea have the largest wingspans of any extant birds.

- Black-browed albatross, Thalassarche melanophris (VR)

== Southern storm-petrels ==
Order: Procellariiformes Family: Oceanitidae

The storm-petrels are the smallest seabirds, relatives of the petrels, feeding on planktonic crustaceans and small fish picked from the surface, typically while hovering. The flight is fluttering and sometimes bat-like. Until 2018, this family's species were included with the other storm-petrels in family Hydrobatidae.

- Wilson's storm-petrel, Oceanites oceanicus

== Northern storm-petrels ==
Order: Procellariiformes Family: Hydrobatidae

Though the members of this family are similar in many respects to the southern storm-petrels, including their general appearance and habits, there are enough genetic differences to warrant their placement in a separate family.

- Leach's storm-petrel, Hydrobates leucorhous
- Band-rumped storm-petrel, Hydrobates castro (VR)

== Petrels and shearwaters ==
Order: Procellariiformes Family: Procellariidae

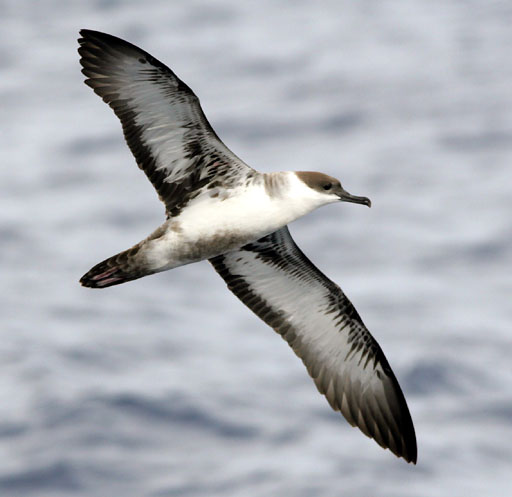
Large numbers of great shearwaters pass offshore between May and July.

The procellariids are the main group of medium-sized "true petrels", characterised by united nostrils with medium septum and a long outer functional primary.

- Northern fulmar, Fulmarus glacialis (VR)
- Trindade petrel, Pterodroma arminjoniana (VR)
- Bermuda petrel, Pterodroma cahow
- Black-capped petrel, Pterodroma hasitata (VR)
- Cory's shearwater, Calonectris diomedea
- Great shearwater, Ardenna gravis
- Sooty shearwater, Ardenna griseus
- Manx shearwater, Puffinus puffinus
- Sargasso shearwater, Puffinus lherminieri (Extirpated as a breeder) (VR)

== Frigatebirds ==
Order: Suliformes Family: Fregatidae

Frigatebirds are large seabirds usually found over tropical oceans. They are large, black-and-white, or completely black, with long wings and deeply forked tails. The males have coloured inflatable throat pouches. They do not swim or walk and cannot take off from a flat surface. Having the largest wingspan-to-body-weight ratio of any bird, they are essentially aerial, able to stay aloft for more than a week.

- Magnificent frigatebird, Fregata magnificens (R)

== Boobies and gannets ==
Order: Suliformes Family: Sulidae

The sulids comprise the gannets and boobies. Both groups are medium to large coastal seabirds that plunge-dive for fish.

- Masked booby, Sula dactylatra (R)
- Brown booby, Sula leucogaster (R)
- Northern gannet, Morus bassanus (R)

== Cormorants and shags ==
Order: Suliformes Family: Phalacrocoracidae

Phalacrocoracidae is a family of medium to large coastal, fish-eating seabirds that includes cormorants and shags. Plumage colouration varies, with the majority having mainly dark plumage, some species being black-and-white, and a few being colourful.

- Great cormorant, Phalacrocorax carbo (R)
- Double-crested cormorant, Nannopterum auritum

== Pelicans ==
Order: Pelecaniformes Family: Pelecanidae

Pelicans are large water birds with a distinctive pouch under their beak. As with other members of the order Pelecaniformes, they have webbed feet with four toes.

- American white pelican, Pelecanus erythrorhynchos (VR)
- Brown pelican, Pelecanus occidentalis (R)

== Herons, egrets, and bitterns ==
Order: Pelecaniformes Family: Ardeidae

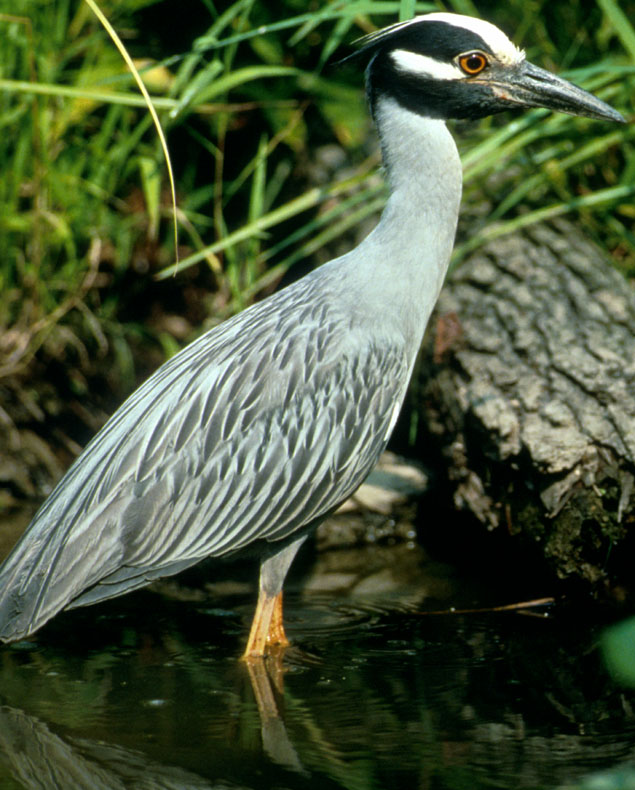
Yellow-crowned night-herons were released between 1976 and 1978 in order to re-establish heron colonies on Bermuda.

The family Ardeidae contains the bitterns, herons, and egrets. Herons and egrets are medium to large wading birds with long necks and legs. Bitterns tend to be shorter necked and more wary. Members of Ardeidae fly with their necks retracted, unlike other long-necked birds such as storks, ibises, and spoonbills.

- American bittern, Botaurus lentiginosus (U)
- Least bittern, Ixobrychus exilis (U)
- Great blue heron, Ardea herodias
- Gray heron, Ardea cinerea (VR)
- Great egret, Ardea alba
- Little egret, Egretta garzetta (VR)
- Snowy egret, Egretta thula
- Little blue heron, Egretta caerulea (U)
- Tricolored heron, Egretta tricolor (U)
- Reddish egret, Egretta rufescens (VR)
- Cattle egret, Bubulcus ibis
- Green heron, Butorides virescens
- Striated heron, Butorides striata (VR)
- Black-crowned night-heron, Nycticorax nycticorax (R)
- Yellow-crowned night-heron, Nyctanassa violacea
- Bermuda night-heron, Nyctanassa carcinocatactes (E) (extinct)

== Ibises ==
Order: Pelecaniformes Family: Threskiornithidae

Threskiornithidae is a family of large terrestrial and wading birds which includes the ibises and spoonbills. They have long, broad wings with 11 primary and about 20 secondary feathers. They are strong fliers and despite their size and weight, very capable soarers.

- White ibis, Eudocimus albus (VR)
- Glossy ibis, Plegadis falcinellus (U)

== New World vultures ==
Order: Cathartiformes Family: Cathartidae

The New World vultures are not closely related to Old World vultures, but superficially resemble them because of convergent evolution. Like the Old World vultures, they are scavengers. However, unlike Old World vultures, which find carcasses by sight, New World vultures have a good sense of smell with which they locate carrion.

- Turkey vulture, Cathartes aura (VR)

== Osprey ==
Order: Accipitriformes Family: Pandionidae

Pandionidae is a monotypic family of fish-eating birds of prey. Its single species possesses a very large and powerful hooked beak, strong legs, strong talons, and keen eyesight.

- Osprey, Pandion haliaetus (U)

== Hawks, eagles, and kites ==
Order: Accipitriformes Family: Accipitridae

Accipitridae is a family of birds of prey, which includes hawks, eagles, kites, harriers, and Old World vultures. These birds have powerful hooked beaks for tearing flesh from their prey, strong legs, powerful talons, and keen eyesight.

- Swallow-tailed kite, Elanoides forficatus (U)
- Booted eagle, Hieraaetus pennatus (VR) (Not on the AOS Check-list)
- Eurasian marsh-harrier, Circus aeruginosus (VR)
- Northern harrier, Circus hudsonius (U)
- Sharp-shinned hawk, Accipiter striatus (U)
- Cooper's hawk, Accipiter cooperii (VR)
- Northern goshawk, Accipiter gentilis (VR)
- Bald eagle, Haliaeetus leucocephalus (VR)
- Bermuda hawk, Bermuteo avivorus (E) (extinct)
- Mississippi kite, Ictinia mississippiensis (VR)
- Red-tailed hawk, Buteo jamaicensis (U)
- Rough-legged hawk, Buteo lagopus (VR)

== Barn-owls ==
Order: Strigiformes Family: Tytonidae

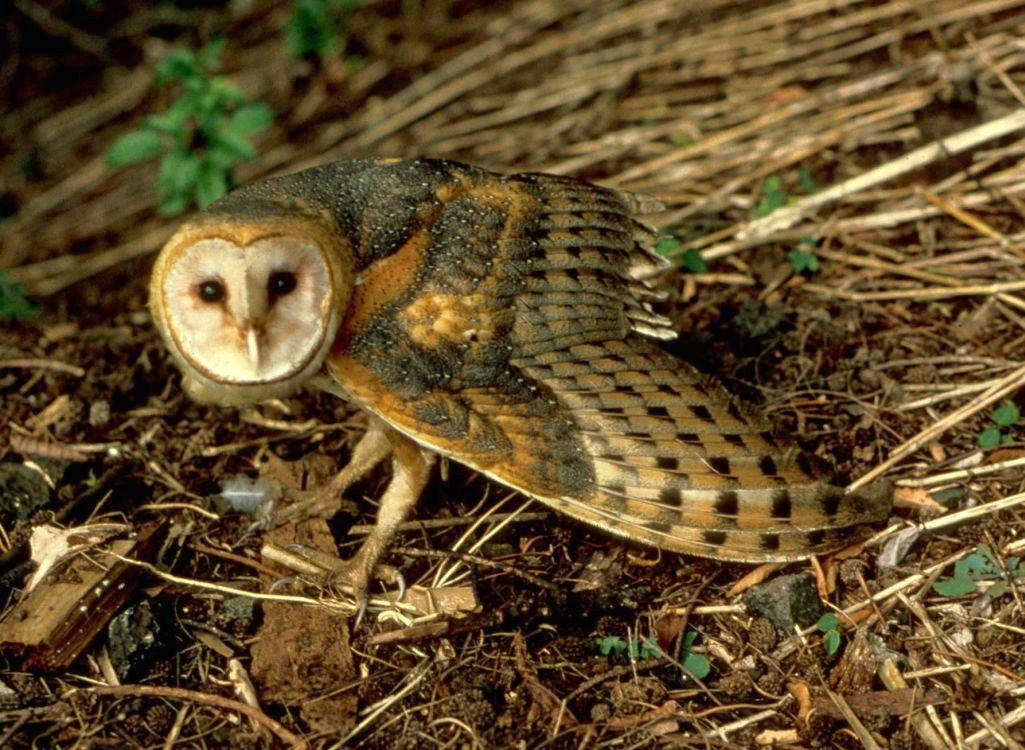
The barn owl colonized Bermuda in the 1930s.

Barn-owls are medium to large owls with large heads and characteristic heart-shaped faces. They have long strong legs with powerful talons.

- American barn owl, Tyto furcata

== Owls ==
Order: Strigiformes Family: Strigidae

The typical owls are small to large solitary nocturnal birds of prey. They have large forward-facing eyes and ears, a hawk-like beak, and a conspicuous circle of feathers around each eye called a facial disk.

- Eastern screech-owl, Megascops asio (VR)
- Great horned owl, Bubo virginianus (VR)
- Snowy owl, Bubo scandiacus (VR)
- Northern hawk owl, Surnia ulula (VR)
- Barred owl, Strix varia (VR)
- Long-eared owl, Asio otus (VR)
- Short-eared owl, Asio flammeus (R)
- Northern saw-whet owl, Aegolius acadicus (VR)
- Bermuda saw-whet owl, Aegolius gradyi (E) (extinct)

== Kingfishers ==
Order: Coraciiformes Family: Alcedinidae

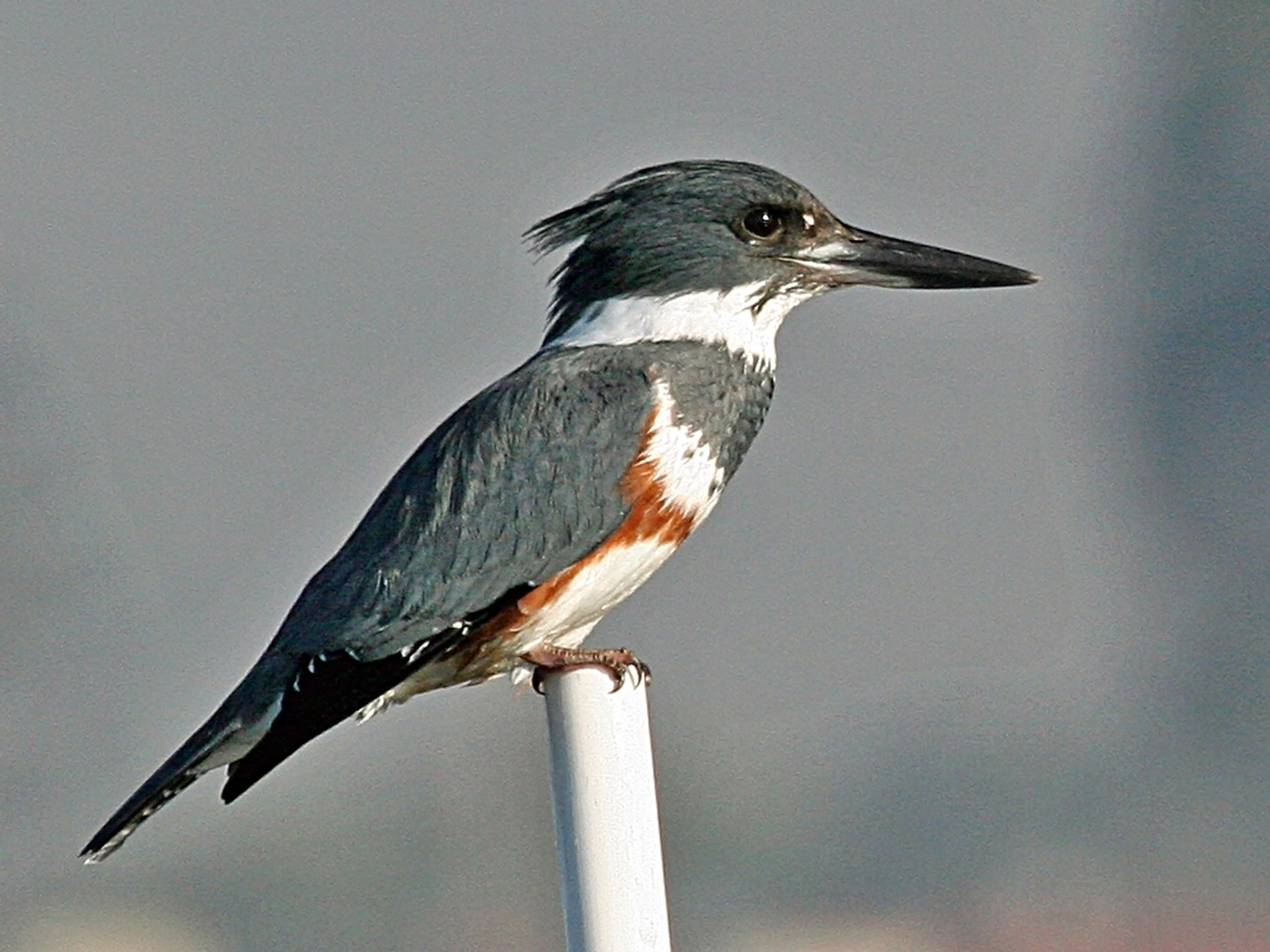
Belted kingfisher - a regular migrant to ponds and coasts.

Kingfishers are medium-sized birds with large heads, long pointed bills, short legs, and stubby tails.

- Belted kingfisher, Megaceryle alcyon

== Woodpeckers ==
Order: Piciformes Family: Picidae

Woodpeckers are small to medium-sized birds with chisel-like beaks, short legs, stiff tails, and long tongues used for capturing insects. Some species have feet with two toes pointing forward and two backward, while several species have only three toes. Many woodpeckers have the habit of tapping noisily on tree trunks with their beaks.

- Red-headed woodpecker, Melanerpes erythrocephalus (VR)
- Yellow-bellied sapsucker, Sphyrapicus varius (U)
- Downy woodpecker, Dryobates pubescens (VR)
- Hairy woodpecker, Dryobates villosus (VR)
- Northern flicker, Colaptes auratus (R)
- Bermuda flicker, Colaptes oceanicus (E) (extinct)

== Falcons and caracaras ==
Order: Falconiformes Family: Falconidae

Falconidae is a family of diurnal birds of prey. They differ from hawks, eagles, and kites in that they kill with their beaks instead of their talons.

- Eurasian kestrel, Falco tinnunculus (VR)
- American kestrel, Falco sparverius (U)
- Merlin, Falco columbarius (U)
- Gyrfalcon, Falco rusticolus (VR)
- Peregrine falcon, Falco peregrinus (U)

== Tyrant flycatchers ==
Order: Passeriformes Family: Tyrannidae

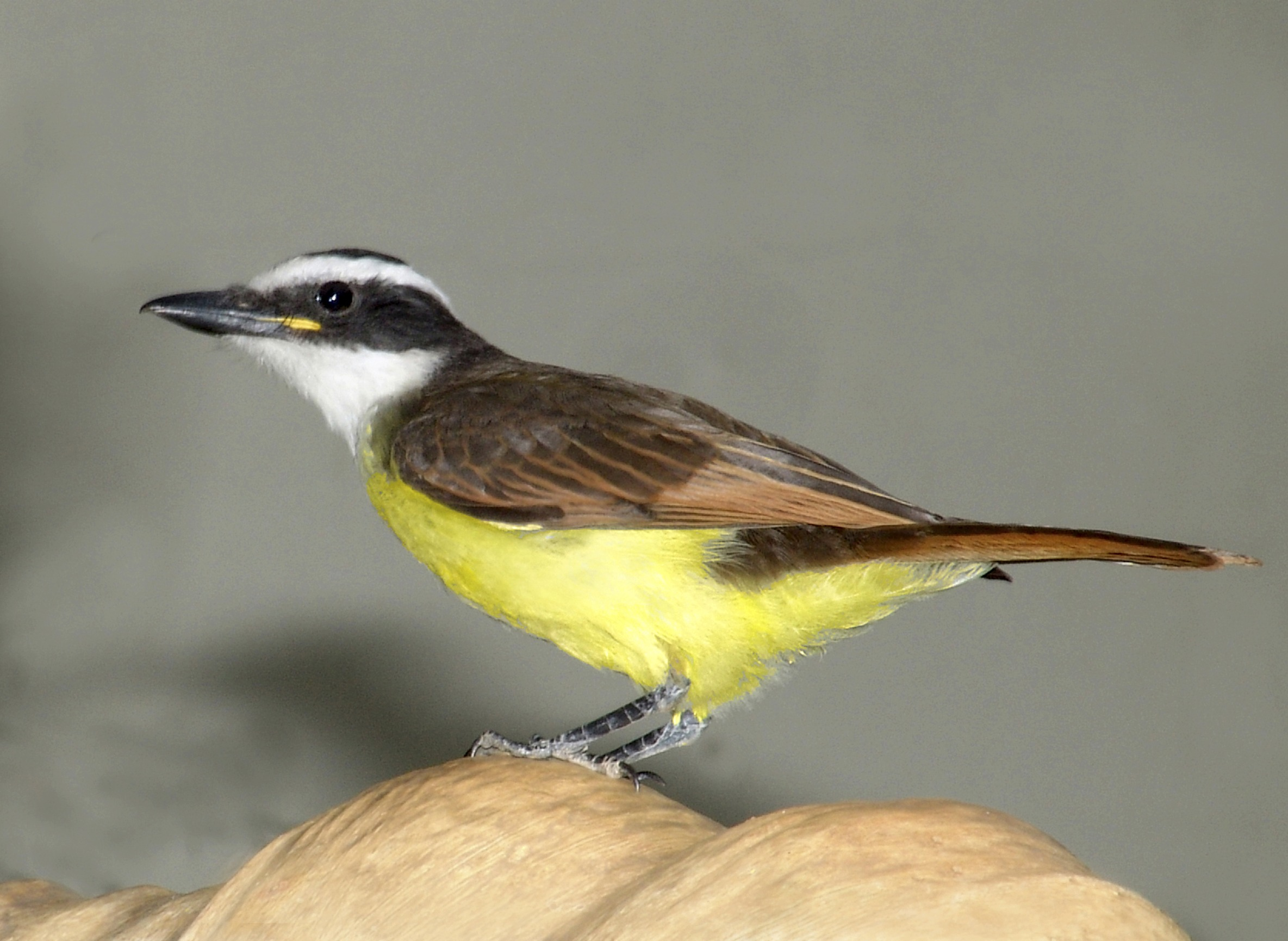
Great kiskadee - introduced from Trinidad in 1951 in an unsuccessful attempt to control anole lizards.

Tyrant flycatchers are passerine birds which occur throughout North and South America. They superficially resemble the Old World flycatchers, but are more robust and have stronger bills. They do not have the sophisticated vocal capabilities of the songbirds. Most, but not all, have plain colouring. As the name implies, most are insectivorous.

- Ash-throated flycatcher, Myiarchus cinerascens (VR)
- Great crested flycatcher, Myiarchus crinitus (R)
- Great kiskadee, Pitangus sulphuratus (I)
- Tropical kingbird, Tyrannus melancholicus (VR)
- Western kingbird, Tyrannus verticalis (R)
- Eastern kingbird, Tyrannus tyrannus (U)
- Gray kingbird, Tyrannus dominicensis (R)
- Scissor-tailed flycatcher, Tyrannus forficatus (VR)
- Fork-tailed flycatcher, Tyrannus savana (VR)
- Olive-sided flycatcher, Contopus cooperi (VR)
- Eastern wood-pewee, Contopus virens (U)
- Yellow-bellied flycatcher, Empidonax flaviventris (R)
- Acadian flycatcher, Empidonax virescens (R)
- Alder flycatcher, Empidonax alnorum (U)
- Willow flycatcher, Empidonax traillii (U)
- Least flycatcher, Empidonax minimus (U)
- Hammond's flycatcher, Empidonax hammondii (VR)
- Eastern phoebe, Sayornis phoebe (U)
- Say's phoebe, Sayornis saya (VR)

== Vireos, shrike-babblers, and erpornis ==
Order: Passeriformes Family: Vireonidae

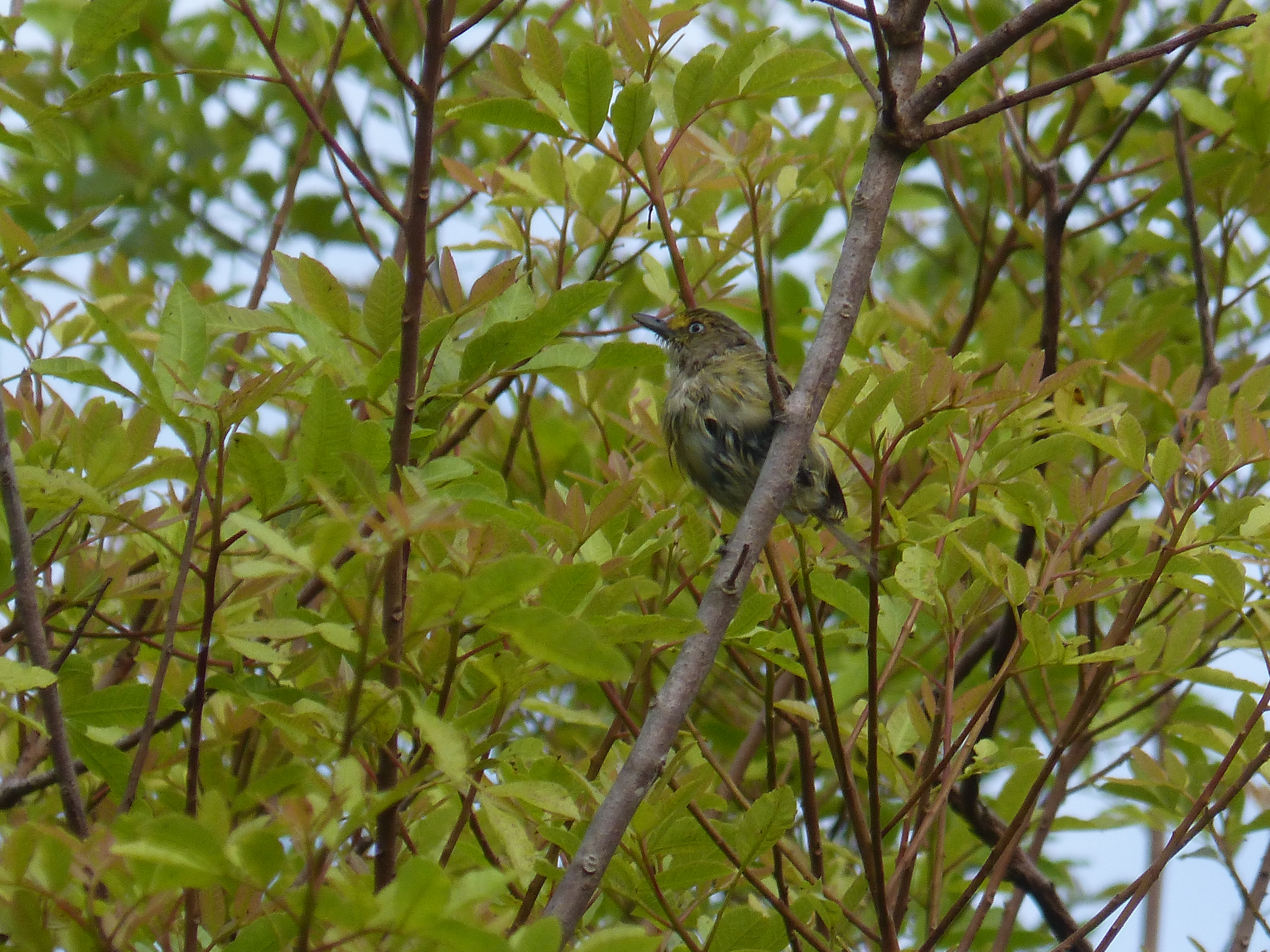
Endemic white-eyed vireo (Vireo griseus bermudianus) in Bermuda

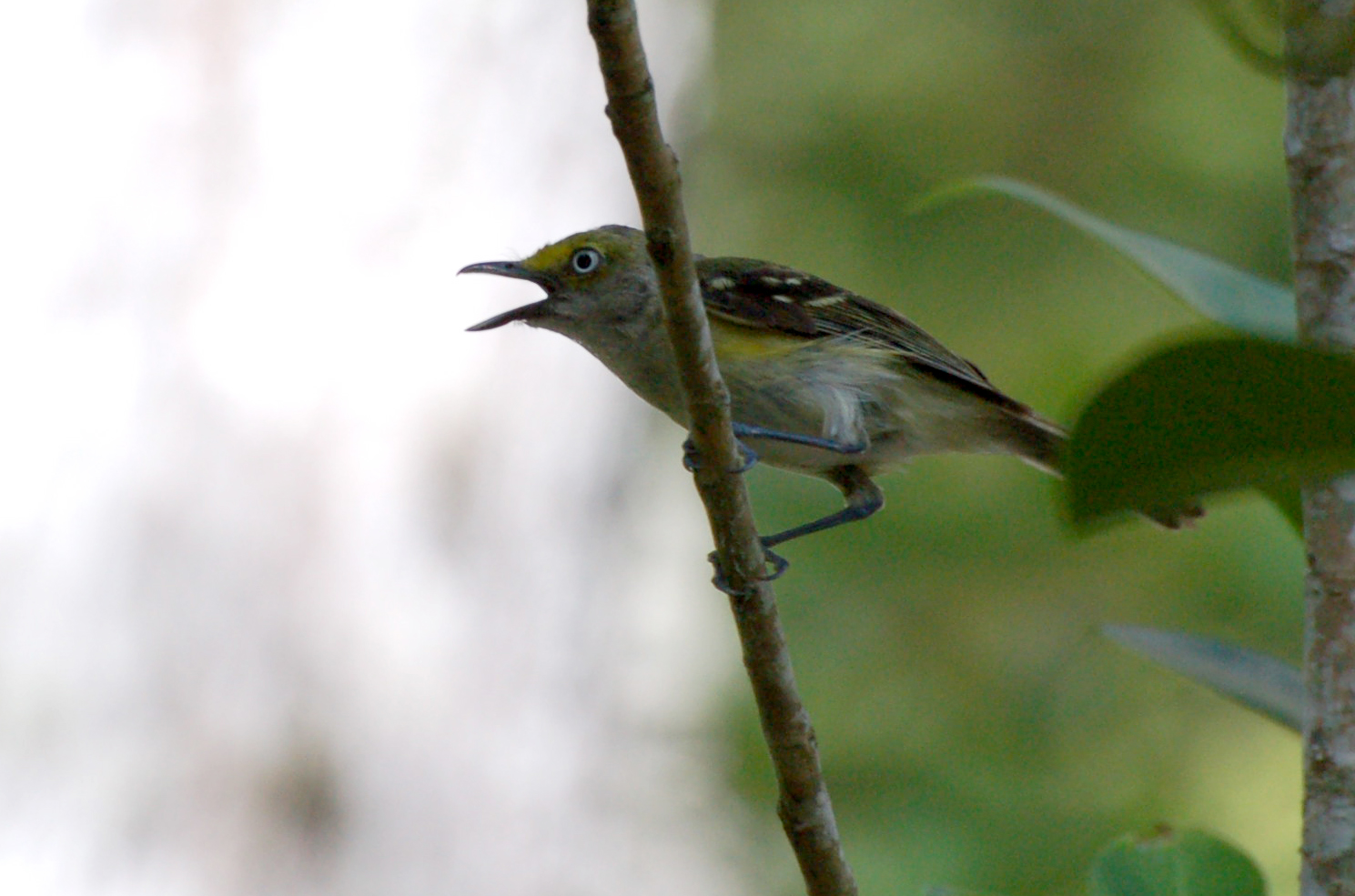
White-eyed vireo (Vireo griseus). In addition to the endemic subspecies, birds from mainland North America like the one pictured are seen outside the breeding season.

The vireos are a group of small to medium-sized passerine birds. They are typically greenish in colour and resemble wood-warblers apart from their heavier bills.

- White-eyed vireo, Vireo griseus
- Yellow-throated vireo, Vireo flavifrons (U)
- Blue-headed vireo, Vireo solitarius (R)
- Philadelphia vireo, Vireo philadelphicus (U)
- Warbling vireo, Vireo gilvus (U)
- Red-eyed vireo, Vireo olivaceus
- Yellow-green vireo, Vireo flavoviridis (VR)
- Black-whiskered vireo, Vireo altiloquus (VR)

== Shrikes ==
Order: Passeriformes Family: Laniidae

Shrikes are passerine birds known for their habit of catching other birds and small animals and impaling the uneaten portions of their bodies on thorns. A shrike's beak is hooked, like that of a typical bird of prey.

- Loggerhead shrike, Lanius ludovicianus (VR)
- Northern shrike, Lanius borealis (R)

== Crows, jays, and magpies ==
Order: Passeriformes Family: Corvidae

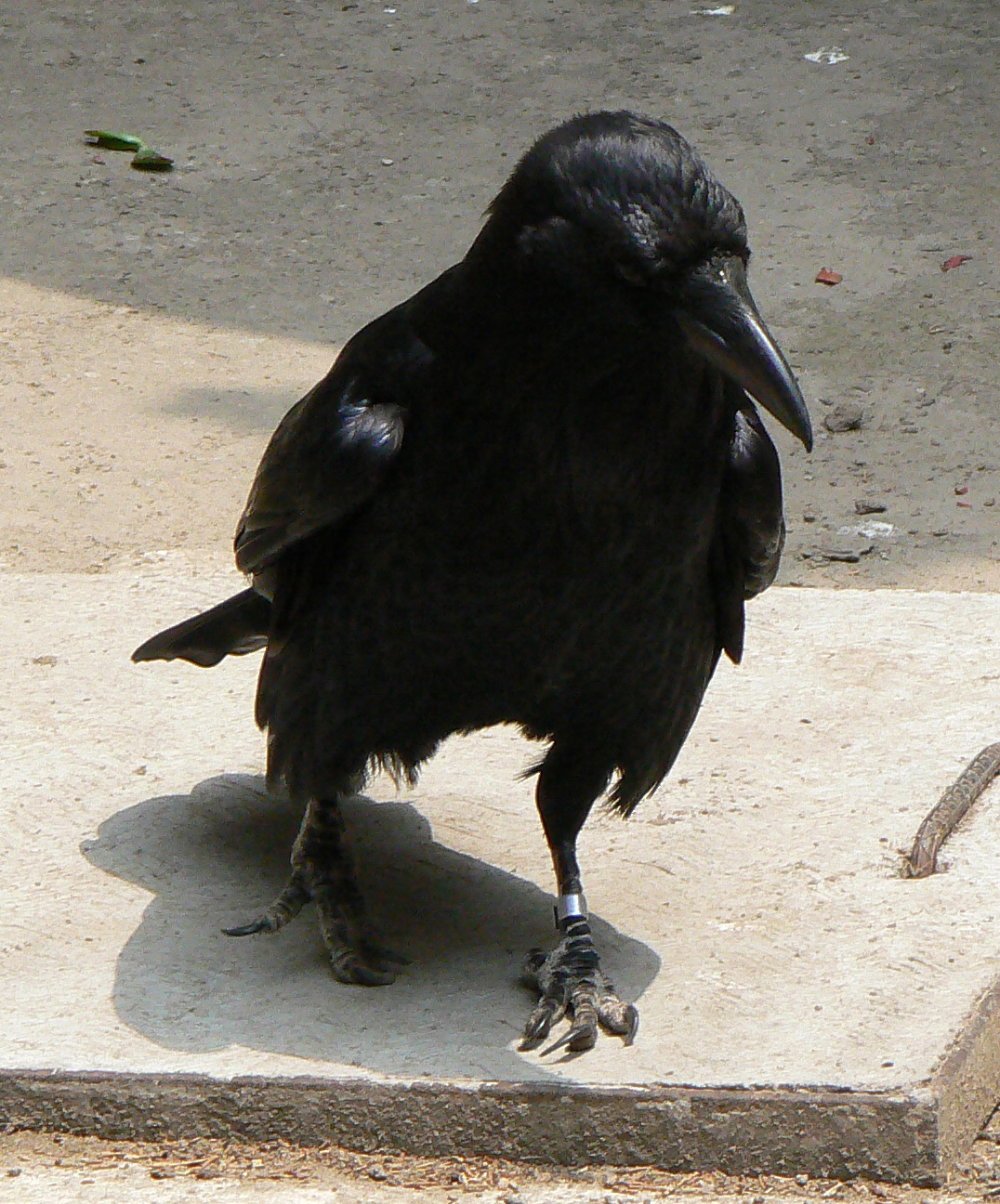
The American crow was introduced in 1840 and is now considered to be a pest.

The family Corvidae includes crows, ravens, jays, choughs, magpies, treepies, nutcrackers, and ground jays. Corvids are above average in size among the Passeriformes, and some of the larger species show high levels of intelligence.

- Blue jay, Cyanocitta cristata (VR)
- American crow, Corvus brachyrhynchos (I)
- Common raven, Corvus corax (VR)

== Larks ==
Order: Passeriformes Family: Alaudidae

Larks are small terrestrial birds with often extravagant songs and display flights. Most larks are fairly dull in appearance. Their food is insects and seeds.

- Eurasian skylark, Alauda arvensis (VR)
- Horned lark, Eremophila alpestris (R)

== Swallows ==
Order: Passeriformes Family: Hirundinidae

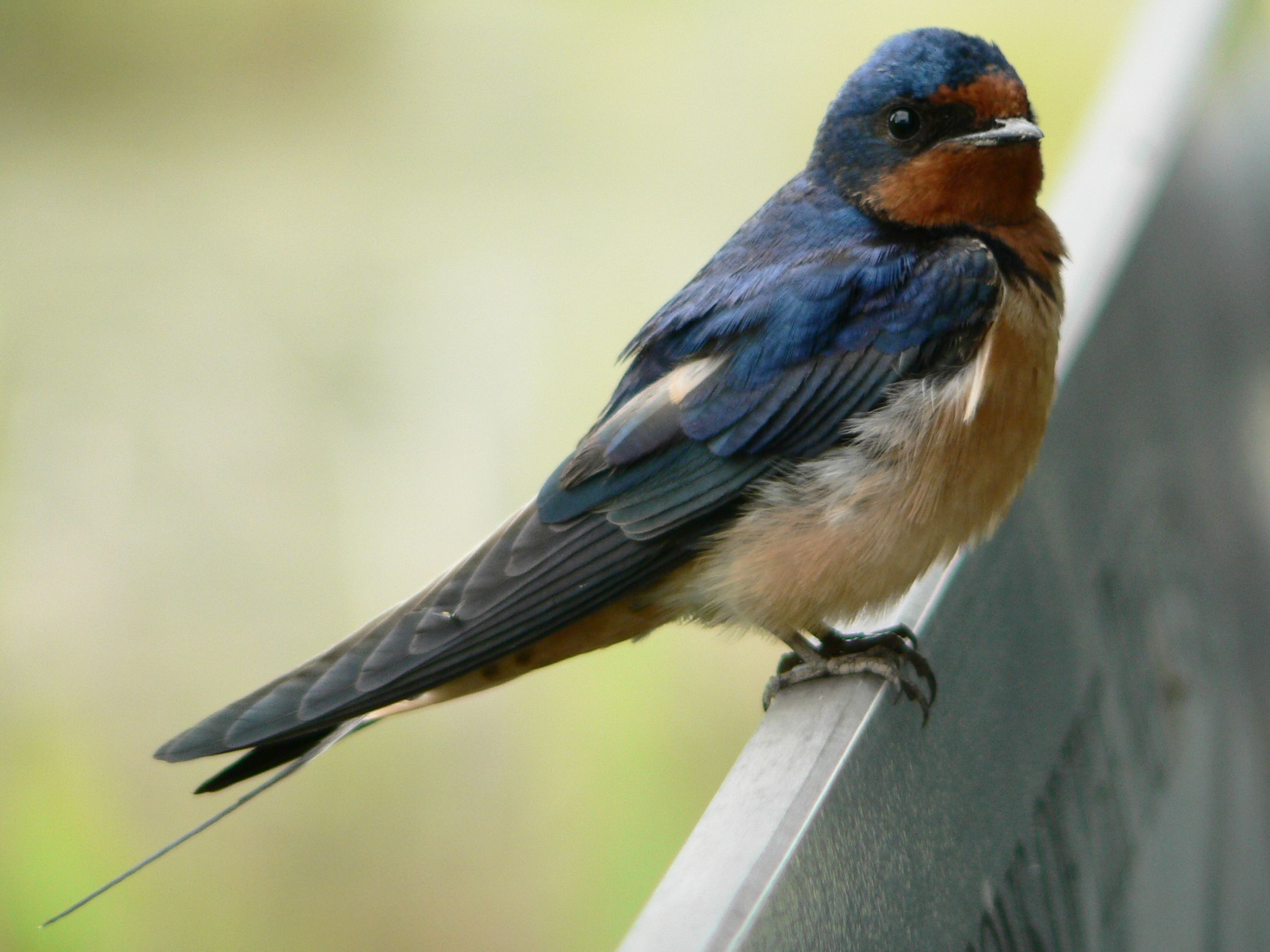
Barn swallow - common over open country during the migration seasons.

The family Hirundinidae is adapted to aerial feeding. They have a slender streamlined body, long pointed wings, and a short bill with a wide gape. The feet are adapted to perching rather than walking, and the front toes are partially joined at the base.

- Bank swallow, Riparia riparia (U)
- Tree swallow, Tachycineta bicolor
- Northern rough-winged swallow, Stelgidopteryx serripennis (VR)
- Purple martin, Progne subis (U)
- Caribbean martin, Progne dominicensis (VR)
- Barn swallow, Hirundo rustica
- Common house-martin, Delichon urbicum (VR)
- Cliff swallow, Petrochelidon pyrrhonota (U)
- Cave swallow, Petrochelidon fulva (VR)

== Leaf warblers ==
Order: Passeriformes Family: Phylloscopidae

Leaf warblers are a family of small insectivorous birds found mostly in Eurasia and ranging into Wallacea and Africa. The Arctic warbler breeds east into Alaska. The species are of various sizes, often green-plumaged above and yellow below, or more subdued with greyish-green to greyish-brown colours.

- Arctic warbler, Phylloscopus borealis (VR)

== Kinglets ==
Order: Passeriformes Family: Regulidae

The kinglets, also called crests, are a small group of birds often included in the Old World warblers, but frequently given family status because they also resemble the titmice.

- Ruby-crowned kinglet, Corthylio calendula (R)
- Golden-crowned kinglet, Regulus satrapa (R)

== Waxwings ==
Order: Passeriformes Family: Bombycillidae

The waxwings are a group of passerine birds with soft silky plumage and unique red tips to some of the wing feathers. In the Bohemian and cedar waxwings, these tips look like sealing wax and give the group its name. These are arboreal birds of northern forests. They live on insects in summer and berries in winter.

- Bohemian waxwing, Bombycilla garrulus (VR)
- Cedar waxwing, Bombycilla cedrorum

== Nuthatches ==
Order: Passeriformes Family: Sittidae

Nuthatches are small woodland birds. They have the unusual ability to climb down trees head first, unlike other birds which can only go upwards. Nuthatches have big heads, short tails, and powerful bills and feet.

- Red-breasted nuthatch, Sitta canadensis (R)
- White-breasted nuthatch, Sitta carolinensis (VR)

== Treecreepers ==
Order: Passeriformes Family: Certhiidae

Treecreepers are small woodland birds, brown above and white below. They have thin pointed down-curved bills, which they use to extricate insects from bark. They have stiff tail feathers, like woodpeckers, which they use to support themselves on vertical trees.

- Brown creeper, Certhia americana (VR)

== Wrens ==
Order: Passeriformes Family: Troglodytidae

The wrens are mainly small and inconspicuous except for their loud songs. These birds have short wings and thin down-turned bills. Several species often hold their tails upright. All are insectivorous.

- House wren, Troglodytes aedon (VR)
- Winter wren, Troglodytes hiemalis (VR)
- Marsh wren, Cistothorus palustris (VR)

== Mockingbirds and thrashers ==
Order: Passeriformes Family: Mimidae

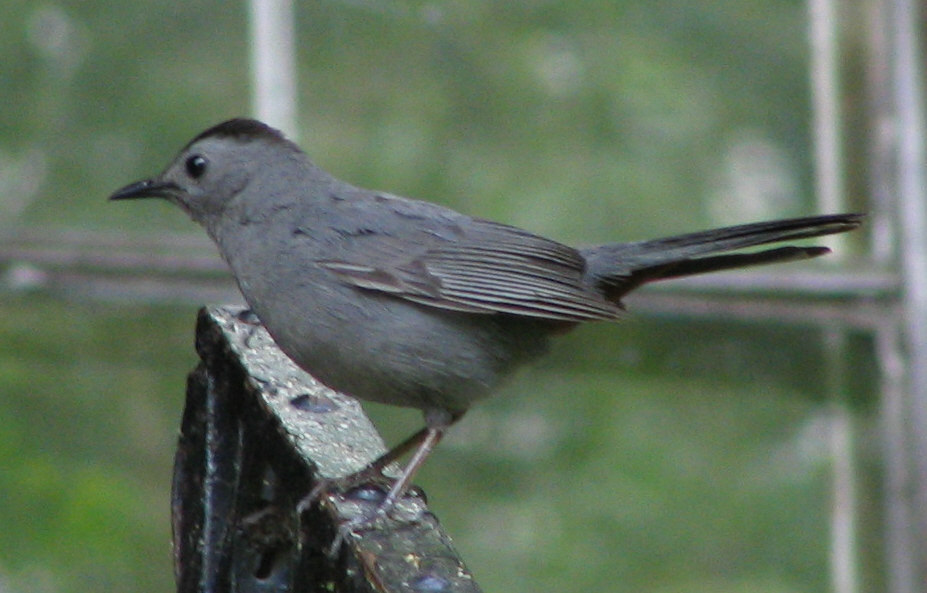
The gray catbird, known locally as the "blackbird", is a native breeding resident.

The mimids are a family of passerine birds that includes thrashers, mockingbirds, tremblers, and the New World catbirds. These birds are notable for their vocalizations, especially their ability to mimic a wide variety of birds and other sounds heard outdoors. Their colouring tends towards dull-greys and browns.

- Gray catbird, Dumetella carolinensis
- Brown thrasher, Toxostoma rufum (R)
- Northern mockingbird, Mimus polyglottos (VR)

== Starlings ==
Order: Passeriformes Family: Sturnidae

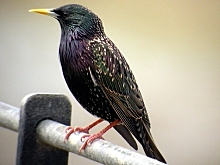
The European starling reached Bermuda from the introduced population in the USA. It is now the most common breeding bird on the islands.

Starlings are small to medium-sized passerine birds. Their flight is strong and direct and they are very gregarious. Their preferred habitat is fairly open country. They eat insects and fruit. Plumage is typically dark with a metallic sheen.

- European starling, Sturnus vulgaris (I)

== Thrushes and allies ==
Order: Passeriformes Family: Turdidae

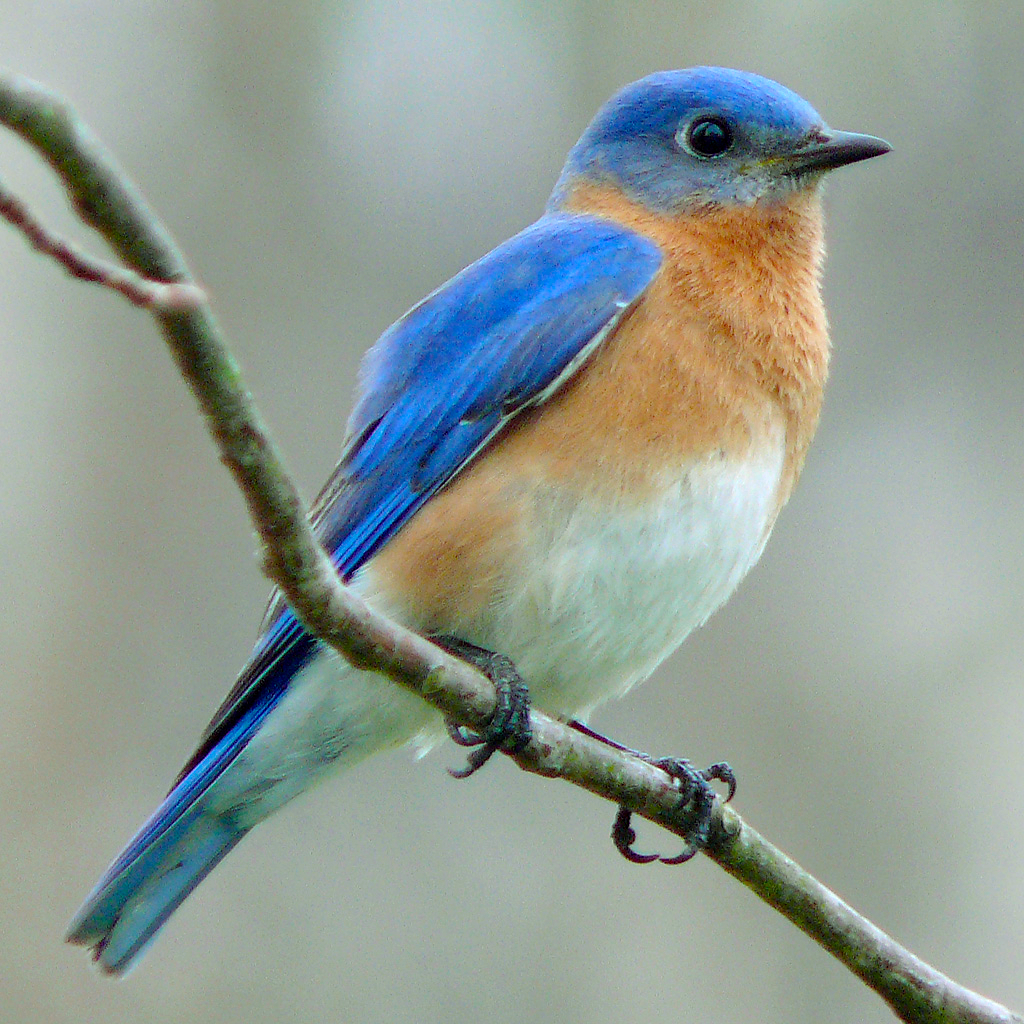
The eastern bluebird has suffered from competition with introduced species and from the decline of the Bermuda cedar.

The thrushes are a group of passerine birds that occur mainly in the Old World. They are plump, soft plumaged, small to medium-sized insectivores or sometimes omnivores, often feeding on the ground. Many have attractive songs.

- Eastern bluebird, Sialia sialis
- Mountain bluebird, Sialia currucoides (VR)
- Veery, Catharus fuscescens (R)
- Gray-cheeked thrush, Catharus minimus (R)
- Bicknell's thrush, Catharus bicknelli (VR)
- Swainson's thrush, Catharus ustulatus (R)
- Hermit thrush, Catharus guttatus (U)
- Wood thrush, Hylocichla mustelina (R)
- American robin, Turdus migratorius (U)
- Varied thrush, Ixoreus naevius (VR)

== Old World flycatchers ==
Order: Passeriformes Family: Muscicapidae

Old World flycatchers are a large group of small passerine birds native to the Old World. They are mainly small arboreal insectivores. The appearance of these birds is highly varied, but they mostly have weak songs and harsh calls.

- Dark-sided flycatcher, Muscicapa sibirica (VR)
- Northern wheatear, Oenanthe oenanthe (VR)

== Waxbills and allies ==
Order: Passeriformes Family: Estrildidae

The estrildid finches are small passerine birds of the Old World tropics and Australasia. They are gregarious and often colonial seed eaters with short thick but pointed bills. They are all similar in structure and habits, but have wide variation in plumage colours and patterns.

- Orange-cheeked waxbill, Estrilda melpoda (I) (VR)
- Common waxbill, Estrilda astrild (I) (VR)

== Old World sparrows ==
Order: Passeriformes Family: Passeridae

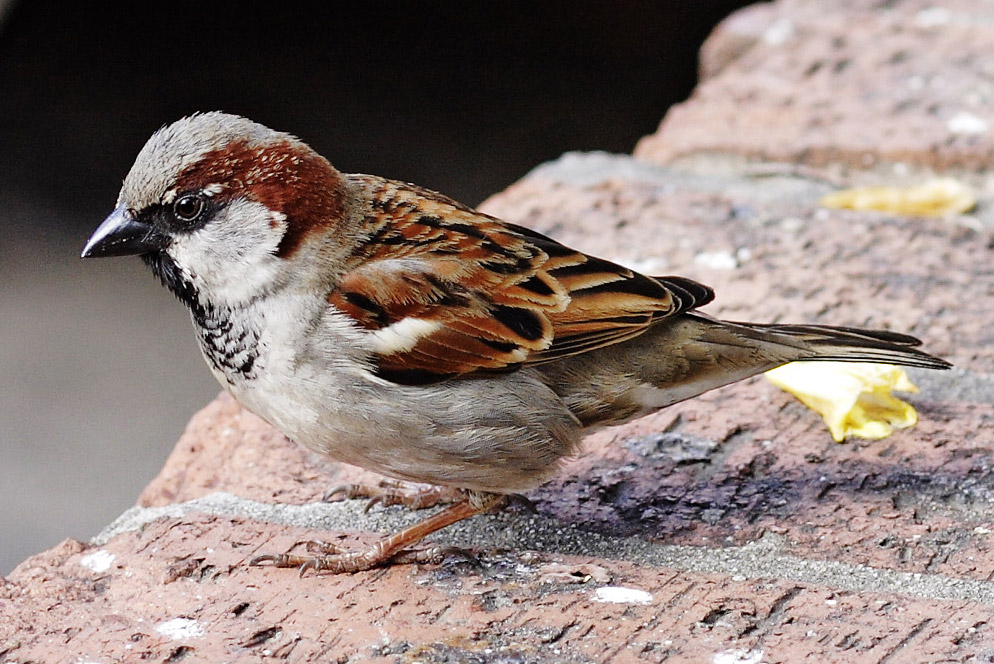
The house sparrow was introduced in 1875 and quickly became common.

Sparrows are small passerine birds. In general, sparrows tend to be small, plump, brown or grey birds with short tails and short powerful beaks. Sparrows are seed eaters, but they also consume small insects.

- House sparrow, Passer domesticus (I)

== Wagtails and pipits ==
Order: Passeriformes Family: Motacillidae

Motacillidae is a family of small passerine birds with medium to long tails. They include the wagtails, longclaws, and pipits. They are slender ground-feeding insectivores of open country.

- American pipit, Anthus rubescens (U)

== Finches, euphonias, and allies ==
Order: Passeriformes Family: Fringillidae

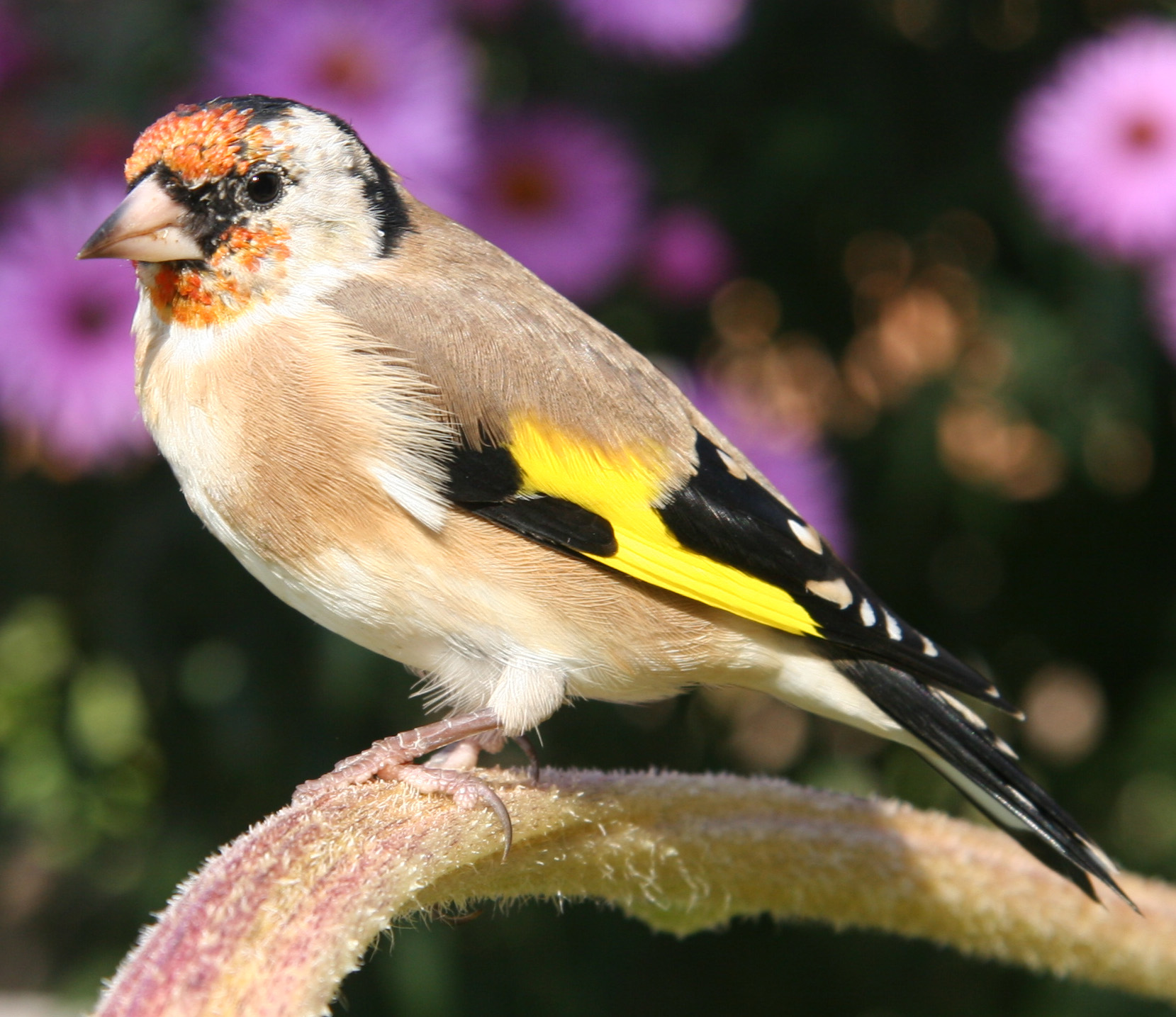
European goldfinch - a common introduced species.

Finches are seed-eating passerine birds, that are small to moderately large and have a strong beak, usually conical and in some species very large. All have twelve tail feathers and nine primaries. These birds have a bouncing flight with alternating bouts of flapping and gliding on closed wings, and most sing well.

- Evening grosbeak, Coccothraustes vespertinus (VR)
- Pine grosbeak, Pinicola enucleator (VR)
- Purple finch, Haemorhous purpureus (VR)
- Common redpoll, Acanthis flammea (R)
- Red crossbill, Loxia curvirostra (VR)
- Hispaniolan crossbill, Loxia megaplaga (VR)
- White-winged crossbill, Loxia leucoptera (VR)
- Pine siskin, Spinus pinus (VR)
- American goldfinch, Spinus tristis (VR)
- European goldfinch, Carduelis carduelis (I) (Not on the AOS Check-list)

== Longspurs and snow buntings ==
Order: Passeriformes Family: Calcariidae

The Calcariidae are a group of passerine birds that were traditionally grouped with the New World sparrows, but differ in a number of respects and are usually found in open grassy areas.

- Lapland longspur, Calcarius lapponicus (VR)
- Snow bunting, Plectrophenax nivalis (R)

== New World sparrows ==
Order: Passeriformes Family: Passerellidae

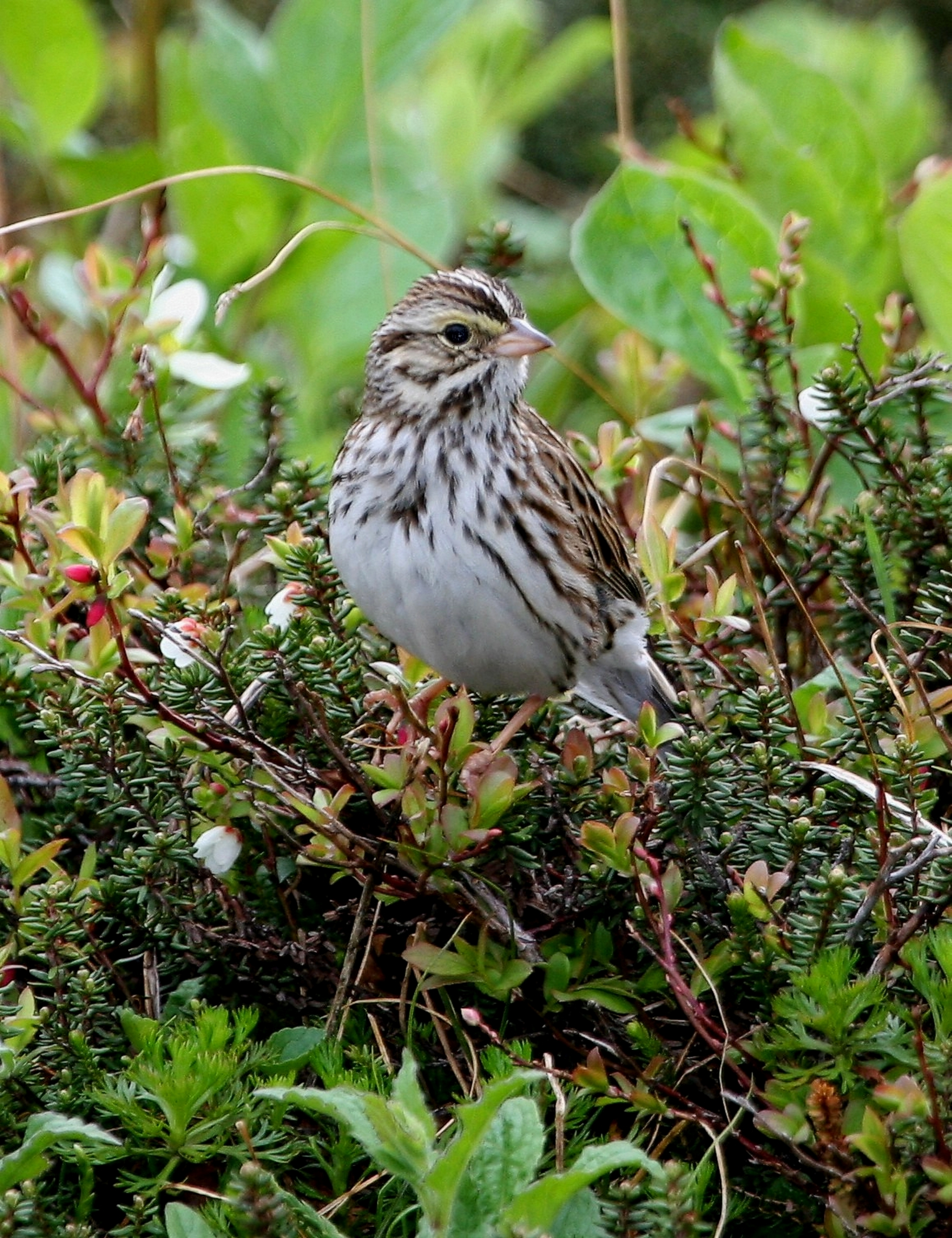
The Savannah sparrow is the most frequent of the migrant sparrows.

Until 2017, these species were considered part of the family Emberizidae. Most of the species are known as sparrows, but these birds are not closely related to the Old World sparrows which are in the family Passeridae. Many of these have distinctive head patterns.

- Grasshopper sparrow, Ammodramus savannarum (U)
- Lark sparrow, Chondestes grammacus (VR)
- Chipping sparrow, Spizella passerina (U)
- Clay-colored sparrow, Spizella pallida (R)
- Field sparrow, Spizella pusilla (VR)
- American tree sparrow, Spizelloides arborea (VR)
- Fox sparrow, Passerella iliaca (R)
- Dark-eyed junco, Junco hyemalis (U)
- White-crowned sparrow, Zonotrichia leucophrys (U)
- White-throated sparrow, Zonotrichia albicollis (U)
- Vesper sparrow, Pooecetes gramineus (R)
- LeConte's sparrow, Ammospiza lecontii (VR)
- Nelson's sparrow, Ammospiza nelsoni (VR)
- Saltmarsh sparrow, Ammospiza caudacuta (VR)
- Savannah sparrow, Passerculus sandwichensis
- Song sparrow, Melospiza melodia (R)
- Lincoln's sparrow, Melospiza lincolnii (U)
- Swamp sparrow, Melospiza georgiana (U)
- Eastern towhee, Pipilo erythrophthalmus (VR)
- Bermuda towhee, Pipilo naufragus (E) (extinct)

== Yellow-breasted chat ==
Order: Passeriformes Family: Icteriidae

This species was historically placed in the wood-warblers (Parulidae) but nonetheless most authorities were unsure if it belonged there. It was placed in its own family in 2017.

- Yellow-breasted chat, Icteria virens (R)

== Troupials and allies ==
Order: Passeriformes Family: Icteridae

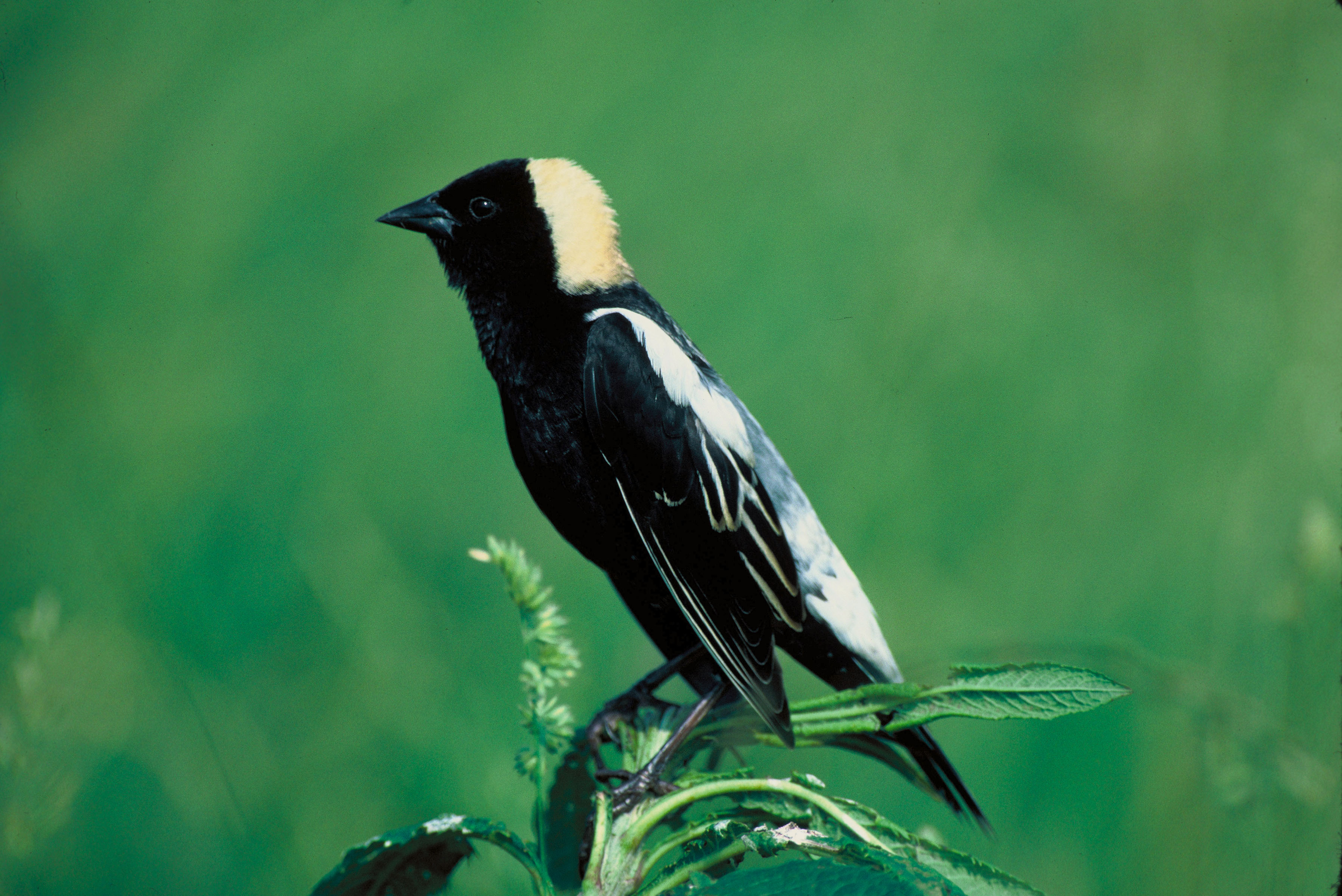
Large numbers of bobolinks pass through in September and October.

The icterids are a group of small to medium-sized, often colourful, passerine birds restricted to the New World and include the grackles, New World blackbirds, and New World orioles. Most species have black as the predominant plumage colour, often enlivened by yellow, orange, or red.

- Yellow-headed blackbird, Xanthocephalus xanthocephalus (VR)
- Bobolink, Dolichonyx oryzivorus
- Eastern meadowlark, Sturnella magna (VR)
- Orchard oriole, Icterus spurius (R)
- Baltimore oriole, Icterus galbula (U)
- Red-winged blackbird, Agelaius phoeniceus (R)
- Brown-headed cowbird, Molothrus ater (R)
- Rusty blackbird, Euphagus carolinus (VR)
- Common grackle, Quiscalus quiscula (VR)

== New World warblers ==
Order: Passeriformes Family: Parulidae

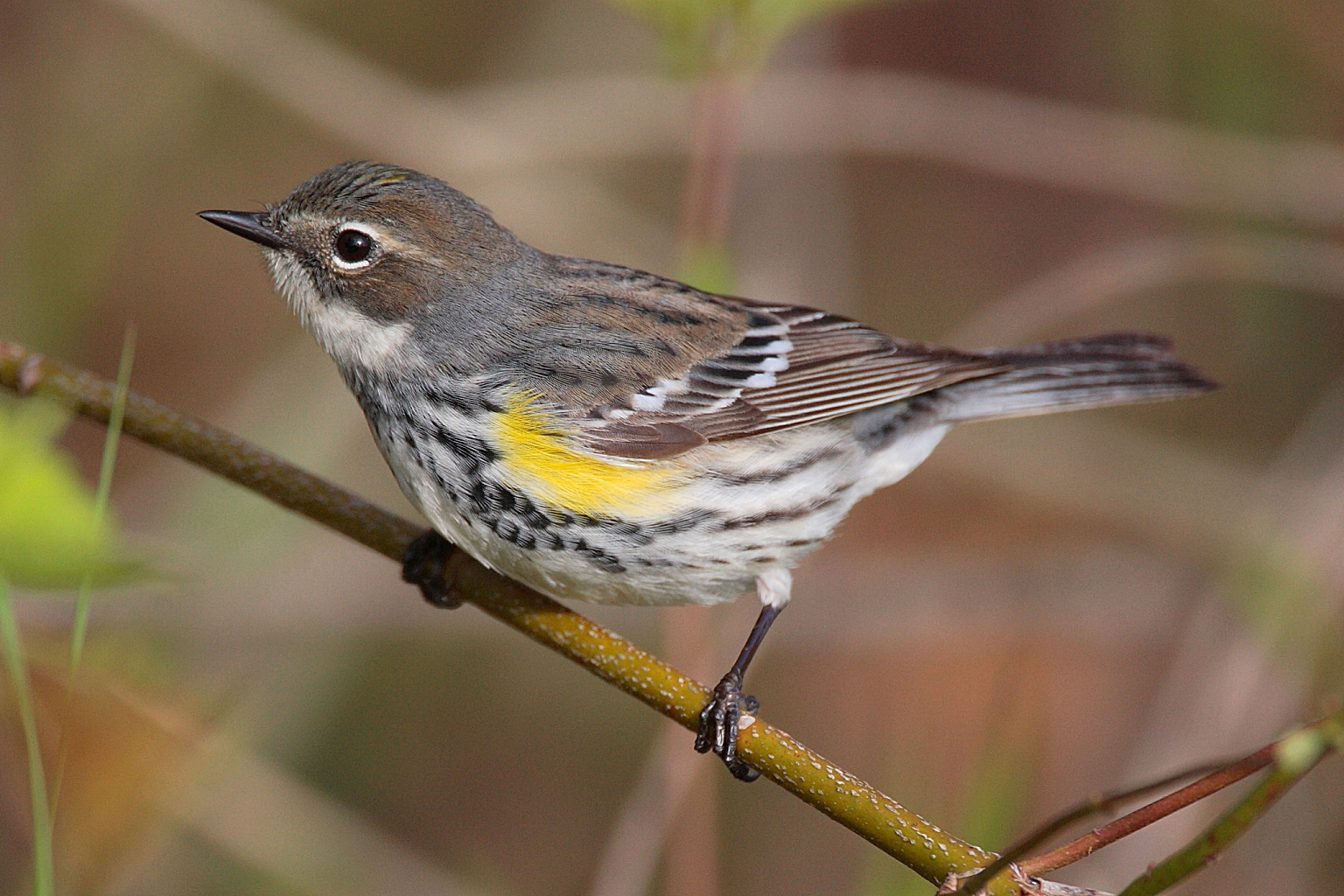
Yellow-rumped (myrtle) warbler - a common migrant, often seen in flocks.

The New World warblers are a group of small, often colourful, passerine birds restricted to the New World. Most are arboreal, but some are terrestrial. Most members of this family are insectivores.

- Ovenbird, Seiurus aurocapilla
- Worm-eating warbler, Helmitheros vermivorum (U)
- Louisiana waterthrush, Parkesia motacilla (U)
- Northern waterthrush, Parkesia noveboracensis
- Golden-winged warbler, Vermivora chrysoptera (R)
- Blue-winged warbler, Vermivora cyanoptera (U)
- Black-and-white warbler, Mniotilta varia
- Prothonotary warbler, Protonotaria citrea (U)
- Swainson's warbler, Limnothlypis swainsonii (R)
- Tennessee warbler, Leiothlypis peregrina (U)
- Orange-crowned warbler, Leiothlypis celata (U)
- Nashville warbler, Leiothlypis ruficapilla (U)
- Connecticut warbler, Oporornis agilis (U)
- MacGillivray's warbler, Geothlypis tolmiei (VR)
- Mourning warbler, Geothlypis philadelphia (U)
- Kentucky warbler, Geothlypis formosa (U)
- Common yellowthroat, Geothlypis trichas
- Hooded warbler, Setophaga citrina (U)
- American redstart, Setophaga ruticilla
- Kirtland's warbler, Setophaga kirtlandii (VR)
- Cape May warbler, Setophaga tigrina (U)
- Cerulean warbler, Setophaga cerulea (R)
- Northern parula, Setophaga americana
- Magnolia warbler, Setophaga magnolia (U)
- Bay-breasted warbler, Setophaga castanea (U)
- Blackburnian warbler, Setophaga fusca (U)
- Yellow warbler, Setophaga petechia
- Chestnut-sided warbler, Setophaga pensylvanica
- Blackpoll warbler, Setophaga striata
- Black-throated blue warbler, Setophaga caerulescens (U)
- Palm warbler, Setophaga palmarum
- Pine warbler, Setophaga pinus (U)
- Yellow-rumped warbler, Setophaga coronata
- Yellow-throated warbler, Setophaga dominica (U)
- Prairie warbler, Setophaga discolor (U)
- Townsend's warbler, Setophaga townsendi (VR)
- Black-throated green warbler, Setophaga virens (U)
- Canada warbler, Cardellina canadensis (U)
- Wilson's warbler, Cardellina pusilla (U)

== Cardinals and allies ==
Order: Passeriformes Family: Cardinalidae

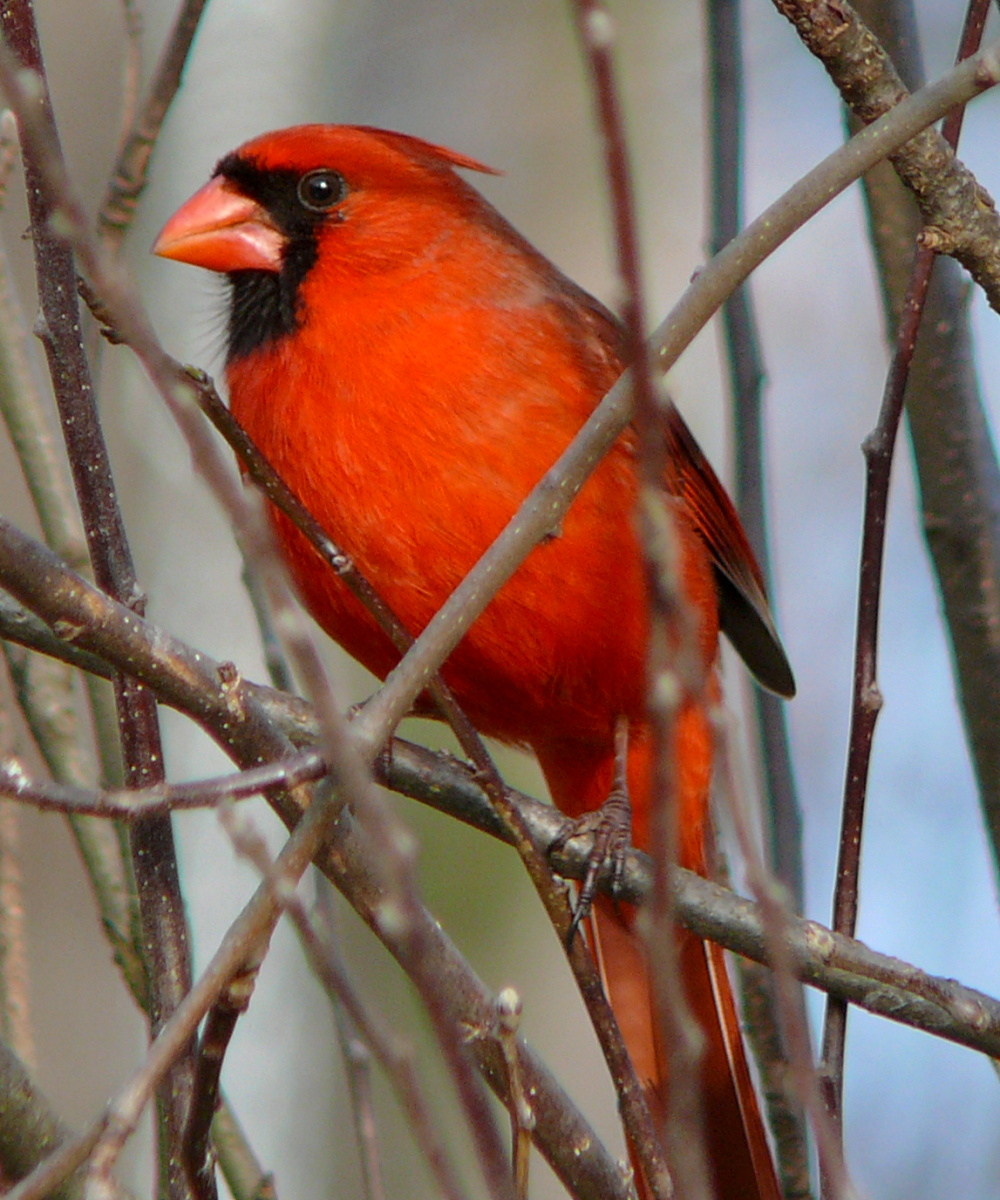
Northern cardinal - an introduced species often seen in parks and gardens.

The cardinals are a family of robust, seed-eating birds with strong bills. They are typically associated with open woodland. The sexes usually have distinct plumages.

- Summer tanager, Piranga rubra (U)
- Scarlet tanager, Piranga olivacea (U)
- Western tanager, Piranga ludoviciana (VR)
- Northern cardinal, Cardinalis cardinalis (I)
- Rose-breasted grosbeak, Pheucticus ludovicianus (U)
- Blue grosbeak, Passerina caerulea (U)
- Indigo bunting, Passerina cyanea
- Painted bunting, Passerina ciris (VR)
- Dickcissel, Spiza americana (R)

== See also ==
- Flora and fauna of Bermuda
- List of birds
- Lists of birds by region
