= Sinky Bay, Bermuda =

Beach in Bermuda

Coordinates: 32.249°N 64.834°W

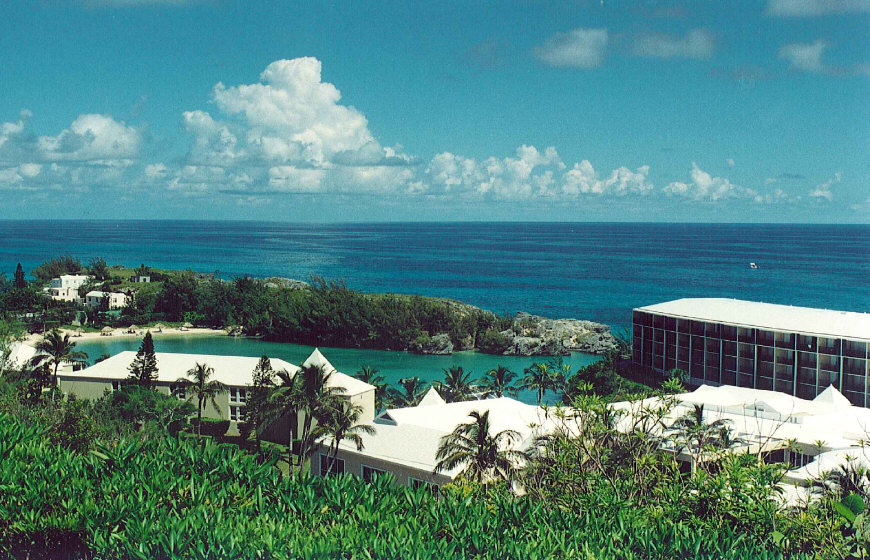
Sinky Bay, Bermuda

Sinky Bay is a beach in Bermuda. Though this is the name of the beach, the area between Sinky Bay and Cross Bay, and including the lands owned by the hotel are known as Sinky Bay.

Sinky Bay was entirely owned by the Wilson Clan. The portion of land on which the hotel stands, was sold to the hotel group by part of the Wilson family. The remaining owned Wilson property sits between the hotel and the beaches. The beaches, Cross Bay and Sinky Bay, are accessible to the hotel guests, the Wilson family and the surrounding neighbourhood.
