= Geology of Bermuda =

The geology of Bermuda represents an isolated limestone island in the Atlantic at the edge of the shallow Bermuda Platform. This platform is part of the larger Bermuda Pedestal (other high points include the Challenger and Plantagenet banks, separated by water 1000 feet deep). The island's volcanic basement rock is relatively shallow, only 75 meters below the surface of the water and includes 700 meters of tholeiitic lavas and lamprophyre sheets dated to 33 million years ago. The oceanic crust around the island is about 120 million years old. Volcaniclastic turbidite deposits 140 kilometers offshore to the southeast indicate that Bermuda volcanoes were exposed above the water and eroding by the Oligocene. The volcano that built the island's basement is inferred to be mid-plate hotspot volcanism, and was formed when a disturbance in the transition zone led magma from the zone toward Earth's surface. Eolian limestone and hills dominates much of the surface geology of Bermuda, interbedded with layers of paleosols.
