= List of mammals of Bermuda =

This is a list of the mammal species recorded in Bermuda. Of the mammal species in Bermuda, one is endangered and one is vulnerable.

The following tags are used to highlight each species' conservation status as assessed by the International Union for Conservation of Nature:

EX	Extinct	No reasonable doubt that the last individual has died.
EW	Extinct in the wild	Known only to survive in captivity or as a naturalized populations well outside its previous range.
CR	Critically endangered	The species is in imminent risk of extinction in the wild.
EN	Endangered	The species is facing an extremely high risk of extinction in the wild.
VU	Vulnerable	The species is facing a high risk of extinction in the wild.
NT	Near threatened	The species does not meet any of the criteria that would categorise it as risking extinction but it is likely to do so in the future.
LC	Least concern	There are no current identifiable risks to the species.
DD	Data deficient	There is inadequate information to make an assessment of the risks to this species.

The following tags have been used to highlight several categories of occurrence:

- (I) Introduced - a species introduced to Bermudas as a consequence, direct or indirect, of human actions
- (V) Vagrant - a species that accidentally appears on Bermuda

== Order: Rodentia (rodents) ==
Rodents make up the largest order of mammals, with over 40% of mammalian species. They have two incisors in the upper and lower jaw which grow continually and must be kept short by gnawing. Most rodents are small though the capybara can weigh up to 45 kg (99 lb).

- Family: Muridae
  - Subfamily: Murinae
    - Genus: Mus
      - House mouse, M. musculus (I)
- Family: Muridae
  - Subfamily: Murinae
    - Genus: Rattus
      - Brown rat, R. norvegicus (I)
      - Black rat, R. rattus (I)

== Order: Chiroptera (bats) ==
The bats' most distinguishing feature is that their forelimbs are developed as wings, making them the only mammals capable of flight. Bat species account for about 20% of all mammals.

- Family: Vespertilionidae
  - Subfamily: Myotinae
    - Genus: Lasionycteris
      - Silver-haired bat, L. noctivagans LC
  - Subfamily: Vespertilioninae
    - Genus: Lasiurus
      - Eastern red bat, Lasiurus borealis LR/lc
      - Hoary bat, Lasiurus cinereus LR/lc

== Order: Carnivora (carnivorans) ==
There are over 260 species of carnivorans, the majority of which feed primarily on meat. They have a characteristic skull shape and dentition.

- Family: Phocidae
  - Subfamily: Phocinae
    - Genus: Phoca
      - Harbor seal, P. vitulina (V)
- Family: Phocidae
  - Subfamily: Phocinae
    - Genus: Halichoerus
      - Gray seal, H. grypus

== Order: Artiodactyla (even toed ungulates) ==
The even-toed ungulates are ungulates whose weight is borne about equally by the third and fourth toes, rather than mostly or entirely by the third as in perissodactyls. There are about 220 artiodactyl species, including many that are of great economic importance to humans.

- Family: Suidae
  - Subfamily: Suinae
    - Genus: Sus
      - Wild boar, S. scrofa (I)

== Order: Sirenia (manatees and dugongs) ==
Sirenia is an order of fully aquatic, herbivorous mammals that inhabit rivers, estuaries, coastal marine waters, swamps, and marine wetlands. All four species are threatened.

- Family: Trichechidae
  - Subfamily: Trichechinae
    - Genus: Trichechus
      - West Indian manatee, T. manatus (V)

== Order: Cetacea (whales) ==
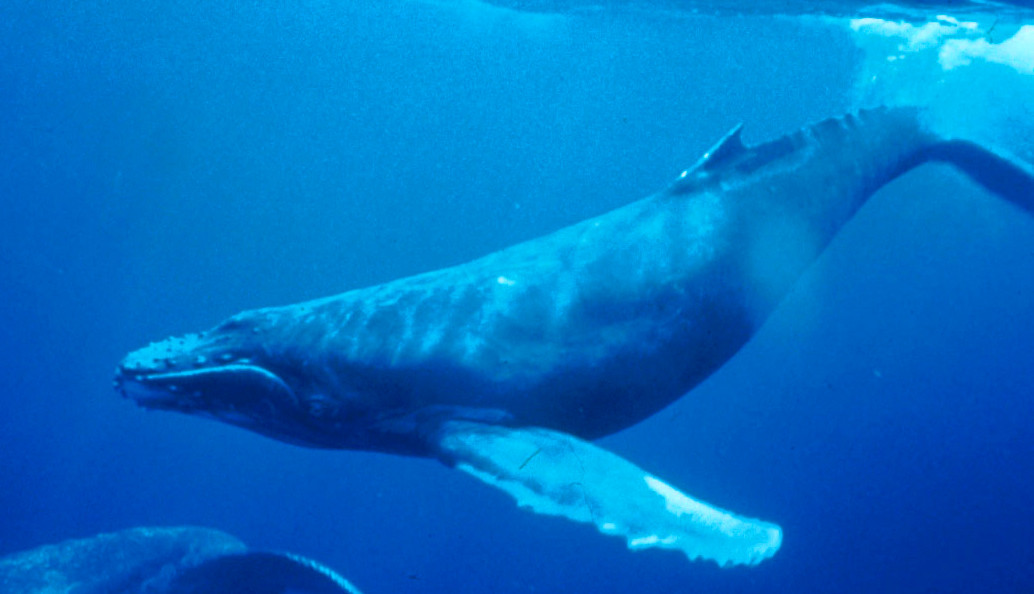
Humpback whale

The order Cetacea includes whales, dolphins and porpoises. They are the mammals most fully adapted to aquatic life with a spindle-shaped nearly hairless body, protected by a thick layer of blubber, and forelimbs and tail modified to provide propulsion underwater.

- Suborder: Mysticeti
  - Family: Balaenidae
    - Genus: Eubalaena
      - North Atlantic right whale, Eubalaena glacialis EN
  - Family: Balaenopteridae
    - Genus: Balaenoptera
      - Common minke whale, Balaenoptera acutorostrata LC
      - Sei whale, Balaenoptera borealis EN
      - Bryde's whale, Balaenoptera brydei DD
      - Blue whale, Balaenoptera musculus EN
      - Fin whale, Balaenoptera physalus EN
    - Subfamily: Megapterinae
      - Genus: Megaptera
        - Humpback whale, Megaptera novaeangliae VU
- Suborder: Odontoceti
  - Superfamily: Platanistoidea
    - Family: Delphinidae (marine dolphins)
      - Genus: Lagenodelphis
        - Fraser's dolphin, Lagenodelphis hosei DD
      - Genus: Grampus
        - Risso's dolphin, Grampus griseus DD
      - Genus: Globicephala
        - Short-finned pilot whale, Globicephala macrorhynchus DD
        - Long-finned pilot whale, Globicephala melas DD
      - Genus: Orcinus
        - Killer whale, Orcinus orca DD
      - Genus: Feresa
        - Pygmy killer whale, Feresa attenuata DD
      - Genus: Stenella
        - Pantropical spotted dolphin, Stenella attenuata LC
        - Clymene dolphin, Stenella clymene DD
        - Striped dolphin, Stenella coeruleoalba LC
        - Atlantic spotted dolphin, Stenella frontalis DD
        - Spinner dolphin, Stenella longirostris DD
      - Genus: Tursiops
        - Common bottlenose dolphin, Tursiops truncatus LC
    - Family: Physeteridae
      - Genus: Physeter
        - Sperm whale, Physeter catodon VU
    - Family: Kogiidae
      - Genus: Kogia
        - Pygmy sperm whale, Kogia breviceps DD
        - Dwarf sperm whale, Kogia sima DD
    - Family: Ziphiidae
      - Genus: Mesoplodon
        - Blainville's beaked whale, Mesoplodon bidens DD
        - Gervais' beaked whale, Mesoplodon europaeus DD
        - True's beaked whale, Mesoplodon mirus DD
      - Genus: Ziphius
        - Cuvier's beaked whale, Ziphius cavirostris DD

== See also ==
- List of chordate orders
- Lists of mammals by region
- List of prehistoric mammals
- Mammal classification
- List of mammals described in the 2000s
