= Television in Bermuda =

Television in Bermuda was introduced in 1958. All broadcast television stations serving the islands of Bermuda operate from the city of Hamilton, Bermuda. The current television stations in Bermuda include:

- ZFB-TV, an ABC affiliate owned by Bermuda Broadcasting
- ZBM-TV, a CBS affiliate owned by Bermuda Broadcasting

The other television station formerly serving across this country was:

- VSB-TV, an NBC affiliate (defunct in 2014)

== See also ==
- List of the Caribbean television channels
- List of television stations in North America by media market
