= List of schools in Bermuda =

This is a list of schools in Bermuda. It includes aided schools, maintained schools and private schools.

== Primary (Elementary) schools ==
- Dalton E. Tucker Primary School
- East End Primary School
- Elliot Primary School
- Francis Patton Primary School
- Gilbert Institute
- Heron Bay Primary School
- Harrington Sound Primary School
- Northlands Primary School
- Paget Primary School
- Prospect Primary School
- Port Royal Primary School
- Purvis Primary School
- St David's Primary School
- St George's Preparatory School
- Somerset Primary School
- Victor Scott Primary School
- West End Primary School
- West Pembroke Primary School

== Middle schools ==
- Dellwood Middle School
- Sandys Secondary Middle School
- Whitney Institute Middle School

== Senior (High) schools ==
- Cedarbridge Academy
- The Berkeley Institute

== Special schools ==
- Dame Marjorie Bean Hope Academy
- The Education Center

== Private schools ==
- Bermuda Centre for Creative Learning
- Somersfield Academy
- Chatmore British International School
- Bermuda High School for Girls
- Bermuda Institute
- Saltus Grammar School
- Warwick Academy
- Mount Saint Agnes Academy

== See also ==
- Bermuda College
- Education in Bermuda
