= Stella Maris Church, St. George's =

Catholic parish in Bermuda

Coordinates: 32°22′57″N 64°40′38″W

Stella Maris Church
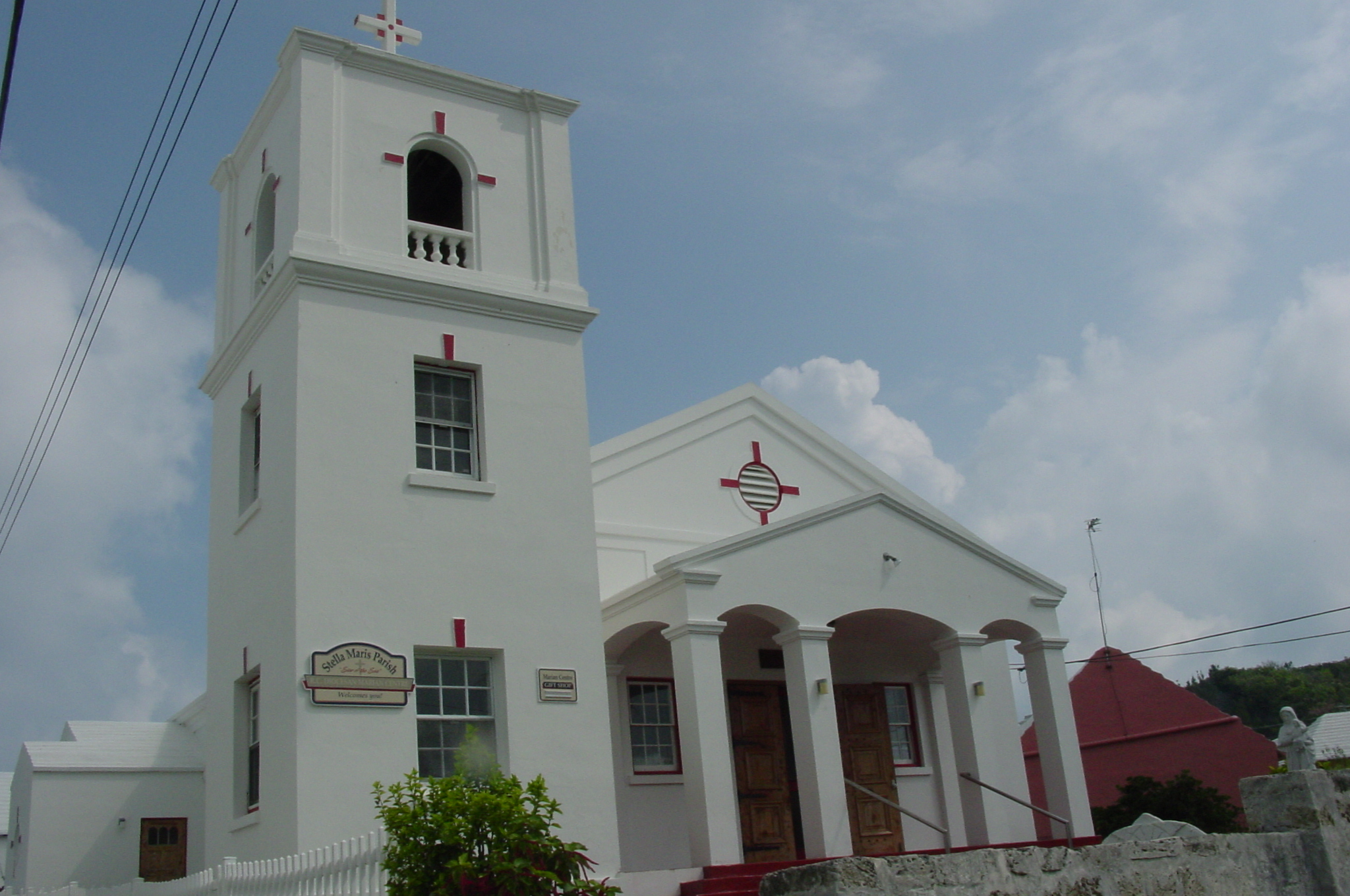
- Stella Maris Church
- Location: St. George's
- Country: Bermuda; United Kingdom
- Denomination: Catholic Church

The Stella Maris Church is the name given to a parish church of the Catholic Church. It is located at 3 Duke of Clarence Street, in the town of Saint George's of the British Overseas Territory of Bermuda in the North Atlantic Ocean.

== History ==
Catholic worship in St. George's had been occurring since 1849 when services were permitted in the chapel of the British Army's Bermuda Garrison. When the American Kindley Air Force Base was established during the Second World War, the American Catholic chaplain held services for local Bermudan Catholics. A church building fund was set up in 1930 and, due to American workers arriving to work on the Air Force Base, the fund held a total of $24,000 by 1948.

In 1937, the owner of the Mid-Ocean News sold an old house to the Catholics. They used this house as the basis for construction of a Catholic chapel. The church began as this chapel in 1947, with them holding their first Mass service on Christmas that year. Stella Maris Church was formally inaugurated and blessed by the Archbishop of Halifax in February 1948.

As its name implies, the church is dedicated to the Virgin Mary in her title Stella Maris, or 'Star of the Sea.' In 2000, it was declared a centre of Marian veneration of the diocese. The church is used as a central location for the Portuguese diaspora in Bermuda when they celebrate the annual Festival of the Holy Spirit, based upon traditional practices from the Azores. The priest of Stella Maris also traditionally visits cruise ships in the St. George's Harbour due to the decline in the number of cruise companies having a resident priest onboard.

== See also ==
- Roman Catholicism in the United Kingdom
