= List of the oldest buildings in Bermuda =

This article attempts to list the oldest extant buildings in Bermuda.

Building	Image	Location	First Built	Notes
State House		St. George's	1620	The State House in St. George's was the home of Bermuda's parliament from 1620 until the capital's relocation to Hamilton in 1815.
Carter House		St. David's	1640	
Walsingham House		Hamilton Parish	1652	Built in 1652 as a private home for the Trott family
Old Rectory		St. George's	1699	
Bridge House		St. George's	1700	
Palmetto House		Devonshire Parish	c. 1700	
Windsong House		Warwick Parish	1700	
Ardsheal		Hamilton	c. 1700	
Globe Hotel		St. George's	1700	

== See also ==
- Architecture of Bermuda
