= Bermuda National Library =

Library in Bermuda

Coordinates: 32.2929°N 64.7865°W

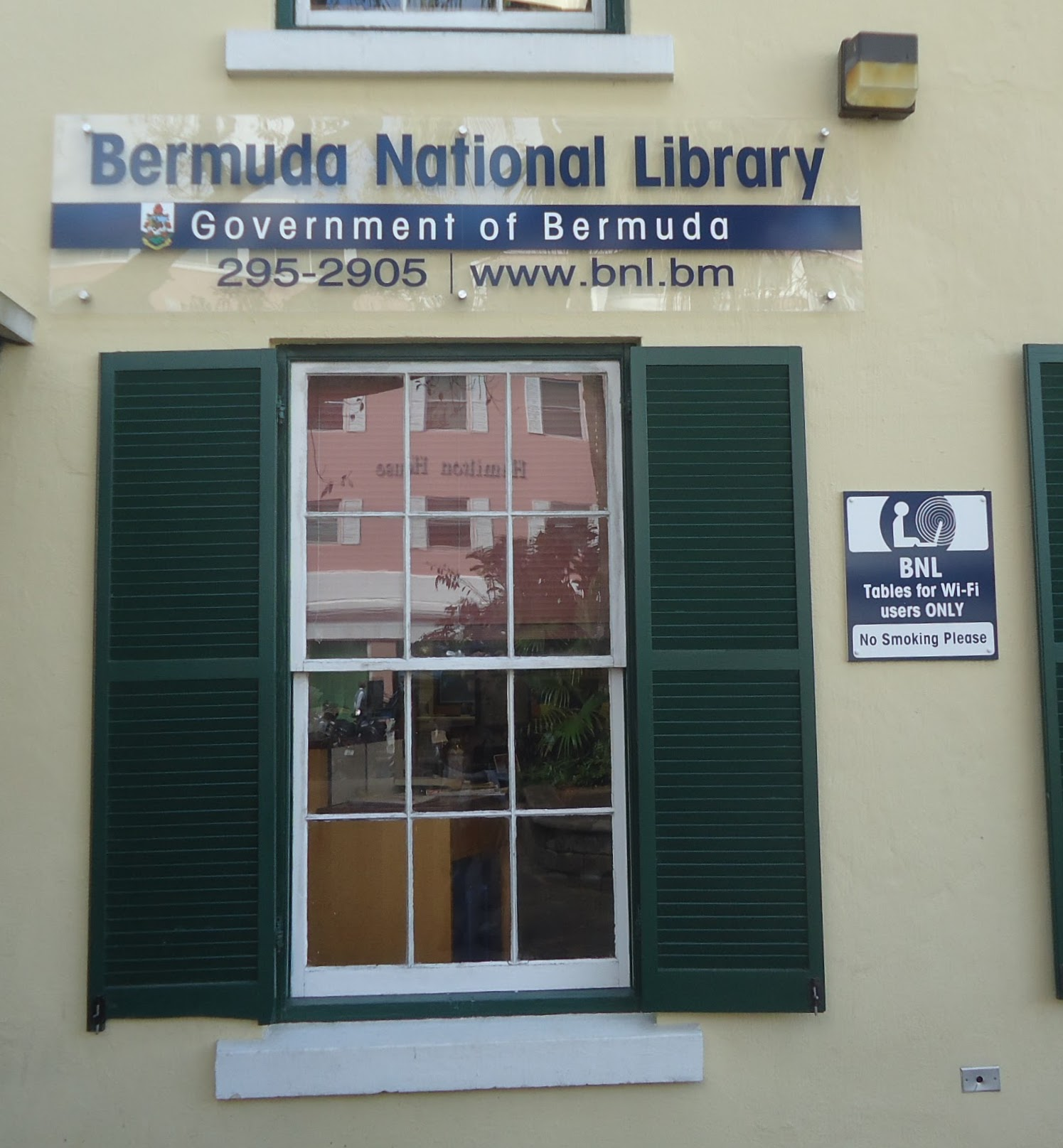
- Location: Hamilton, Bermuda
- Established: 1839

Collection
- Items collected: books, reference collection, newspapers, eBooks, magazines, DVDs, sound and music recordings, language Tapes, audio book CDs
- Size: 100,000 items
- Legal deposit: Yes, since 1832.

Other information
- Website: www.bnl.bm

The Bermuda National Library is the national library in Bermuda and it is located in the capital city of Hamilton. It was founded in 1839 by British soldier, administrator and meteorologist Sir William Reid, who was Governor and Commander-in-Chief of Bermuda from 1839 to 1846. At the time, it was located in the current Cabinet Building.

== Overview ==
It is now located in Par-la-ville Park off of Queen Street and Par-la-ville Road, between Church and Front Streets in the capital. It is only open during traditional daytime hours Monday through Friday and on Saturdays. The library offers on-line services available to residents who register and obtain a membership number. The services include an online catalog, EBSCO, host of a collection of databases, a digital collection of archived editions of historic newspapers preserved on microfiche, eBook downloads, Freegal Music downloads, Project Gutenberg, Freading, Britannica Online and online tutoring services through Tutor.com for those that have library membership.

The digital collection offers an online archived repository of preserved works such as Bermuda Recorder dating from 1933 (although the paper began in 1925), the Royal Gazette with editions dating from 1784, the Bermuda Sun, Mid-Ocean News, the Workers Voice which is still published, Fame Magazine and Bermuda Sports (from 1951 to 1957). In addition, they will soon offer digital editions of the Bermuda Life and Times and the Bermuda Beacon.

== Head librarians ==
- 1839-1853 John R. Stephens
- 1853-1879 Joseph Richardson
- 1879-1880 Joseph H. S. Frith
- 1880-1886 Rev. Frederick D Ward
- 1886-1912 Florentius Frith
- 1912-1940 Katherine G. Seon
- 1940-1962 A. Elsie Gosling (MBE)
- 1962-1969 Mary Gray
- 1969-1985 Mary Skiffington
- 1985-1994 Cyril O. Packwood
- 1994-1999 Grace Rawlins
- 1999-2026 Joanne Brangman

== See also ==
- List of national libraries
