= St. Peter's Church, St. George's =

Anglican church in St. George's, Bermuda

Coordinates: 32.3816°N 64.6776°W

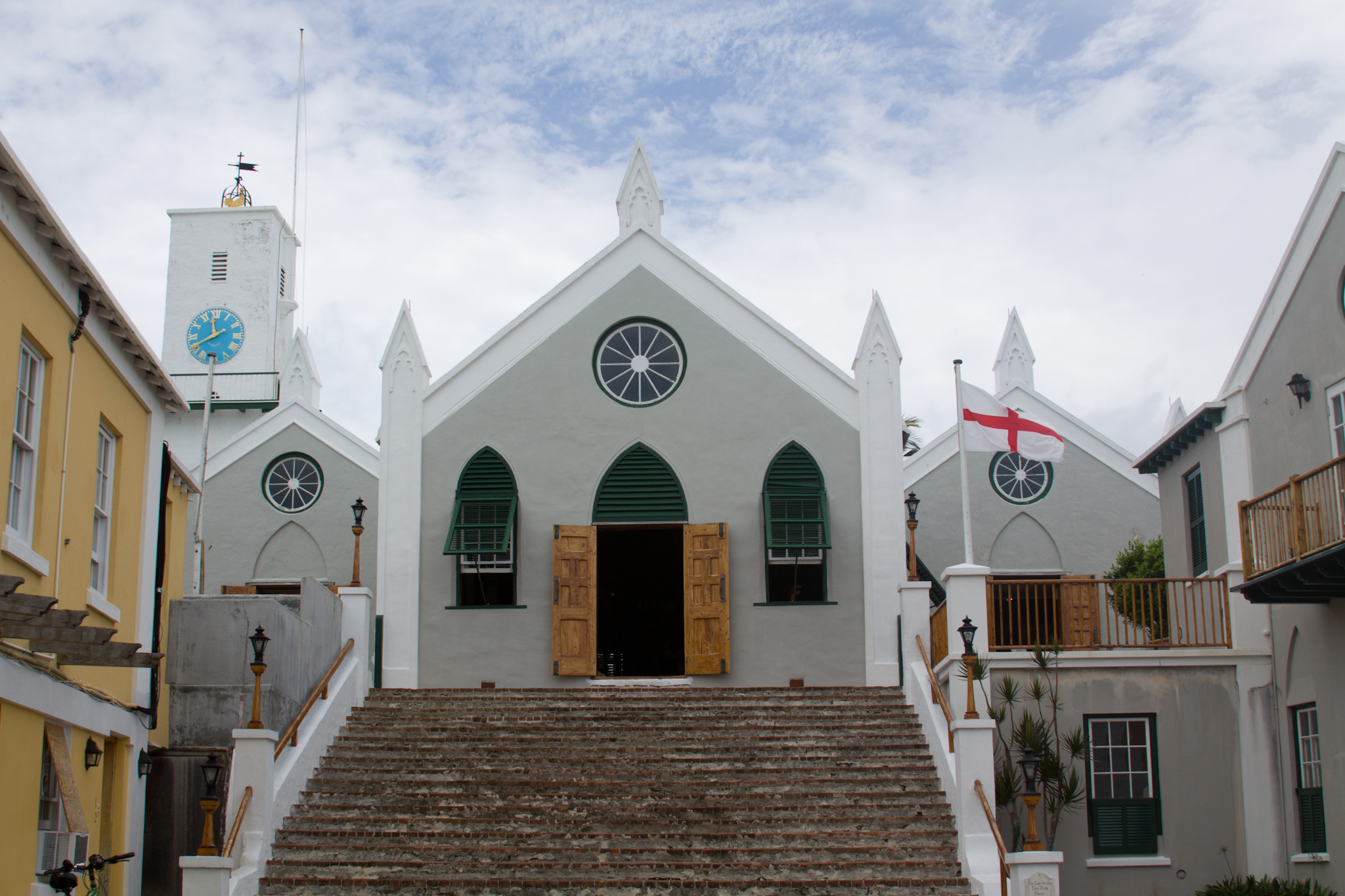
Saint Peter's Church.

Their Majesties Chappell, St. Peter's Church, in St. George's, Bermuda, is the oldest surviving Anglican church in continuous use outside the British Isles. It is also reportedly the oldest continuously used Protestant church in the New World. A UNESCO World Heritage Site (together with related fortifications), St. George's Town is the oldest surviving English settlement in the New World, having been settled by the Virginia Company in 1612 (in the aftermath of the wrecking of its flagship, the Sea Venture, in Bermuda in 1609).

== History ==
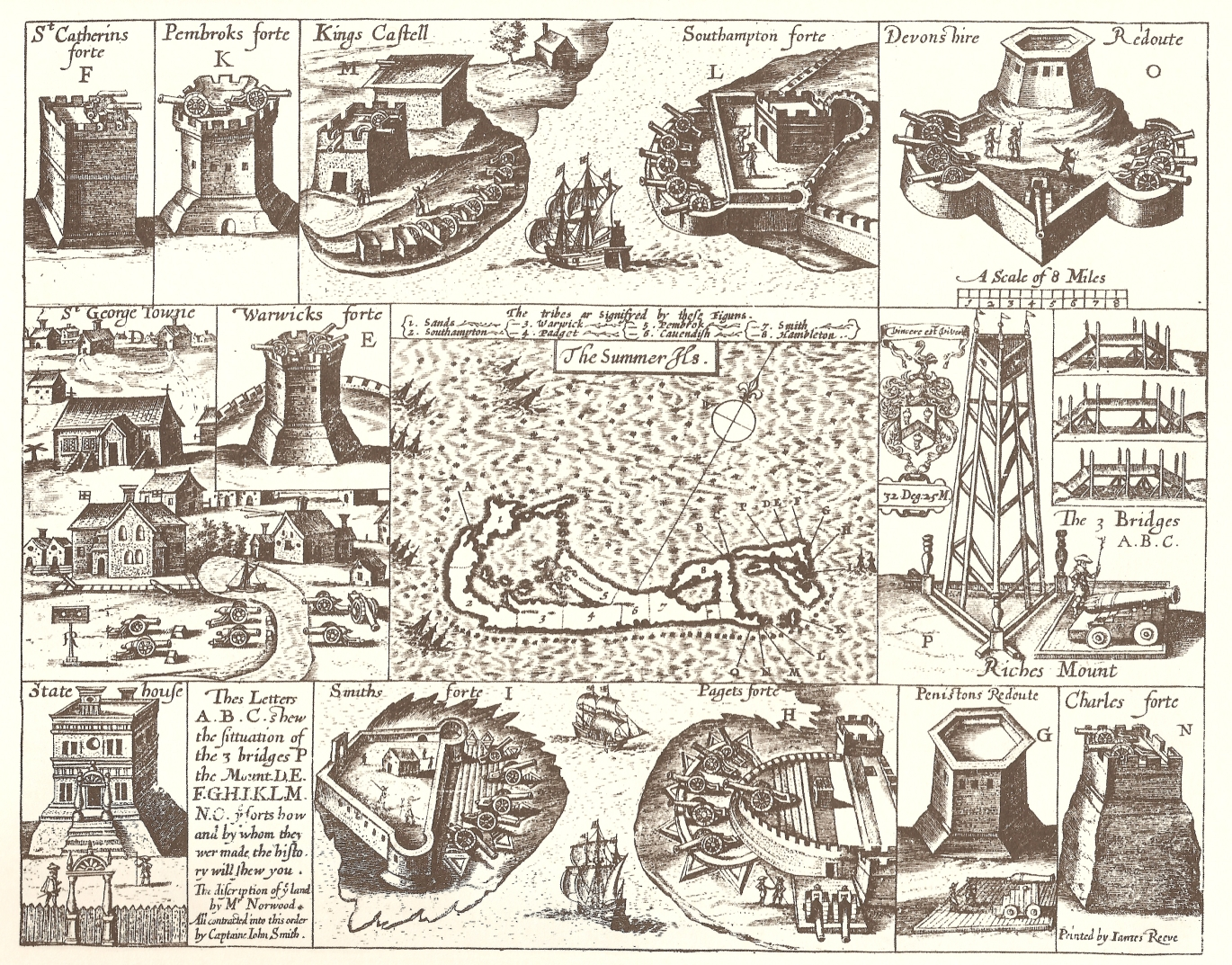
Captain John Smith's 1624 map of Bermuda, showing St. Peter's at centre, left.

The church was established immediately after the founding of the settlement, although the original building, fashioned from wood with a thatched roof, was quickly destroyed. Bermuda is famously stormy, and it was necessary to rebuild the church more than once over the following century, the final structure being of limestone walls, with a limestone slate roof lain on a framework of Bermuda cedar. The oldest parts of the current structure date to 1620, though the building has been much expanded and improved since.

2012 marks the 400th year since the founding of St. Peter's Church. It was also the Diamond Jubilee year of Her Majesty, Queen Elizabeth II. On 18 March 2012, the Queen granted St. Peter's the title Their Majesties' Chappell.

== The interior ==
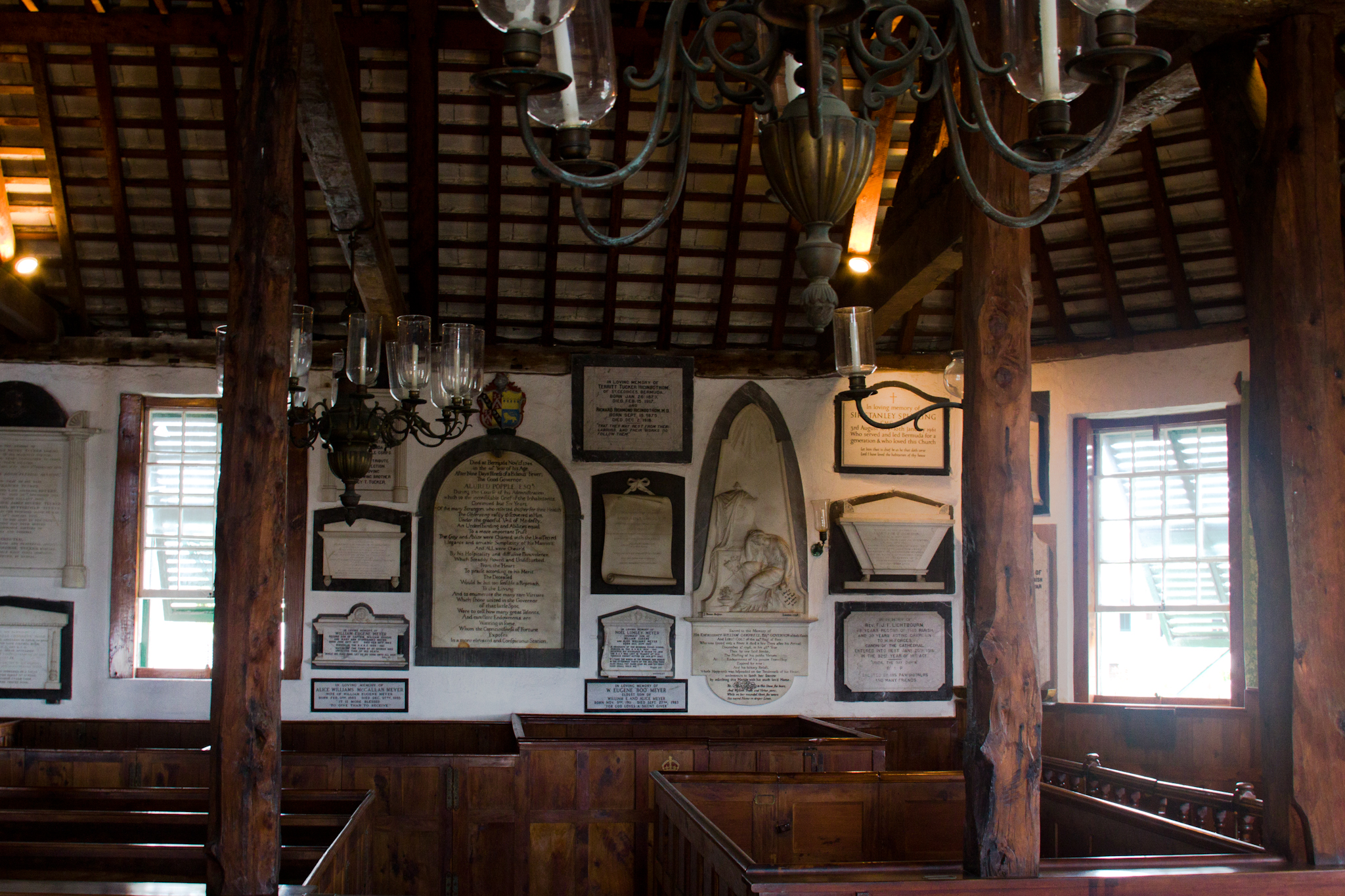
Interior of St. Peter's.

The church's interior is simple, with exposed cedar beams (prior to the blight which virtually annihilated Bermuda's cedars in the 1940s and '50s, the wood was considered inexpensive and those who could afford to favoured more expensive, imported woods. Today, the endemic wood is scarce, priceless, and proudly displayed in those homes which have it). The font of the church is 500 years old, older than the settlement of Bermuda. The walls of the church have commemorative plaques on the inside, and there are gravestones set in the outsides, those of the notables who were considered worthy enough to be buried under the church floor, such as the printer of Bermuda's first newspaper (The Bermuda Gazette), Joseph Stockdale, and Governor George James Bruere, who died in office in 1780.

== The exterior ==
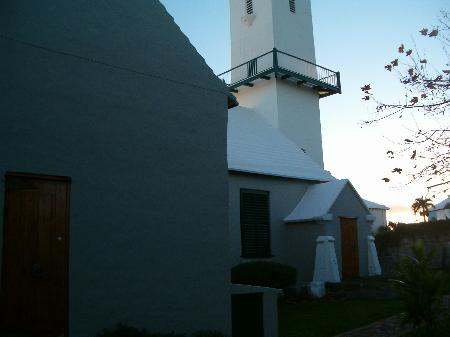
The western side of the church.

The graveyard which surrounds the church has been filled for decades, all new burials taking place in the municipal graveyard on the far shore to the north of the town. Notable exceptions were Governor Sir Richard Sharples and his aide-de-camp, Captain Hugh Sayers, who were buried side by side in the east of the churchyard after their 1973 murders. An area of the yard to the west of the church was reserved for burying slaves, prior to the 1834 emancipation of slaves throughout the British Empire.

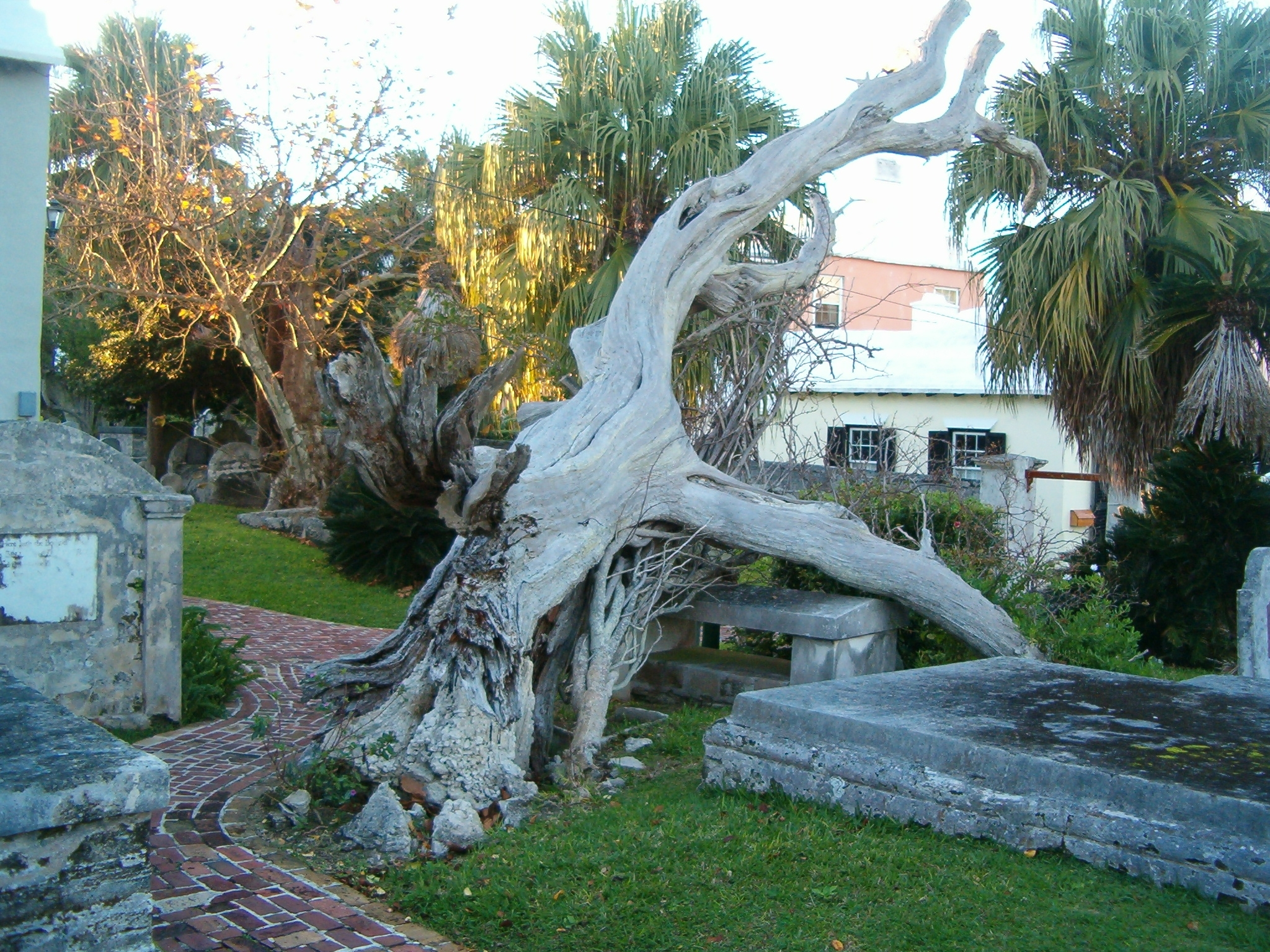
The Bermuda cedar used as a belfry when St. Peter's Church was first built was toppled by a storm in 2003.

As originally constructed, the church had no belfry, the bell being hung from an old-growth cedar directly behind the church. Although to all appearances dead, this tree was still standing until felled by Hurricane Fabian in 2003.

The south-facing church and its yard sit well back, and somewhat higher than Duke of York Street, the main road that passes through St. George's in front of it. A high, wide flight of steps descend from the church to a small yard, or square, on the north side of the road. At this east side of this yard is the church hall, a small building which was increased in size by the addition of a second floor in the 1980s.

== Parish ==
The church was established as the parish (for the town and the surrounding area) of the state church, the Church of England. A system of parishes was established throughout Bermuda, the parishes being both religious divisions, each centred on a parish church, and political ones. The January, 1620, reconstruction of St. Peter's was overseen by Governor Nathaniel Butler. When the Parliament of Bermuda was created in 1620, it first met in St. Peter's, on 1 August, pending completion of its own dedicated home, the State House. The Church of England in Bermuda became grouped with that of Newfoundland, in the 19th century, as a common bishopric. With the building of the Hamilton Cathedral in 1894 (the year it was consecrated as such – it would not be completed 'til 1905), Bermuda attained its own bishopric. Had the capital not relocated to Hamilton from St. George's (which it did in 1815), St. Peter's might have become the cathedral. There had been an attempt to replace St. Peter's in the 19th century with a larger building at a new location. Begun in 1874, this building was for various reasons never completed. Today, the magnificent ruin of the Unfinished Church, on Church Folly Lane, is a popular visitor attraction in St. George's. In 1976, the Church of England in Bermuda became the Anglican Church of Bermuda, an extra-provincial diocese under the Archbishop of Canterbury.

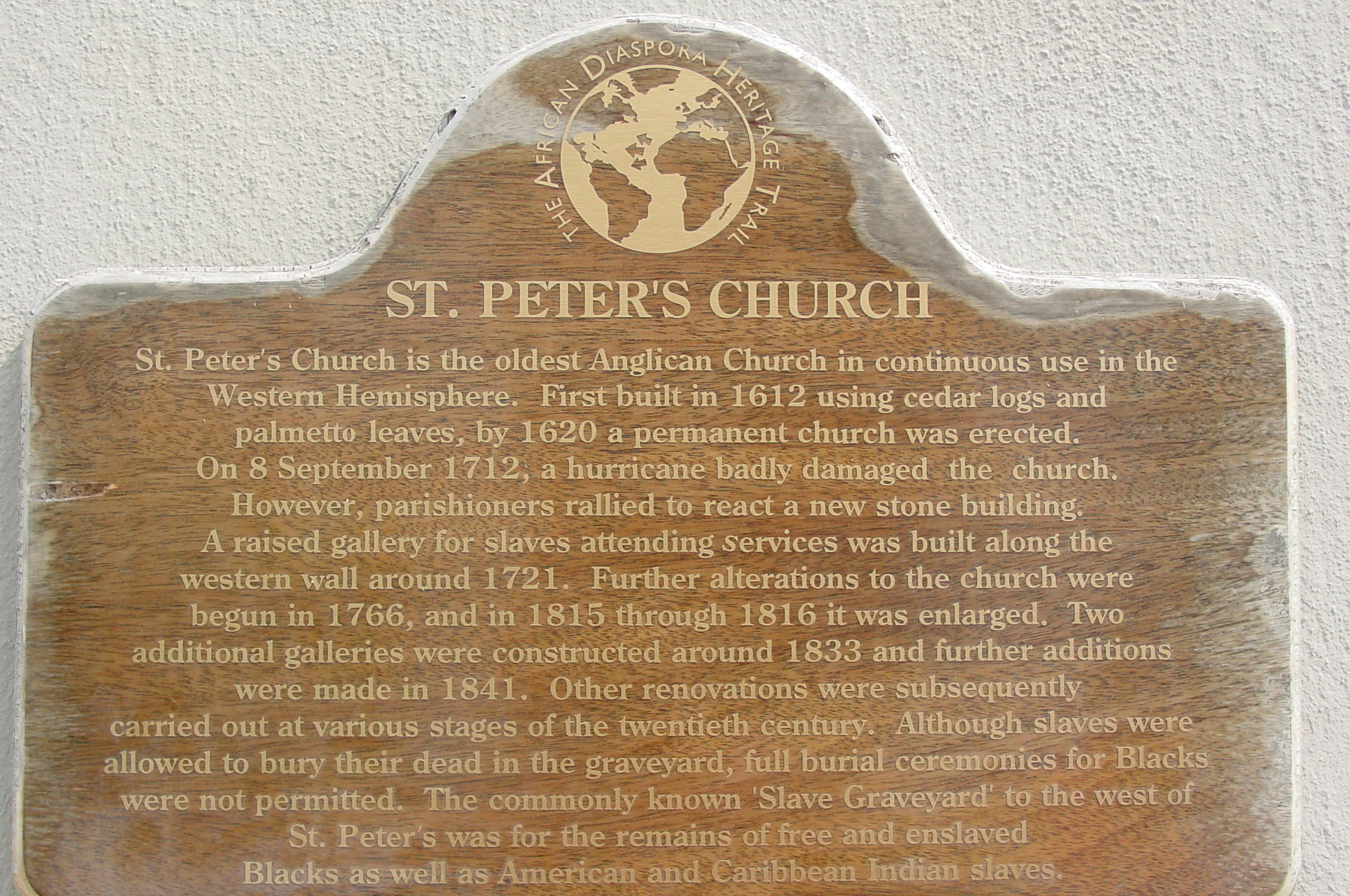
Sign describing the church

== Burials ==
- Ann Willing Bingham (1764 – 1801) - American socialite
- George James Bruere (1720/21 – 1780) - Governor of Bermuda
- Sir Peter Parker, 2nd Baronet (1785 - 1814) - English naval officer,
- Sir Richard Sharples (1916 – 1973) - British politician and Governor of Bermuda
- Joseph Stockdale (unknown - 1803) - Bermuda's first newspaper publisher
