= Gay Straight Alliance Bermuda =

Support and advocacy group

GSA Bermuda
- Founded: 2013
- Key people: Jordan Ess (Founder)
- Website: www.gsabermuda.org

The Gay Straight Alliance Bermuda (GSA Bermuda) is a support and advocacy group for persons in the lesbian, gay, bisexual, transgender and queer/questioning LGBT community. It was founded by Jordan Ess in 2013. Jordan Ess is a hedge fund Trader, Consultant, lobbying professional and Human Rights. The group was founded to address the needs of the LGBTQ community on the Island of Bermuda but it also engages in advocacy activities for persons in the LGBTQ community around the world.

== History and objectives ==
The Gay Straight Alliance Bermuda was founded on October 25, 2013. It was a break out group from the Rainbow Alliance. It branched out to get more work done as a result of enough not being done by the rainbow alliance. It was set up primarily as a lobby group, sending out emails and letters and publishing articles in order to influence policies and public opinion. It has a blog which is run by the founder Jordan Ess which he uses to promote the group’s activities.

The organization is a volunteer-driven network for members of the LGBTQ community and for all other persons being discriminated against in any way. It has a large presence of non-gay volunteers and anonymous financial partners.

== Current and recent issues ==
=== Hotline dedicated to persons in the LGBTQ community ===
In response to a 2016 article written by the Royal Gazette, the need for support services for young person’s dealing with sexual identity issues in Bermuda was addressed, the Gay Straight Alliance Bermuda have set plans in motion to set up a telephone hotline to help young people dealing with sexual identity issues in Bermuda. In an interview with the Royal Gazette, GSA founder Jordan Ess said: “There are sufficient crisis services available on the island to meet demand. Our goal in creating a help desk for LGBTQ youth, especially, is to deal not with emergency situations but with coping skills and life strategies to handle issues that LGBTQ youth may face, like parental disapproval, discrimination and bullying”. “Other people who may be concerned or dealing with their child being LGBTQ or simply other people in the community [will be] welcome to call as well on LGBTQ-related matters.”

=== Advocacy for same-sex marriage ===
On February 9, 2016, members of the LGBTQ community came to stand against hundreds of members of Preserve Marriage, a group dedicated to preserving the virtues of traditional marriage held a demonstration on the grounds of the Cabinet Building of the government of Bermuda where they submitted their objectives against civil unions and same-sex marriage. The major goal of their protest was to oppose the rights of same-sex couples to raise kids. Jordan Ess, founder of the Gay Straight Alliance Bermuda was also present to lend support to the LGBTQ community. Saying, “I am for every human being having human rights”.

=== Governmental and public response to gay rights in Bermuda ===
In 1944, homosexuality was decriminalized by the government of Bermuda but since then, no further action has been taken to prevent discrimination of persons in this group with discrimination based on gender identity issues not criminalized

On recent response to gay rights, the Bermudian parliament recently called for a referendum on the marriage rights of persons in the LGBTQ community and with a poll conducted by the Royal Gazette in 2015 showing that 44% of Bermudans were against same-sex marriage and 48% for it, it leaves one guessing as to what will be the result of the referendum due to be debated on in a few weeks.

== Challenges ==
Amongst the challenges being encountered by the gay straight alliance Bermuda include insufficient staff strength and funds to carry out some of their activities.
