= Featherbed Alley Printshop =

Museum of Bermudan newspaper and printing businesses

Coordinates: 32°22′56″N 64°40′36″W

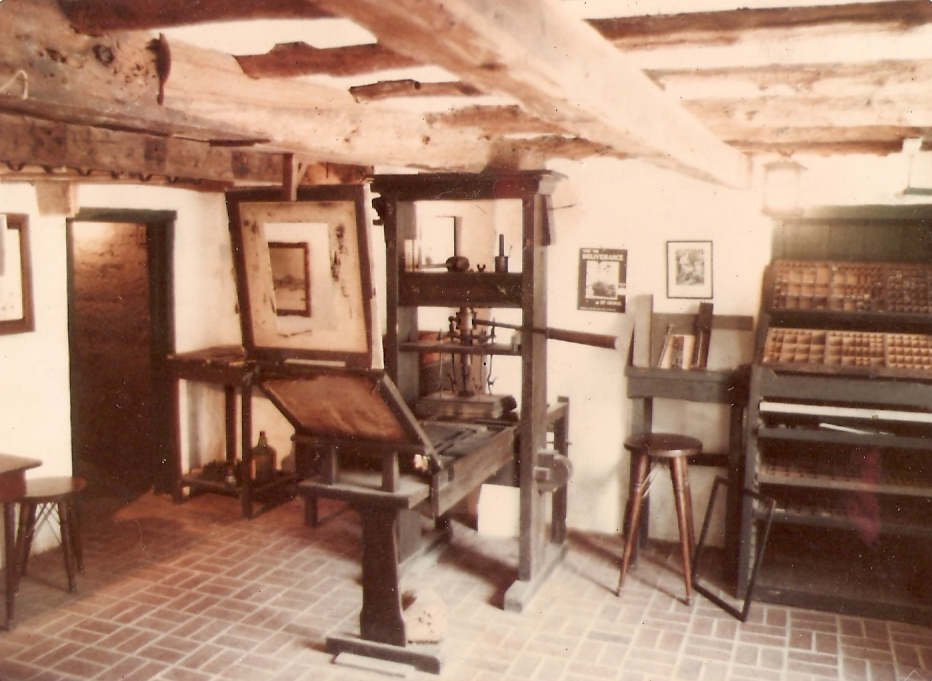
The Featherbed Alley Printshop Museum

The Featherbed Alley Printshop is a museum featuring a replica Gutenberg press, and is located in the lower level of the Mitchell House, in St. George's, a UNESCO World Heritage town in Bermuda. The upper level of the house holds the St. George's Historical Society Museum. The house is named for its architect, Walter Mitchell, who had it built in the 1720s. The museum is a replica of an 18th-century printshop, though its location was never formerly the site of such a business (it occupies the former servants' quarters of the Mitchell House). The museum is largely dedicated to the history of Bermuda's first newspaper and printing business, that of Joseph Stockdale, who published The Bermuda Gazette. Stockdale actually operated his business from the cellar of his own house, the Stockdale House, on Printer's Alley (currently a private home, belonging to present-day newspaperman Lt. Col. Gavin Shorto). Following his death, Stockdale's heirs continued to run operate the business from Stockdale House until relocating to Hamilton, Bermuda, following the capital's move there in 1815 (this led to a petition against the gazette, and the cancellation of subscriptions by many in St. George's, resulting in the closure of the newspaper).

The Featherbed Alley Printshop was created, and is operated, by the Department of Tourism (DOT) of the Government of Bermuda. The Gutenberg press was obtained from a local printing business which had imported it some years earlier. Throughout the Nineteen-Eighties, the Curator of the museum was Major Donald Henry 'Bob' Burns, MC, famous also as the town crier of St. George's, and holder of the Guinness Book of World Records record for the loudest human speaking voice.
