= List of newspapers in Bermuda =

This is a list of newspapers in Bermuda.

- Bernews (Hamilton, Bermuda) (web only, began publication in 2010)
- The Royal Gazette (Hamilton, Bermuda) (daily print and web, began publication in 1828)
- Workers' Voice (published by Bermuda Industrial Union), (Hamilton, Bermuda)

The following were previously published:

- The Bermuda Gazette (published from 1784 to 1816) (St. George's, Bermuda)
- Bermuda Sun (bi-weekly, published from 1964 to 2014) (Hamilton, Bermuda)
- Mid-Ocean News (published from 1911 to 2009) (Hamilton, Bermuda)

== See also ==
- Lists of newspapers
