= William Reid (British Army officer) =

British Army general

Major-General Sir William Reid GCMG KCB FRS
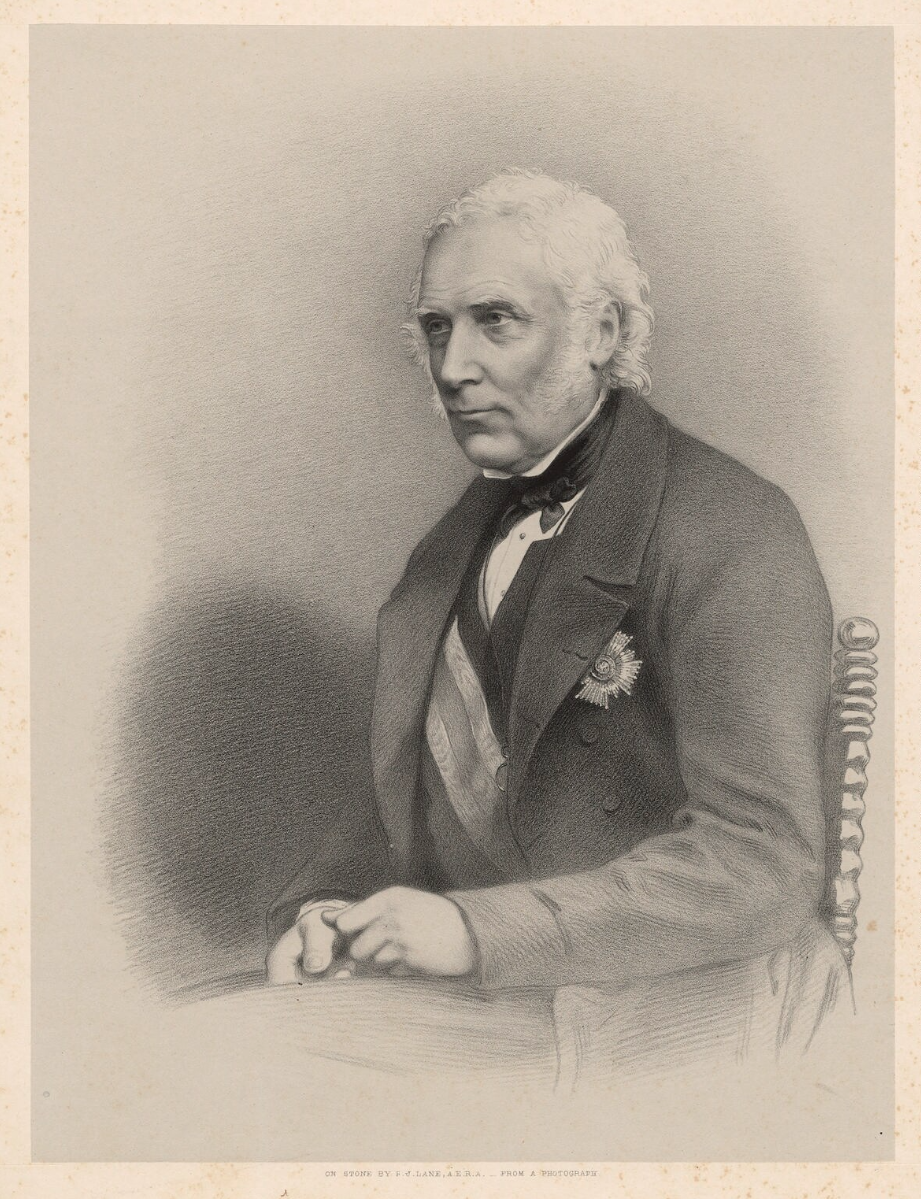
- Lithograph by Richard James Lane, 1859
- Born: 25 April 1791; Kinglassie, Fife, Scotland
- Died: 31 October 1858 (aged 67); London, England
- Military career
- Allegiance: United Kingdom
- Branch: Board of Ordnance
- Service years: 1809–
- Rank: Major-General
- Service number: 419
- Unit: Corps of Royal Engineers
- Conflicts: Peninsular War; War of 1812; Battle of New Orleans; Bombardment of Algiers; First Carlist War
- Awards: Knight Grand Cross of the Order of St Michael and St George; Knight Commander of the Order of the Bath

Major-General Sir William Reid GCMG KCB FRS (25 April 1791 – 31 October 1858) was a Scottish military engineer, administrator and meteorologist. He was Governor of the Bermudas (1839–1846), of the British Windward Islands (1846–1848), and of Malta (1851–1858). Reid founded the Bermuda National Library in 1839.

== Early life and education ==
William Reid was born on 25 April 1791 at Kinglassie, Fife, the fifth child and eldest son of James Reid, minister of the Church of Scotland at Kinglassie, and his wife, Alexandrina, daughter of Thomas Fyers, chief engineer in Scotland. He was educated at a private school in Musselburgh. In 1806 he was admitted to the Royal Military Academy, Woolwich.

== Military career ==
Reid was commissioned in the Corps of Royal Engineers, Board of Ordnance, as no. 419, with the rank of second lieutenant on 10 February 1809, promoted first lieutenant on 23 April 1810, whereupon he joined Wellington's army at Lisbon. From 1810 to 1814 he served with the British army in the Peninsular War. He returned to England in 1814 and was promoted second captain on 20 December. In 1815 he served in the latter stages of the Anglo-American War including participating in Sir Edward Pakenham's unsuccessful attack on New Orleans. In 1816 he returned to Woolwich to become adjutant of the Royal Sappers and Miners and in the same year he accompanied the expedition against Algiers under Lord Exmouth. From 1819 to 1824 he was on half pay. Between 1824 and 1827 Reid served with the Ordnance Survey in Ireland then without employment until on 28 January 1829 he was promoted regimental first captain and sent to Exeter to quell the reform riots.

Reid was in the Leeward Islands in 1831 to direct the task of reconstruction after the Great Barbados hurricane and in Barbados saw at firsthand the destructive power of storms. He became interested in hurricanes, which were at the time a matter of intense scientific controversy. During his two-and-a-half-year stay he became absorbed in trying to understand the nature of North Atlantic hurricanes, which led to a lifelong study of tropical storms. In 1835 Reid commanded a brigade in the British Legion raised by the Queen Regent of Spain. In 1837 he was promoted lieutenant-colonel and was stationed from then until 1839 in Portsmouth. In England, Reid presented scientific ideas he had developed with William Redfield studying storm data before the British Association for the Advancement of Science in 1838 to great acclaim. In the same year Reid published his "An Attempt to Develop the Law of Storms by Means of Facts". For this he was appointed Companion of the Order of the Bath in 1838 and was elected a Fellow of the Royal Society in 1839. Reid published a second book in 1849, "Progress of the Development of the Law of Storms", and in that year became vice-president of the Royal Society. He was promoted colonel on 11 November 1851 and major-general 30 May 1856.

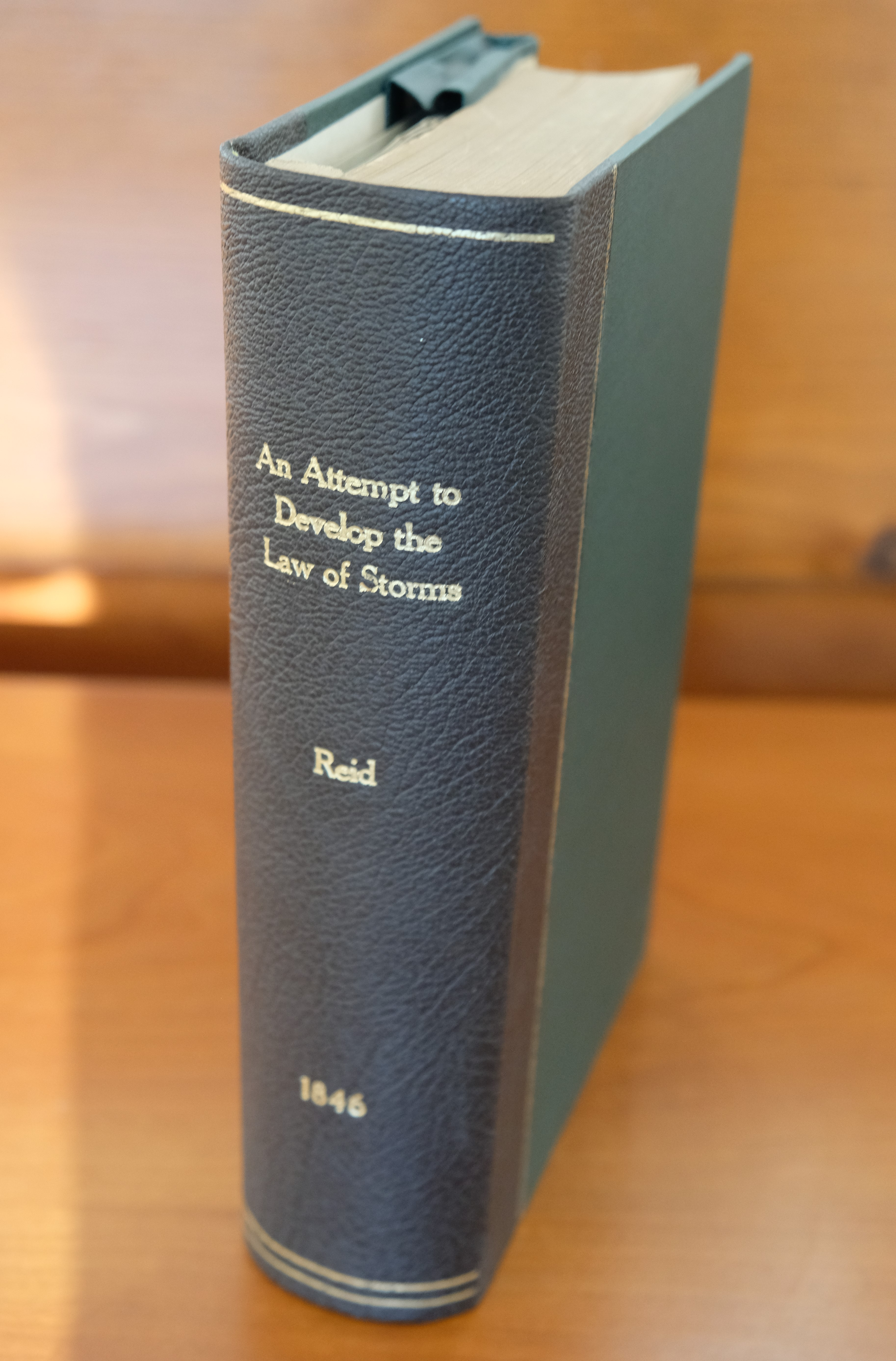
Reid's An Attempt to Develop the Law of Storms by Means of Facts (1846)

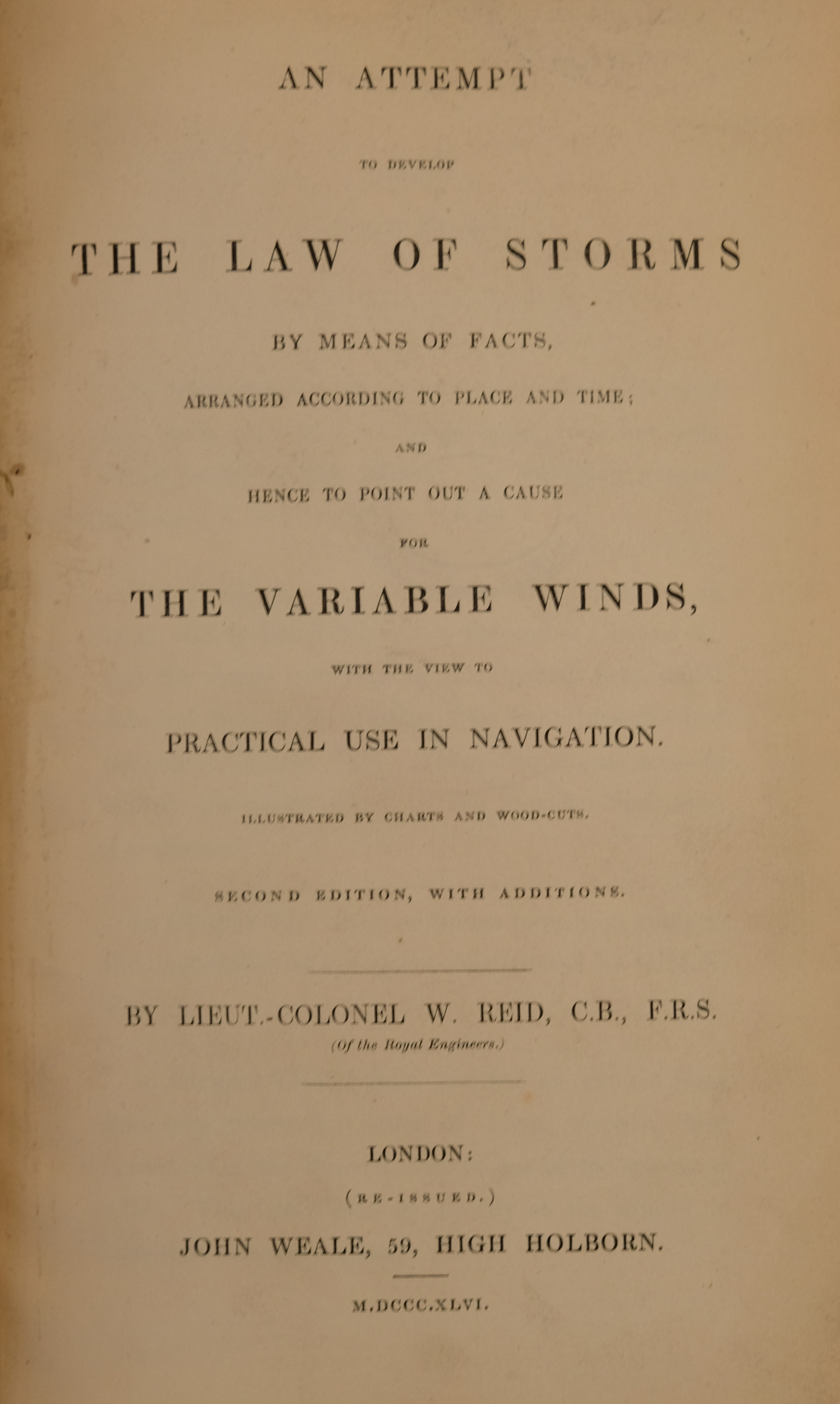
Title page to An Attempt to Develop the Law of Storms by Means of Facts (1846)

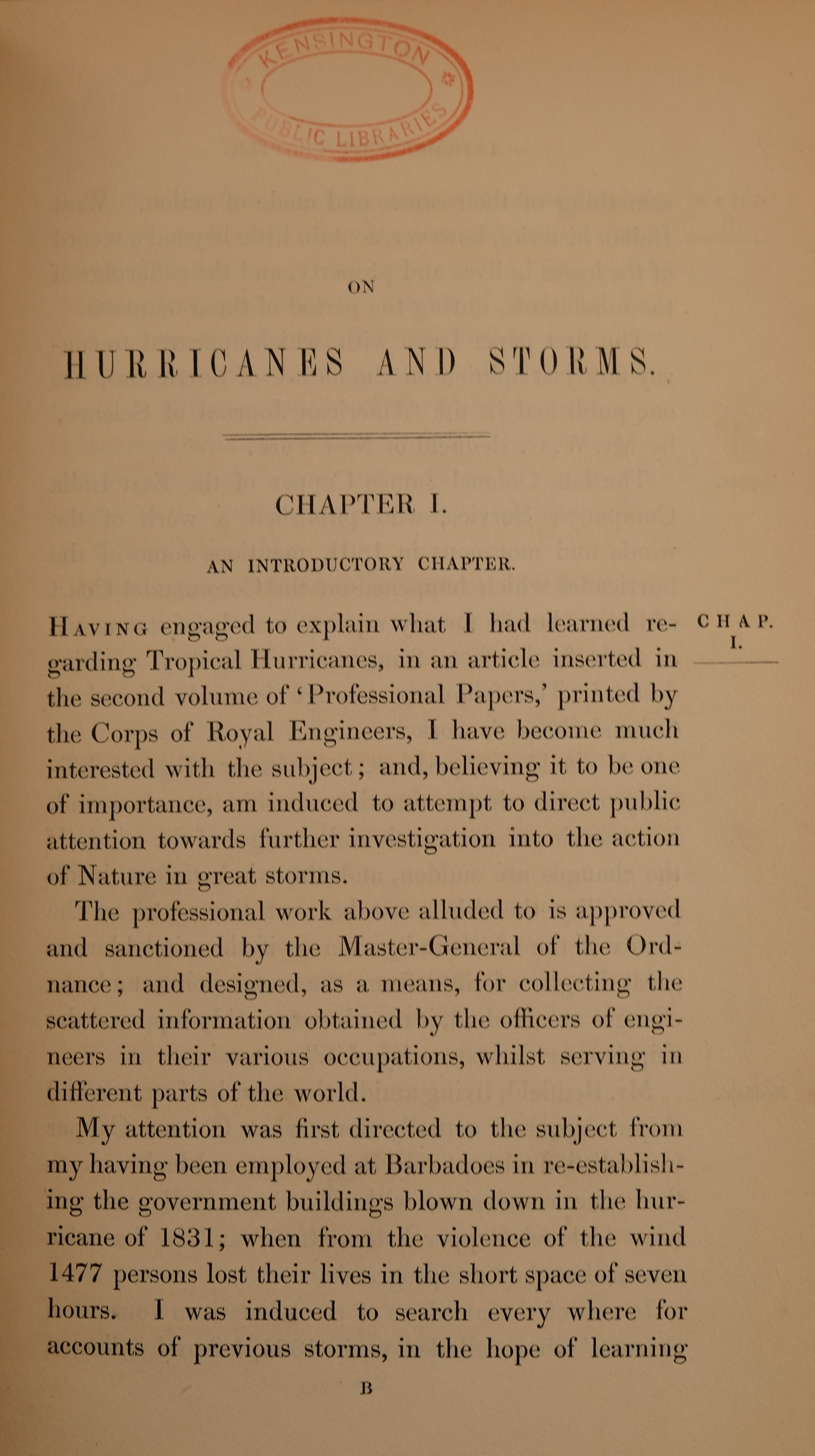
First page to An Attempt to Develop the Law of Storms by Means of Facts (1846)

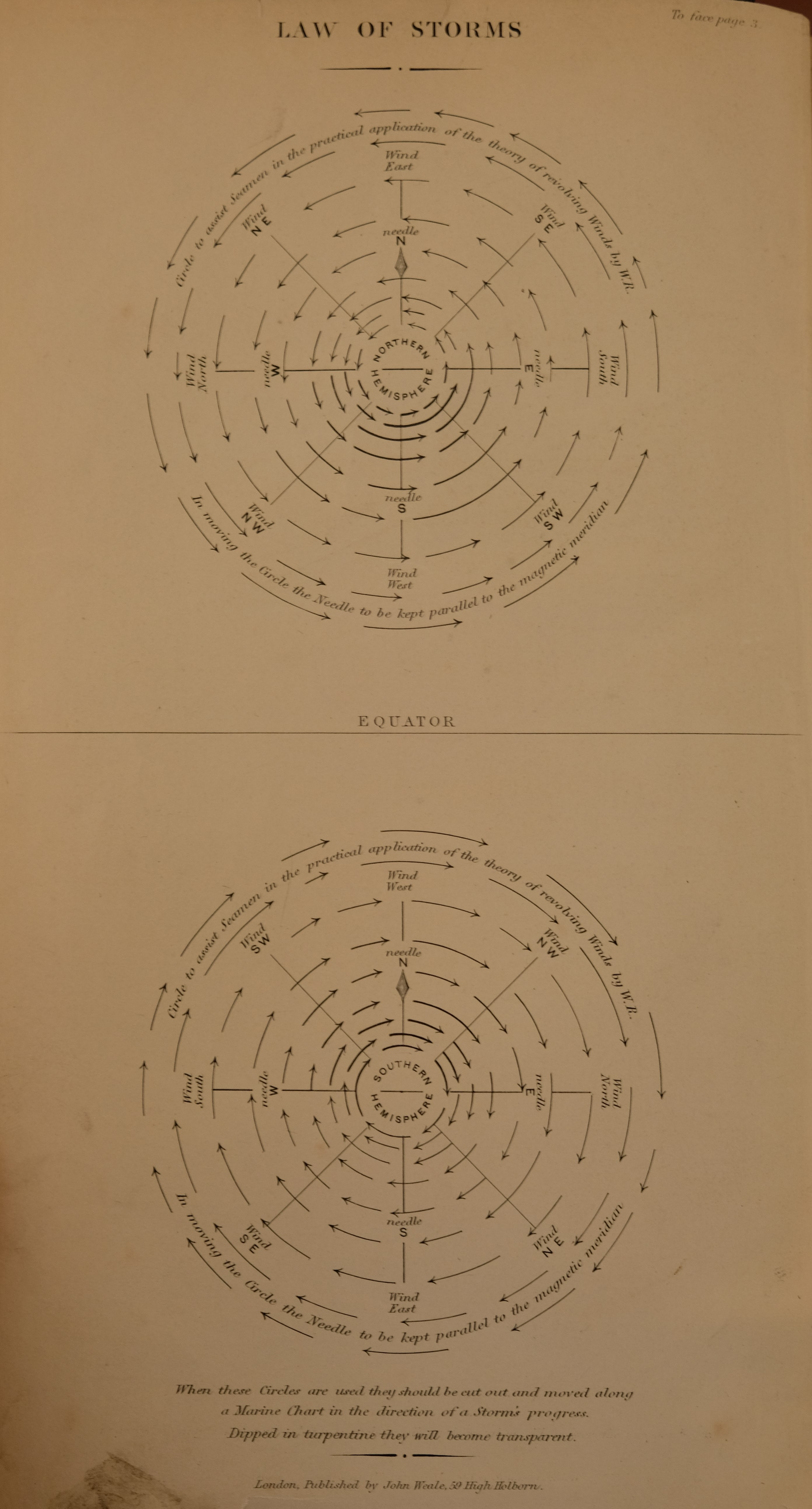
Figure from An Attempt to Develop the Law of Storms by Means of Facts (1846)

== Administrator ==
From 1839 to 1846 Reid was civil Governor and military Commander-in-Chief of the Imperial fortress of Bermuda, then Governor-in-Chief of the British Windward Islands (1846–1848), and Governor and Commander-in-Chief of the Imperial fortress of Malta (1851–1858). He returned to England to become Commanding Royal Engineer at Woolwich, and in 1850–51 chaired the executive committee of the Great Exhibition, being awarded Knight Commander of the Order of the Bath in recognition of his chairmanship in 1851.

Reid was a member of the Institution of Civil Engineers and of learned societies of many countries. He was elected a Fellow of the Royal Society in February 1839.

== Legacy ==
Reid is now chiefly remembered for his contribution to the intense debate on storms which dominated meteorology in the first half of the nineteenth century. He is also remembered as a successful governor, genuinely concerned with the well-being of those he was sent to govern.

== Personal life ==
On 5 November 1818 at Clapham, Surrey, Reid married Sarah, youngest daughter of John Bolland, hop merchant and Member of Parliament for Bletchingley (UK Parliament constituency), Surrey. They had five daughters.

== Death ==
Reid returned to England from Malta in 1858. He died aged 67 after a short illness at his home, 117 Gloucester Terrace, Hyde Park, London on 31 October 1858. His wife had died on 19 February 1858. Their five daughters survived them.

== Family ==
His daughter, Grace Reid, married Basil Simouth de Ros Hall, son of Basil Hall.

His daughter Charlotte Cuyler Reid married General Sir Neville Chamberlain.

His daughter Sophia Reid married Lieutenant-Colonel Edmund Hallewell, the son of Edmund Gilling Hallewell MP.

== Published works ==
- An Attempt to Develop the Law of Storms by Means of Facts (1838 1st ed. 1841 2nd ed. 1850 3rd ed.)
- The Progress of the Development of the Law of Storms (1849)

== Sources ==
- Mount Carmel Hospital Main Gate
- The Bermudian
- "Reid, William (1791-1858)" . Dictionary of National Biography. London: Smith, Elder & Co. 1885–1900.

Government offices
Preceded by Sir R. S. Chapman	Governor of Bermuda; 1839–1846	Succeeded by W. N. Hutchinson
Preceded by Sir Charles Edward Grey	Governor of Barbados and the Windward Islands; 1846–1848	Succeeded by William MacBean George Colebrooke
Preceded by Richard More O'Ferrall	Governor of Malta; 1851–1858	Succeeded by Sir John Le Marchant
