= Joseph Stockdale =

First newspaper publisher in Bermuda

Joseph Stockdale (died 10 October 1803) was the publisher of Bermuda's first newspaper, The Bermuda Gazette, a Bermudian English-language weekly newspaper. It was published from 1784 to 1803 by Stockdale (and by his three daughters from 1803 to 1816); In 1782, the Bermudian Legislature arranged for a printing press, and brought Stockdale from England to run it. He had been given financial incentive to move to Bermuda with his family and establish the newspaper.

Stockdale also provided other printing services and operated Bermuda's first local postal service. The Bermuda Gazette was sold by subscription and delivered to subscribers, with Stockdale's employee also delivering mail for a fee.

He died on 10 October 1803, and is buried inside St. Peter's Church, St. George's.

== Commemoration ==
Joseph Stockdale and the newspaper were honoured on Bermuda stamps in 1984 on the 200th anniversary of Bermuda's postal service and newspaper.

== See also ==
- List of newspapers in Bermuda
- Featherbed Alley Printshop
