= The Royal Gazette (Bermuda) =

Bermudian English-language daily newspaper

- Front page of the Royal Gazette, 24 February 2004
- Type: Daily newspaper (not published on Sundays or public holidays)
- Owner: The Bermuda Press (Holdings) Ltd. (BSX: BPH.BH)
- Editor: William J.S. Zuill
- Founded: 1828
- Language: English
- Headquarters: Hamilton, Bermuda
- Circulation: 14,578 copies (last audited November 2007)
- OCLC number: 36836340
- Website: royalgazette.com

The Royal Gazette is a Bermudian, English-language daily newspaper. Founded in 1828, it is Bermuda's only daily newspaper (not published on Sundays and public holidays).

== History ==
The first issues of The Royal Gazette, Bermuda Commercial and General Advertiser and Recorder were published in January 1828. The company bore no relation to an earlier publication named The Bermuda Gazette and Weekly Advertiser founded by Joseph Stockdale in 1782 nor an earlier Royal Gazette founded by Mr Edmund Ward in 1809.

Its founder Donald MacPhee Lee, an immigrant to Bermuda from Prince Edward Island in Canada, served as editor until his death in 1883, whereupon it was operated by his son and later his daughter. Part commercial printer and part newspaper, the company acquired its Royal title serving as the 'King's Printer' in Bermuda and as publisher of official notices.

The first issue of The Royal Gazette included a statement that "The pages of the Royal Gazette will never be profaned by the scandals of private malice or the bitterness of party contention; but will be devoted to extracts from the most approved literature of the day and to the best original compositions that can be obtained within the Colony."

From 1900 the paper was published twice a week. The Royal Gazette Company Limited was formed after the newspaper was bought by Mr John Foggo Eve from the Lee family in 1904. Following an amalgamation with the competing Colonist newspaper in 1921, The Royal Gazette and Colonist Daily became a daily newspaper. The name was shortened to The Royal Gazette in 1947.

A Sunday edition was started in 1948, which continued until the competing afternoon daily Mid-Ocean News was purchased in 1962 and reduced to a weekly in 1968. The Mid-Ocean News eventually ceased publication in October 2009.

== Editors ==
- Donald MacPhee Lee from 1828
- Gregory Vose Lee from 1883
- Roseannie Lee Heyl from 1898
- John Foggo Eve from 1904
- A.M. Purcell from 1921
- E.T. Sayer from 1939
- William S. Zuill from 1969
- W.E. Hopwood from 1972
- David L. White from 1976
- William J.S. Zuill from 1998 to 2012, followed by consultant editors Jeremy Deacon and Tim Hodgson
- Dexter Smith from 2015 to 2025
- William J.S. Zuill from 2026

== Ownership ==
The Royal Gazette is owned by The Bermuda Press (Holdings) Ltd which is a publicly traded company on the Bermuda Stock Exchange.

== Legal Cases for Freedom of Expression in Bermuda ==
The Royal Gazette has been the protagonist in several legal cases protecting freedom of expression and independent/free press in Bermuda.

- Hector -v- The Royal Gazette Ltd., Civil Jurisdiction 1980: No. 56 (Ruling dated 3 April 1980) which alleged libel arising from the publication of correspondence that made accusations regarding a magistrate.
- Hall -v- White and Royal Gazette Ltd., Civil Jurisdiction 1993 No. 86 (Ruling dated 2 April 1993) where a lawyer sued the newspaper for publishing transcripts involving a defendant ultimately jailed for his role in a drug-smuggling ring. A gag order was obtained at a hearing at which the newspaper was absent. The newspaper successfully contested the injunction on the basis that the transcripts were part of a public record.
- Ewart F. Brown -v- Bermuda Press (Holdings) Limited, Civil Jurisdiction 2007: No. 196 (Ruling dated 6 November 2007) which sought to suppress the publication of articles relating to an alleged Bermuda Police Service investigation into the affairs of the Bermuda Housing Corporation. The ultimate decision by the Privy Council affirmed the principle that the media cannot be prevented from publishing news that is in the public interest, even if that news may later be challenged through a libel action later on.
- Her Majesty's Attorney General -v- Bermuda Press (Holdings) Limited, Civil Jurisdiction 2009: No. 435 (Ruling dated 18 December 2009) in which the Bermuda Attorney-General obtained a temporary injunction against newspaper to prevent it publishing a leaked memorandum about a secret real estate proposed transaction involving the Government.
- Bermuda Press (Holdings) Limited -v- Registrar of the Supreme Court, Civil Jurisdiction 2015: No. 307 (Ruling dated 24 July 2015) in which the newspaper sought to publish affidavits that were sworn into evidence during a legal dispute over a real estate development involving the Bermuda Government. The ruling allowed the newspaper to have unprecedented access to the sworn affirmations relating to the controversial development deal, which was the subject of significant litigation in Bermuda and elsewhere.
- Evatt Anthony Tamine -v- Bermuda Press (Holdings) Limited, Civil Jurisdiction 2021: No. 303 (Ruling dated 24 January 2022) in which an injunction sought to suppress coverage by the newspaper of an affidavit that was referenced in a sealed proceeding of the Bermuda Supreme Court but was later made publicly available as part of court proceedings in the United States related to the largest-ever tax fraud prosecution brought against an individual in the U.S.

== See also ==
- List of newspapers in Bermuda
