= State House, Bermuda =

17th-century parliament building in St. George's, Bermuda

Coordinates: 32°22′53″N 64°40′33″W

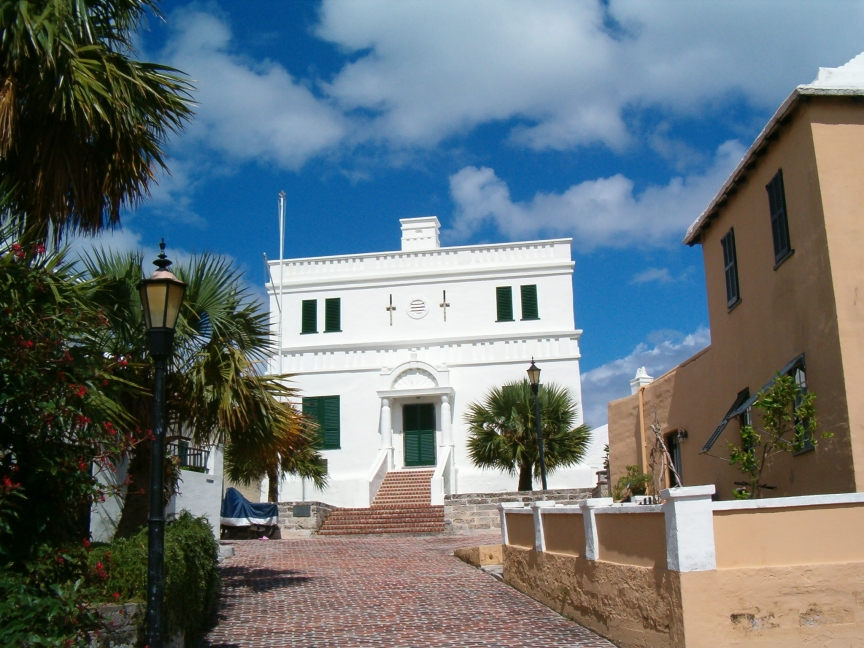
The State House, the home of Bermuda's parliament in St. George's from 1620 until the capital's relocation to Hamilton in 1815. Picture taken in 2006

The State House (1620) in St. George's was the first purpose-built home of the House of Assembly, which then constituted the only chamber of the Parliament of Bermuda. Other than fortifications, it was Bermuda's first stone building. It is the oldest surviving Bermudian building, again excepting some fortifications, and has been used since 1815 as a Masonic lodge.

Bermuda was settled, unintentionally, in 1609, by the Virginia Company, when its flagship Sea Venture was driven onto the reefs off St. George's Island to prevent her foundering. The survivors, 150 human settlers and crew members and one dog, spent most of the next year on St. George's, before most resumed their voyage to Jamestown, Virginia in two newly constructed ships Deliverance and Patience. The archipelago was officially settled in 1612, when the Virginia Company's Third Charter extended the boundaries of Virginia far enough across the Atlantic to include Bermuda. Settlers and Governor Richard Moore arrived that year aboard Plough to join the three men left behind in 1610. After a brief period on neighbouring Smith's Island, where they found the original three, the settlers moved to St. George's where they founded the town of New London (soon renamed St. George's, like the island). The Virginia Company created a system of government that included the appointed Governor and an elected House Assembly, which held its first session in 1620 (the first assembly having been created in 1619). With no premises of its own, the House of Assembly originally met in St. Peter's Church (the oldest Anglican church outside of the British Isles, having originally been built in 1612, though storms required it to be subsequently rebuilt on several occasions). A purpose-built home was created for the House of Assembly in 1620.

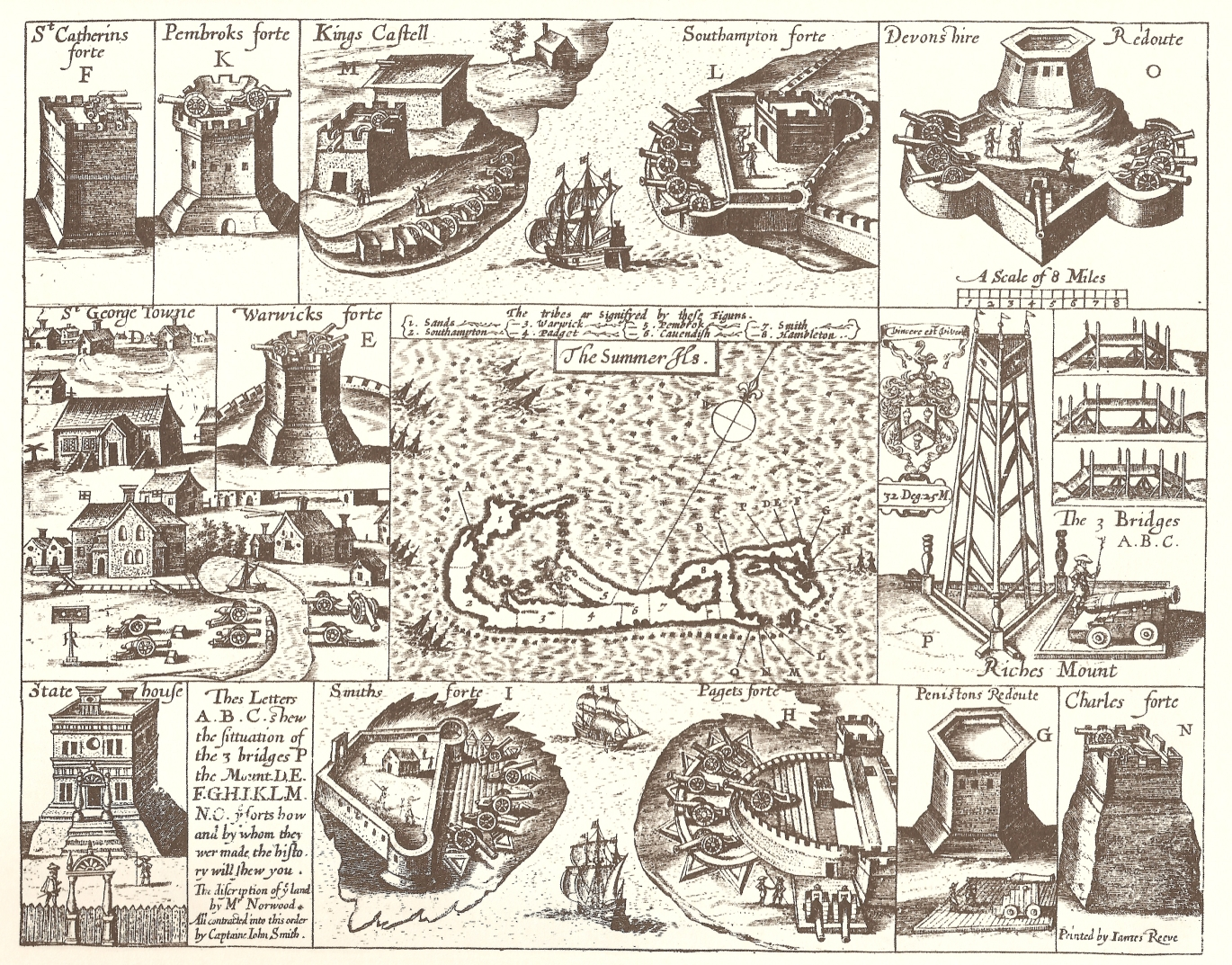
Captain John Smith's 1624 map of Bermuda, showing contemporary fortifications and the State House.

The State House was built along Italian lines, due, reportedly, to then-Governor Nathaniel Butler's conviction that Bermuda shared the same latitude and climate. In fact, Bermuda's Oceanic climate features drastically more rainfall than the Mediterranean climate, and the State House's flat roof proved to be a problem, with many years being spent solving the tendency of water to pool on, and seep through, its porous limestone. The State House was Bermuda's first stone building (other than the open walls of fortifications), but subsequent Bermudian buildings did not follow its design; what became typical Bermudian architecture incorporated stone walls, topped with angled, slate roofs, all made from the local limestone sandstone. The angled roofs were used as a water catchment, and directed the rainfall into gutters leading to tanks, or cisterns.

The State House housed Bermuda's Parliament from 1620 until 1815, when the capital was relocated to the City of Hamilton. Since then, the State House has been leased to the brethren of Lodge St. George No. 200 G.R.S. The token annual rent paid to the Government for the property is one peppercorn. The payment of this peppercorn has developed into an elaborate ceremony involving the Governor and the military.

The State House was one of the sites (the others mostly being military) illustrated on a map of Bermuda (shown at left) published in The Generall Historie of Virginia, New-England, and the Summer Isles, by Captain John Smith in 1624.

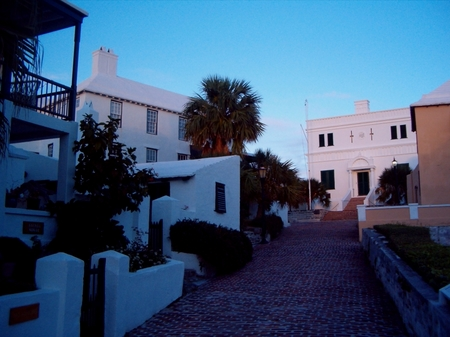
View of the State House from the bottom of King's street

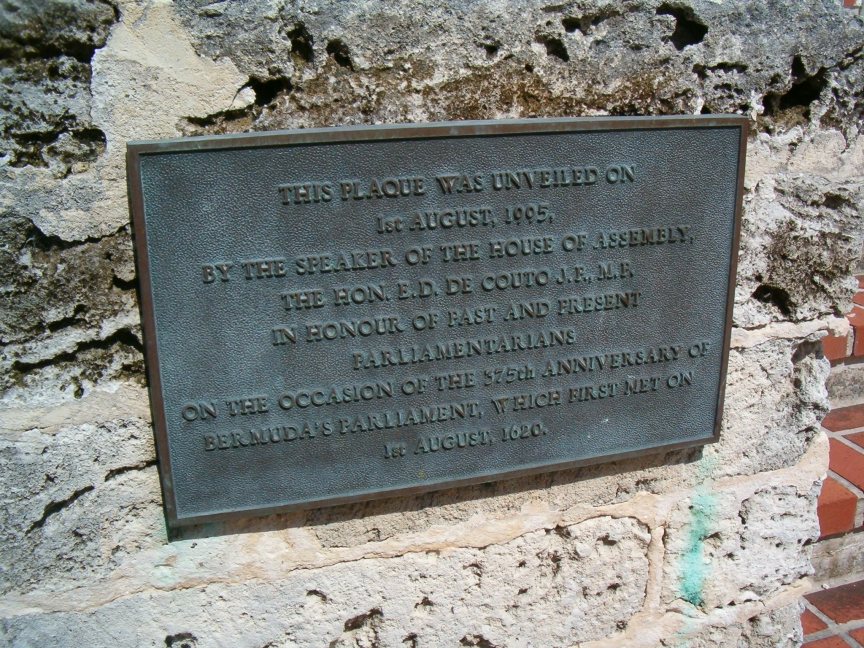
375 Anniversary Plaque of Bermuda Parliament, placed at State House in 1995

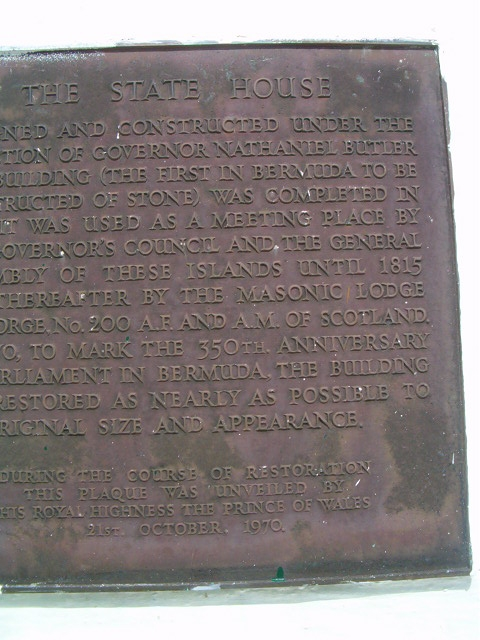
Plaque on the wall of the State House

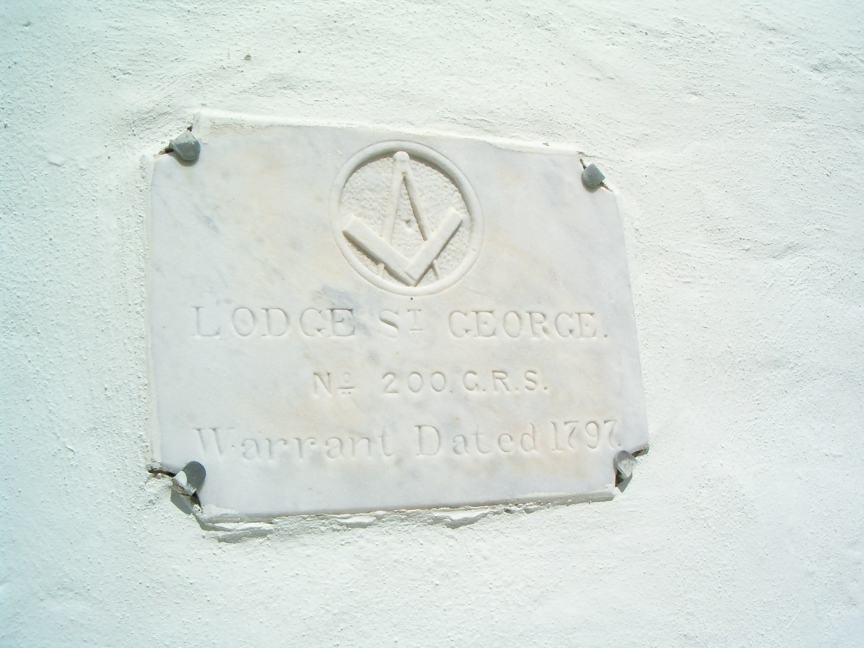
Plaque of the Masonic Lodge which has been housed in the State House since 1815
