= The Bermuda Gazette =

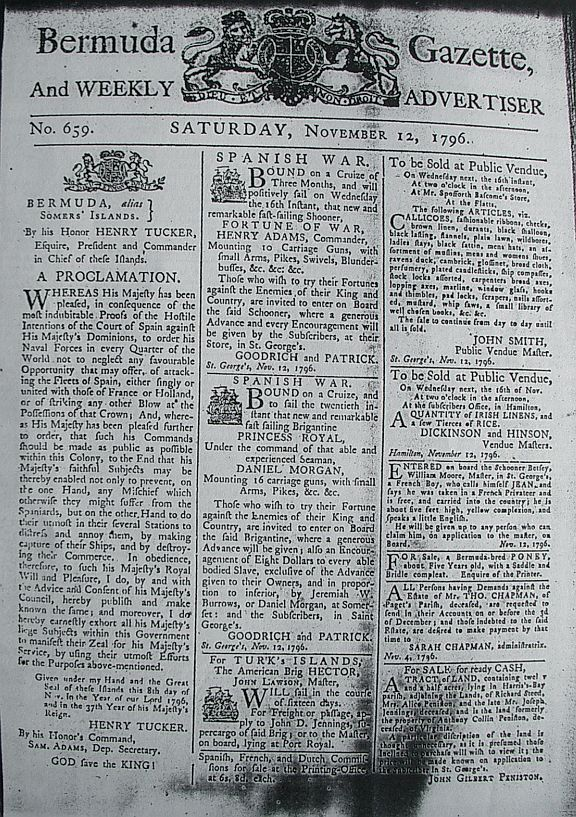
- The Bermuda Gazette of 12 November 1796
- Type: Weekly newspaper
- Publisher: Joseph Stockdale
- Editor: Joseph Stockdale
- Founded: 1784
- Ceased publication: 1816
- Language: English
- Headquarters: St. George's, Bermuda

The Bermuda Gazette was a Bermudian English-language weekly newspaper. Published from 1784 to 1803 by Joseph Stockdale (and by his three daughters from 1803 to 1816), it was Bermuda's first newspaper. In 1782, the Bermudian Legislature arranged for a printing press, and brought Stockdale from England to run it.

== Commemoration ==
Joseph Stockdale and the newspaper were honoured on Bermuda stamps in 1984 on the 200th anniversary of Bermuda's postal service and newspaper.

== See also ==
- List of newspapers in Bermuda
- Featherbed Alley Printshop
