= Mid-Ocean News =

- Type: Daily newspaper (became a weekly newspaper in 1968)
- Owner: The Bermuda Press (Holdings) Ltd.
- Founded: 1911
- Ceased publication: 16 October 2009
- Language: English
- Headquarters: Hamilton, Bermuda
- Sister newspapers: The Royal Gazette
- OCLC number: 9463984

The Mid-Ocean News was a Bermudian newspaper, published between 1911 and 16 October 2009. It was a sister publication of The Royal Gazette, which acquired it in 1962.

At the time, the Mid-Ocean News was a daily afternoon newspaper. In 1968, it became a weekly publication, distributed on Saturdays. From 1976 until the newspaper's final edition on 16 October 2009, it was a weekly newspaper published on Fridays.

In its final years, the newspaper had colour comics and a magazine-style television-programme section, and was published by The Bermuda Press (Holdings) Ltd., the owner of The Royal Gazette.

== See also ==
- Lists of newspapers
- List of newspapers in Bermuda
