= St. George's, Bermuda =

St. George's
- Town
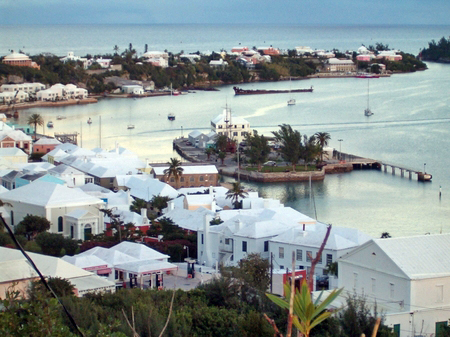
- St. George's harbour and town, seen from Fort George

- Flag

- Location within Bermuda
- Coordinates: 32°22′55″N 64°40′37″W
- Country: United Kingdom
- Overseas territory: Bermuda
- Settled: 1612

Population (2016)
  - Total: 1,527
- Time zone: UTC−04:00 (AST)
  - Summer (DST): UTC−03:00 (ADT)
- Climate: Af

UNESCO World Heritage Site
- Official name: Historic Town of St. George and Related Fortifications, Bermuda
- Type: Cultural
- Criteria: iv
- Designated: 2000 (24th session)
- Reference no.: 983
- Region: Western Europe (and North Atlantic)

St. George's (formally the Town of St. George or St. George's Town), located on the island and within the parish of the same names (and on the northern side of St. George's Harbour), settled in 1612, is the first permanent English (and later British) settlement on the islands of Bermuda. It is often described as the third permanent British settlement in the Americas, after Jamestown, Virginia (1607), and Cupids, Newfoundland (1610), and the oldest continuously-inhabited British town in the New World, since the other two settlements were seasonal for a number of years.

== Nomenclature ==
Where a toponym contains the name of a person, it is Bermudian/British convention to render the person's name in the possessive form. The place is rarely treated as equivalent to the person.

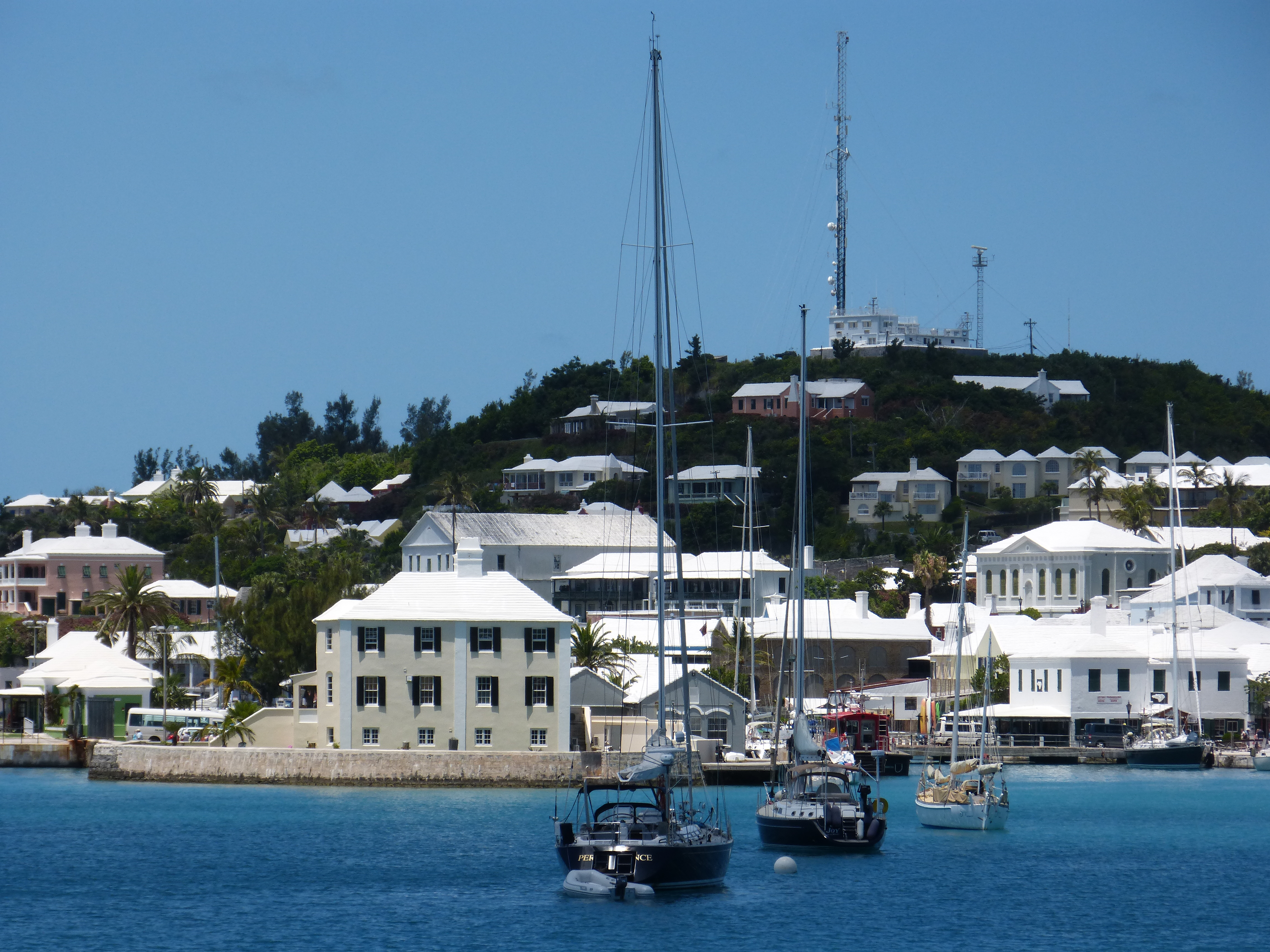
Ordnance Island (left) and St. George's Town are overlooked by Fort George

Among many examples of such place names in Bermuda are St. David's Island, Bailey's Bay, Smith's Parish (named for aristocrat Sir Thomas Smith), Sandys' Parish (named for Sir Edwin Sandys), Skeeters' Island (often mistakenly rendered "Skeeter's Island", it is named for Edward Skeeters and is also known as Burt's Island), Gibb's Hill, Barr's Bay, Ackermann's Hill, Nelly's Island, Cooper's Island, Darrell's Island, Paynter's Vale, Abbot's Head (or Abbot's Cliff), and Fort St. Catherine's (on St. Catherine's Point). The possessive form is also used for titles, as with Collector's Hill (named for the Collector of Taxes). Maps of Bermuda have most often been produced by non-Bermudians and names given on them do not always conform to Bermudian practice.

The use of the possessive form is not exclusive, however, as exemplified by place names such as the names of most of the parishes (which – other than St. George's Parish – all commemorate historical people), such as Hamilton Parish (named for James Hamilton, 2nd Marquess of Hamilton), Devonshire Parish (named for William Cavendish, 1st Earl of Devonshire), and Paget Parish. Some of these exceptions may have originated with changed syntax, as Devonshire Parish may originally have been The Parish of Devonshire. This is seen with the City of Hamilton (named for Henry Hamilton, a former Governor of Bermuda). Whereas the City of Hamilton is commonly referred to as Hamilton, The Town of St. George, St. George's Parish, St. George's Island, and St. George's Harbour (and any other toponym usually containing a person's name in the possessive form) always remains possessive when shortened, such as in the St. George's Foundation.

== History ==
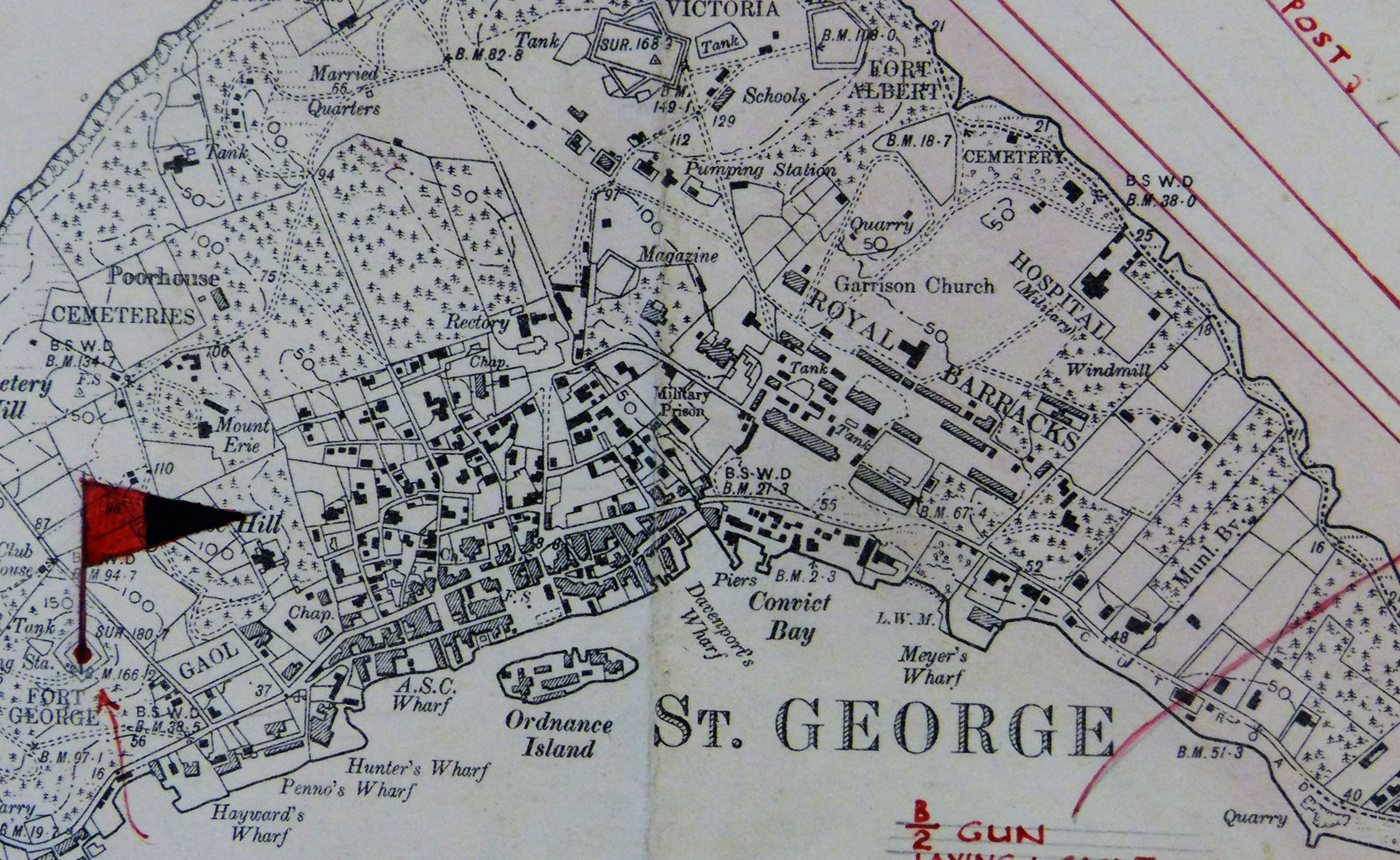
Map of St. George's Town (and St. George's Garrison), c. 1897–1899

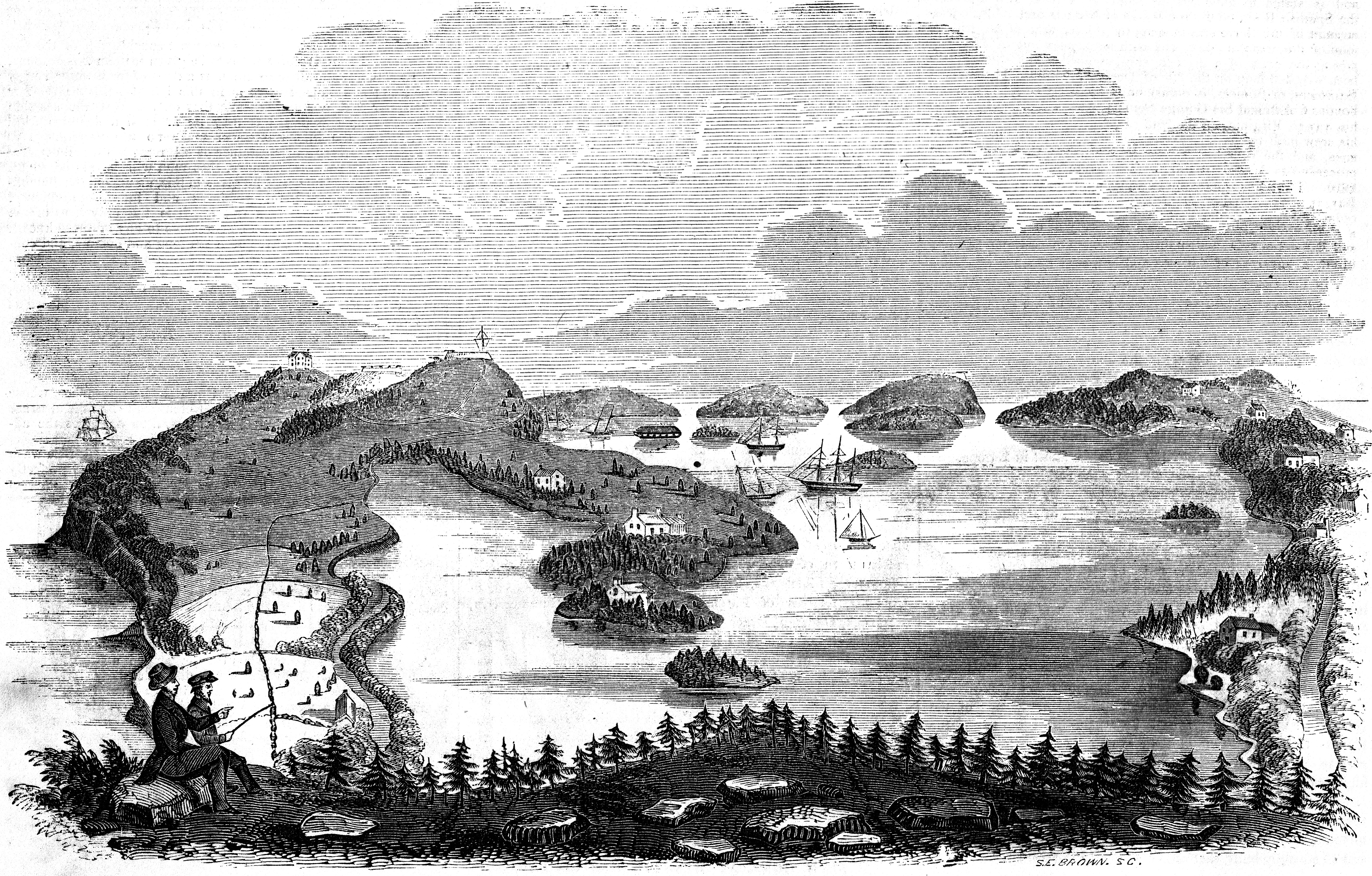
The harbour at St. George's in 1854

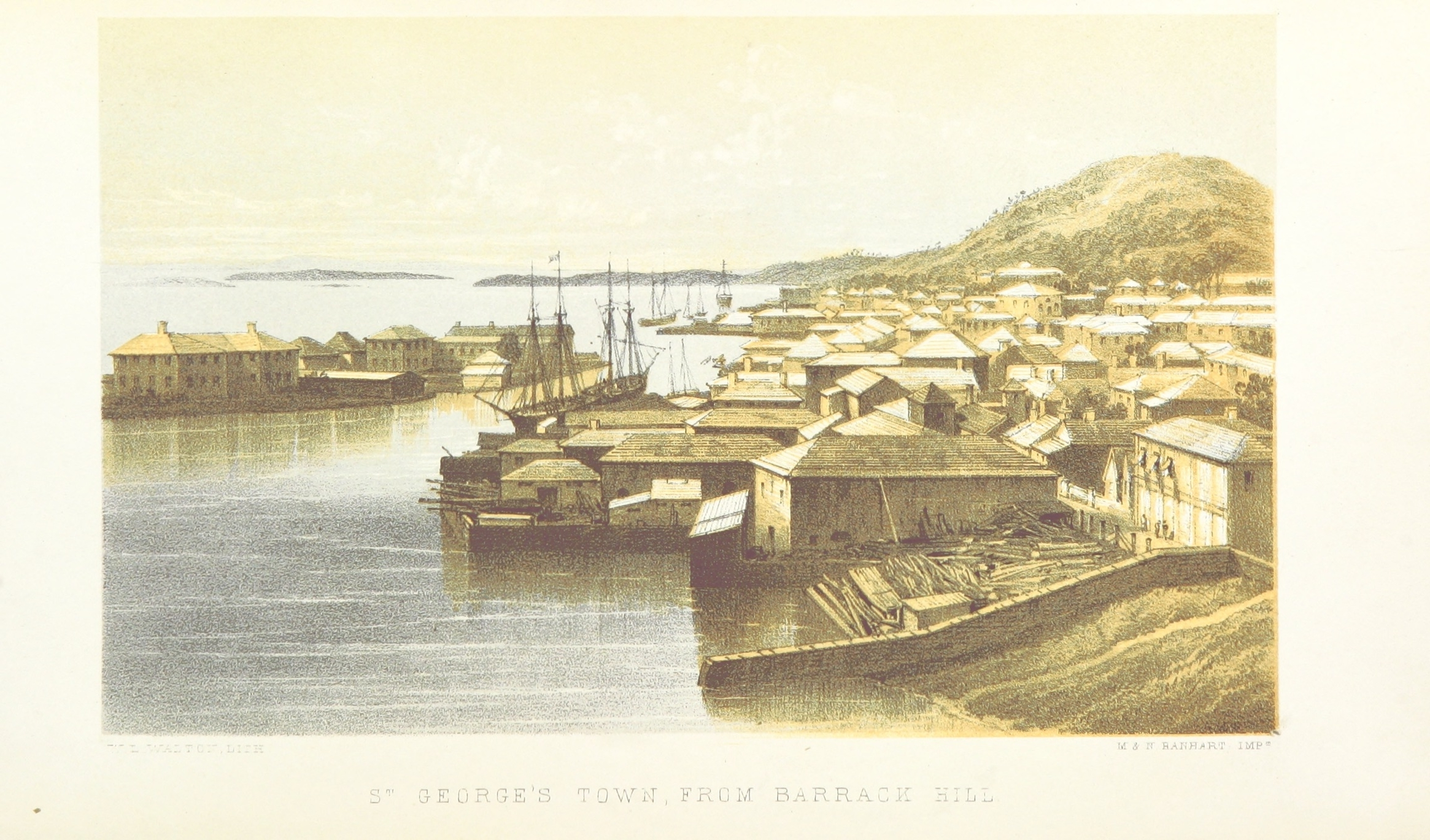
St. George's Town, from Barrack Hill, 1857

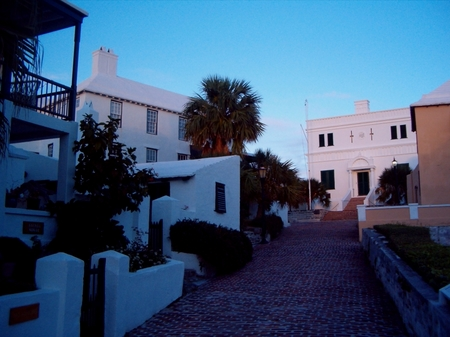
The State House, the home of Bermuda's parliament in St. George's from 1620 until the capital's relocation to Hamilton in 1815.

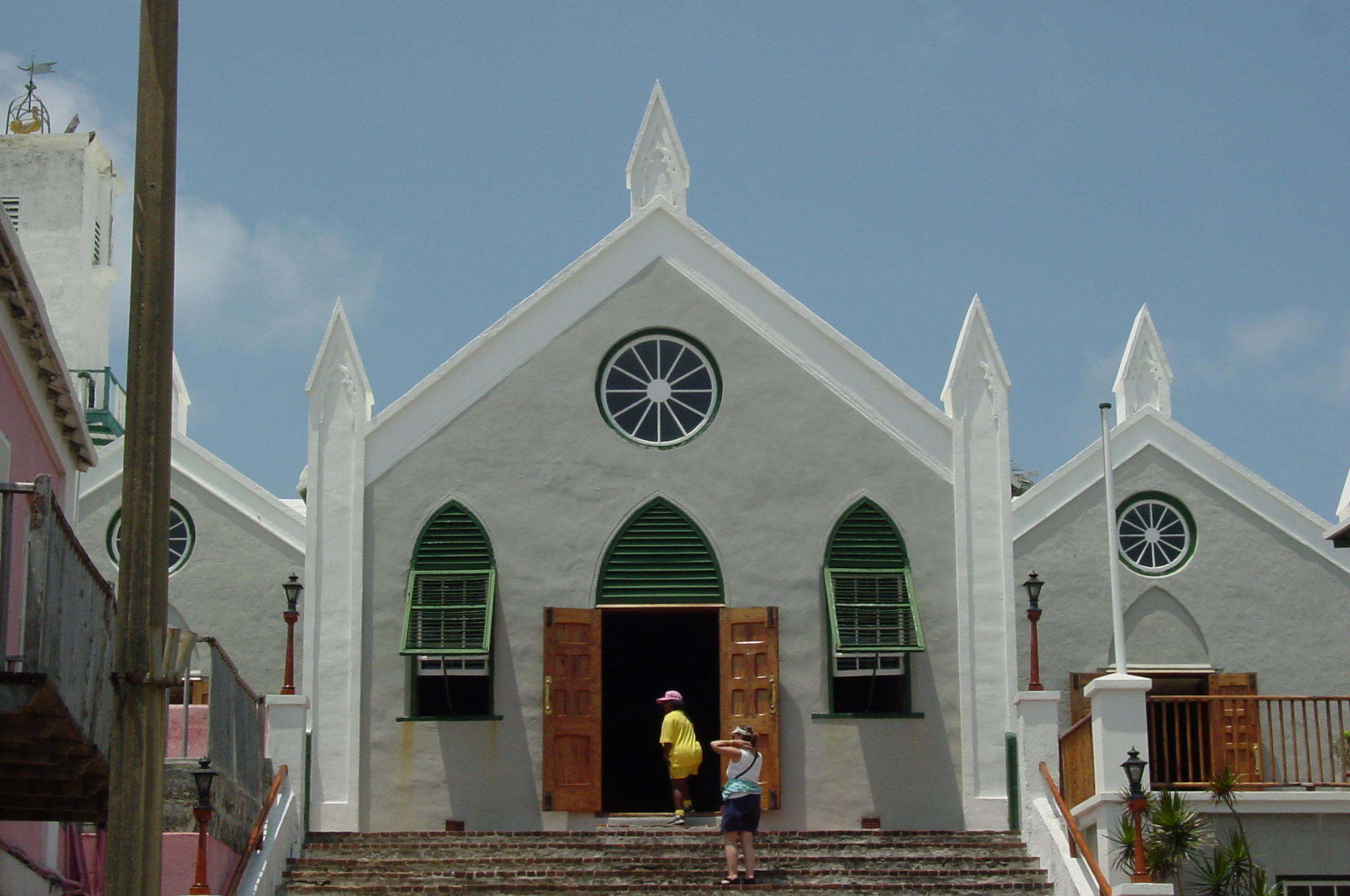
Saint Peter's Church.

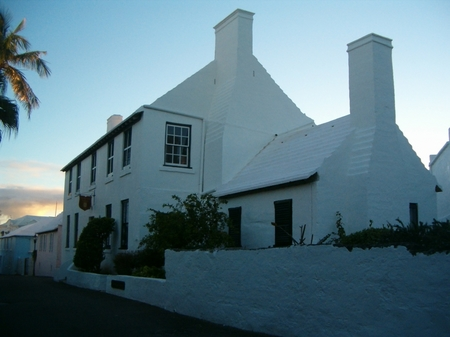
Stewart Hall, c. 1707.

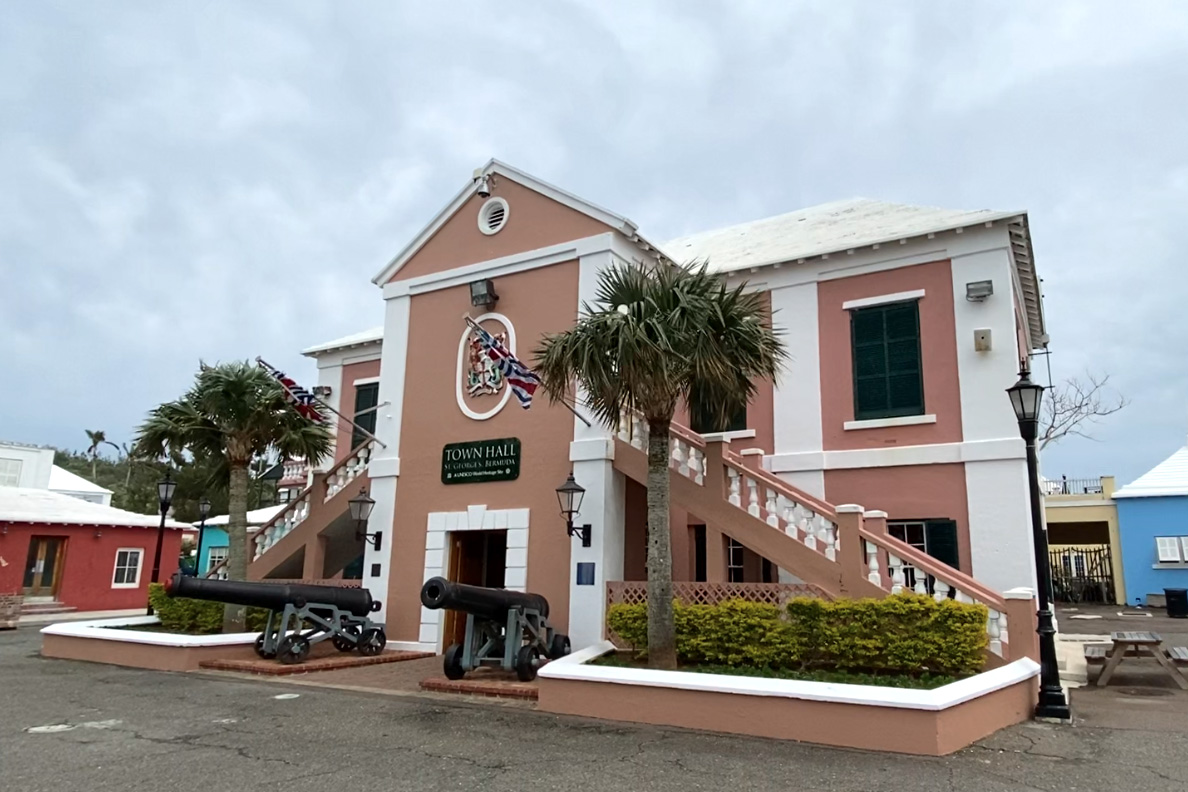
St. George's Town Hall

Originally called New London, St. George's was first settled in 1612. This was three years after the first English settlers landed on St. George's Island on their way to Virginia. Led by Admiral Sir George Somers and Lieutenant-General Sir Thomas Gates, they had deliberately steered their ship, Sea Venture, onto a reef to escape a storm. The survivors built two new ships, the Deliverance and Patience, and most continued their voyage to Jamestown, but the Virginia Company laid claim to the island.

Two men remained behind to maintain the company's possession of the archipelago (a third stayed when the Patience returned later that year). By the Virginia Company's Third Charter in 1612, the boundaries of the new colony were extended out to sea to include Bermuda. The company sent a party of 60 new settlers to Bermuda to join the three men left behind by the Sea Venture. After a brief period on neighbouring St. David's, the settlers started building structures at St. George's, located in a sheltered sound that kept ships protected from bad weather.

In 1615, the shareholders of the Virginia Company created a second company, the Somers Isles Company. It administered Bermuda separately until the company was dissolved in 1686. (The Virginia Company was dissolved in 1624).

This small town was the capital of Bermuda until 1815; it was linked to the history of colonial America. Ten thousand Bermudians emigrated, primarily to Virginia and the American Southeast, before United States independence made them citizens of separate nations. Branches of wealthy Bermudian merchant families dominated trade in the area's ports. Bermudians settled towns in the South, and contributed greatly to the make up of the populations of several US states.

As Bermuda's population centre, and only true port during this period, St. George's was connected to development in the North American colonies. During the American War of Independence, at the request of George Washington, Bermudians assisted the American rebels in stealing much-needed gunpowder from a St. George's magazine, which supplied the forts protecting the port. The powder was carried over the hill to Tobacco Bay, from where boats transported it to an American ship that lay offshore.

During the American Civil War, some British from St. George's evaded coastal blockades to provide supplies and munitions to the desperate Confederates. This trade was based in St. George's.

King's Square forms the centre of St George's, where regular 17th-century re-enactments are held throughout the year. Excavations carried out by Bristol University and the Bermuda National Trust discovered the foundations here of the original 1612 governor's house. The Bermuda National Trust Museum is located on the square.

Ordnance Island in St. George's Harbour, is situated south of King's Square. It holds a replica of Deliverance (one of the two ships built by the survivors of Sea Venture), and a life-sized statue of Admiral of the Virginia Company, Sir George Somers, by Desmond Fountain. Somers, along with Sir Thomas Gates, had led the survivors of the 1609 wreck.

The town has numerous historical sites, such as the old State House from 1620. Other than fortifications, this was the first stone building in Bermuda, built to house the Parliament. It is the oldest building on the island. Others of note are the Unfinished Church, the Old Rectory, St. Peter's (the oldest surviving Anglican and oldest continuously occupied Protestant church in the Western hemisphere), the Tucker House, the Bermuda National Trust Museum, and the St. George's Historical Society Museum and the Featherbed Alley Printshop museum (both in the Mitchell House).

In 1996, the town was twinned with Lyme Regis, in Dorset, England, the birthplace of Admiral Sir George Somers. In 2000, the town, together with numerous surrounding fortifications, including the Castle Islands Fortifications, was designated as a UNESCO World Heritage Site, formally known as the Historic Town of St George and Related Fortifications.

== Sports ==
St. George's Colts and Hamilton Parish football clubs play their games at the Wellington Oval, which also serves as a cricket ground.

== Education ==
St. George's Preschool serves the area.

St. George's Primary School is in the community.

== Notable people ==
- Charles Delucena Meigs (1792–1869), American obstetrician
- Robert John Simmons, who served in the Bermuda Garrison before dying of wounds as a First Sergeant in the 54th Massachusetts Infantry Regiment during the United States Civil War.
- Thomas Tudor Tucker (1745 in St. George's – 1828 in Washington, D.C.) was a Bermuda-born American physician and politician representing Charleston, South Carolina.
- John Hamilton Gray QC (1814 in St. George's – 1889 in Victoria, British Columbia) was a politician in the Province of New Brunswick, Canada, a jurist, and one of the Fathers of Confederation
- Reverend Robert Ashington Bullen FLS, FGS, FZS, FRAS (1850 St. George's – 1912 in UK) was an Anglican priest, a geologist and an authority on Mollusca

== See also ==
- Historic Town of St George and Related Fortifications, Bermuda
- History of Bermuda

== Gallery ==
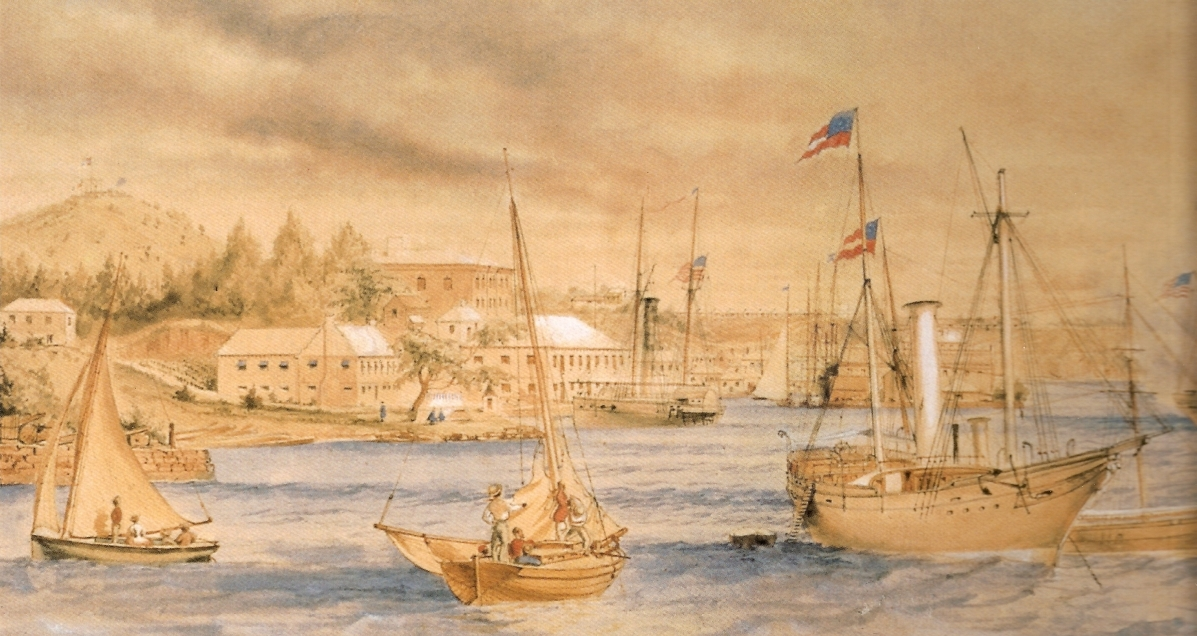
St. George's Harbour, ca. 1864. Confederate blockade runners are visible.

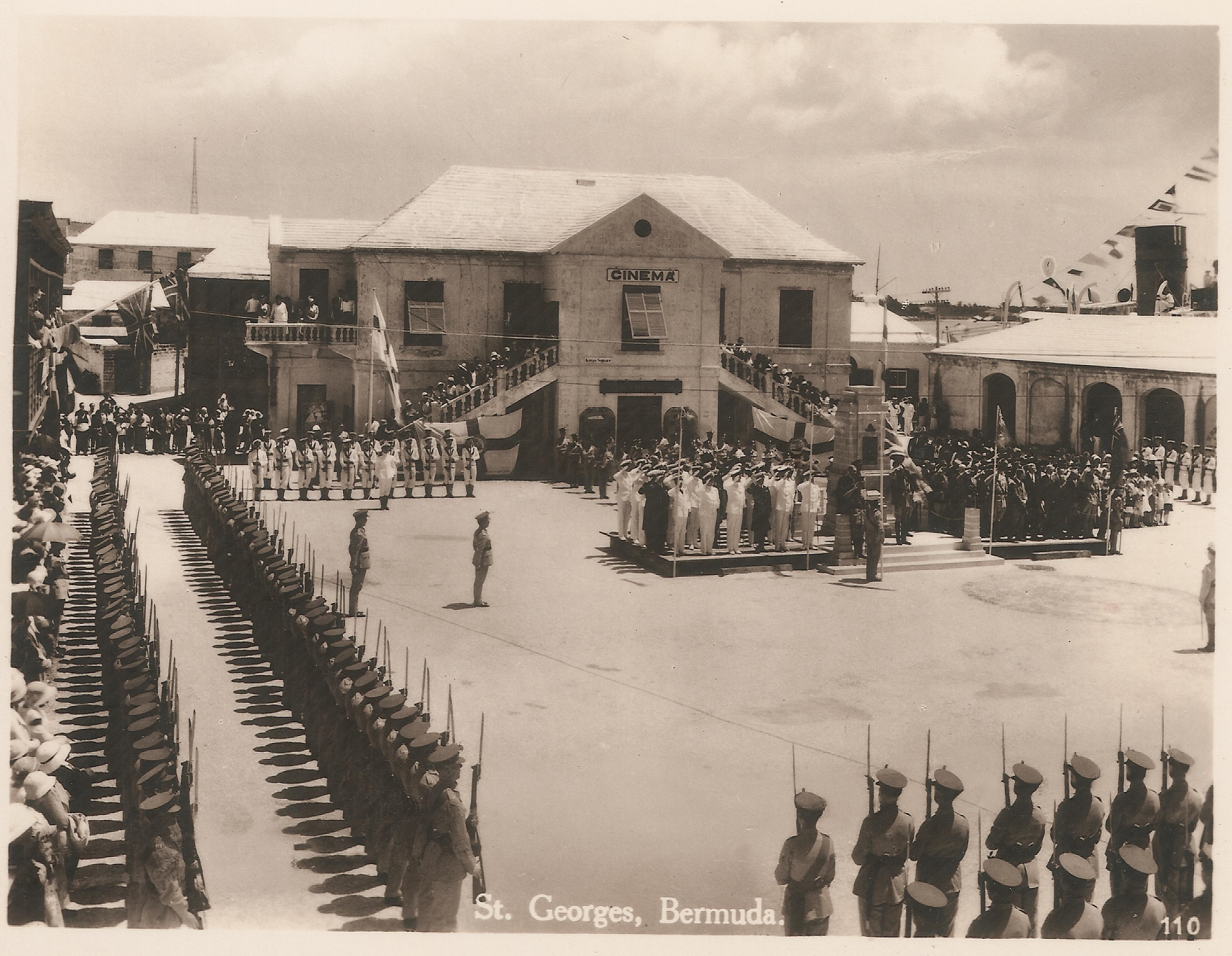
Naval and military parade in King's Square in the 1930s

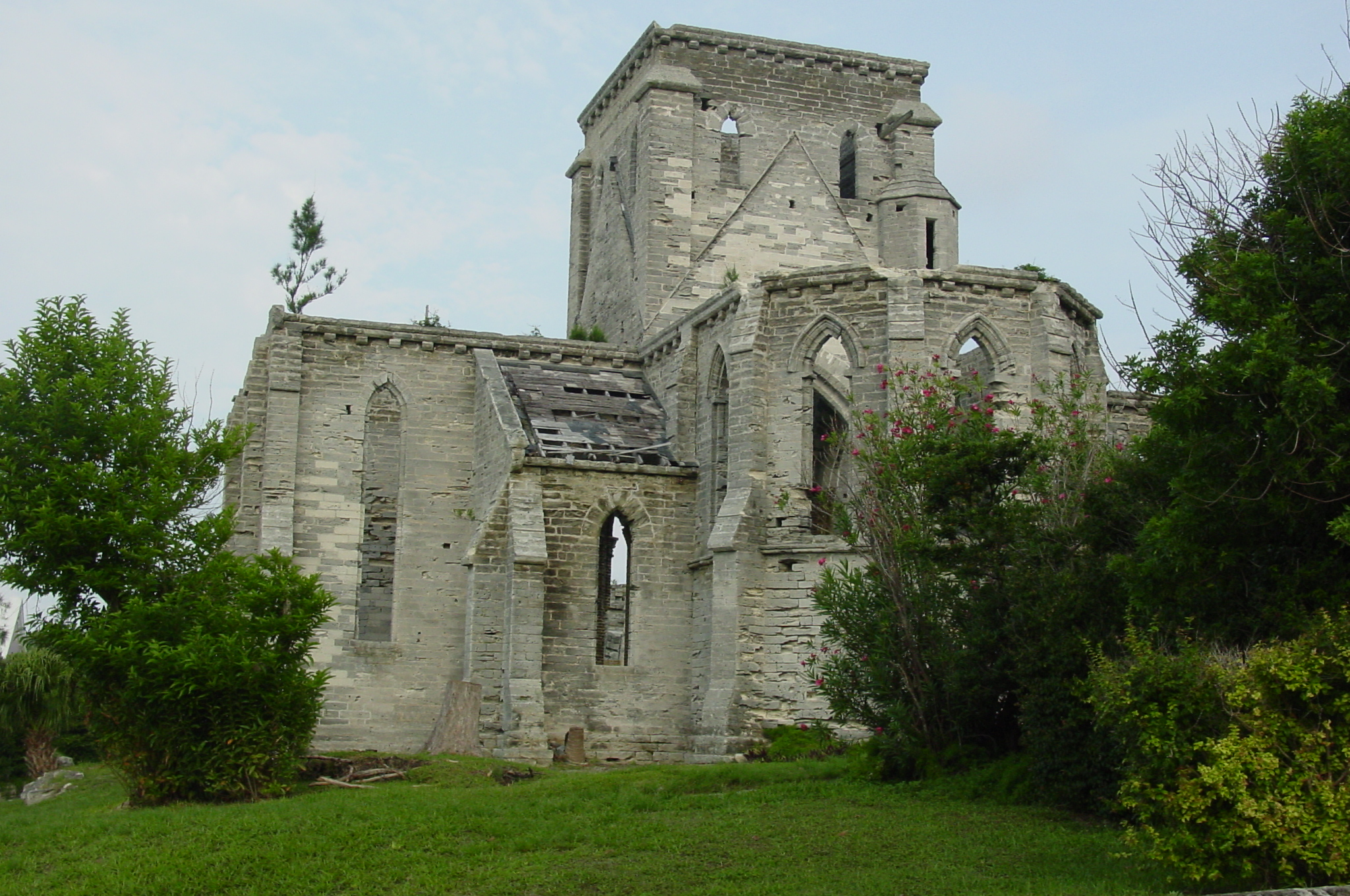
The Unfinished Church

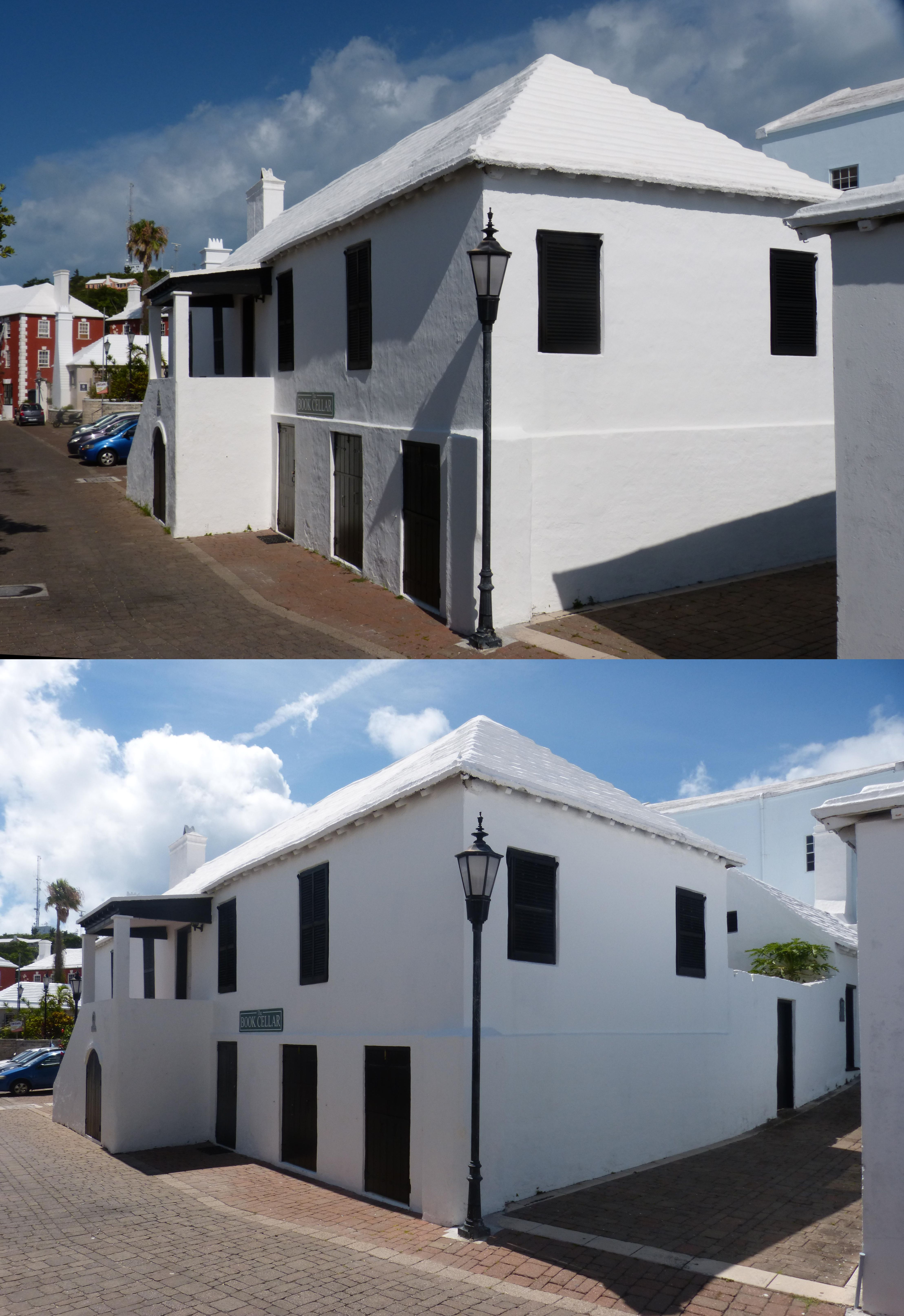
Tucker House (housing a museum of the Bermuda National Trust), on Water Street and Barber's Alley

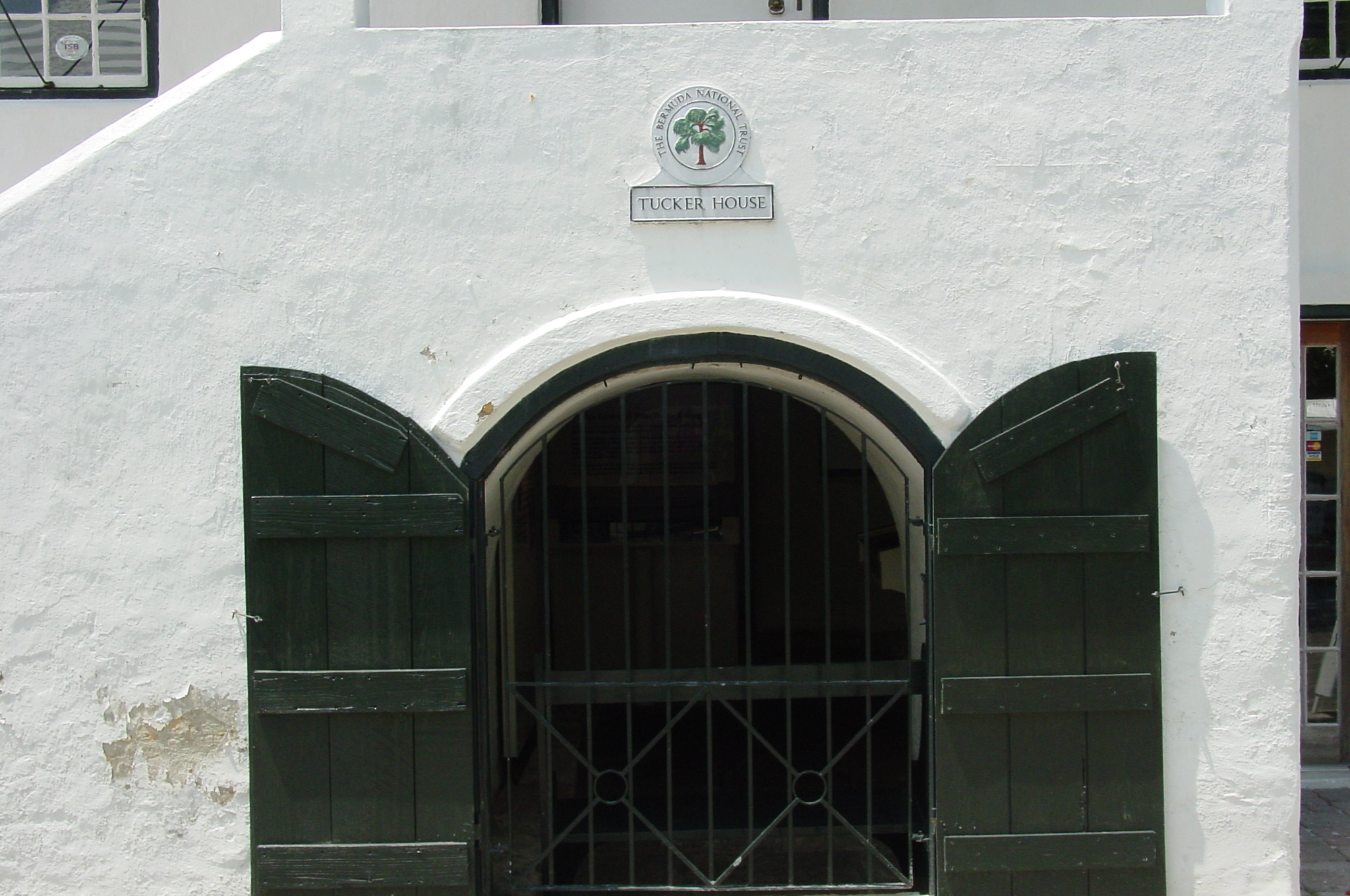
Entrance to The Tucker House

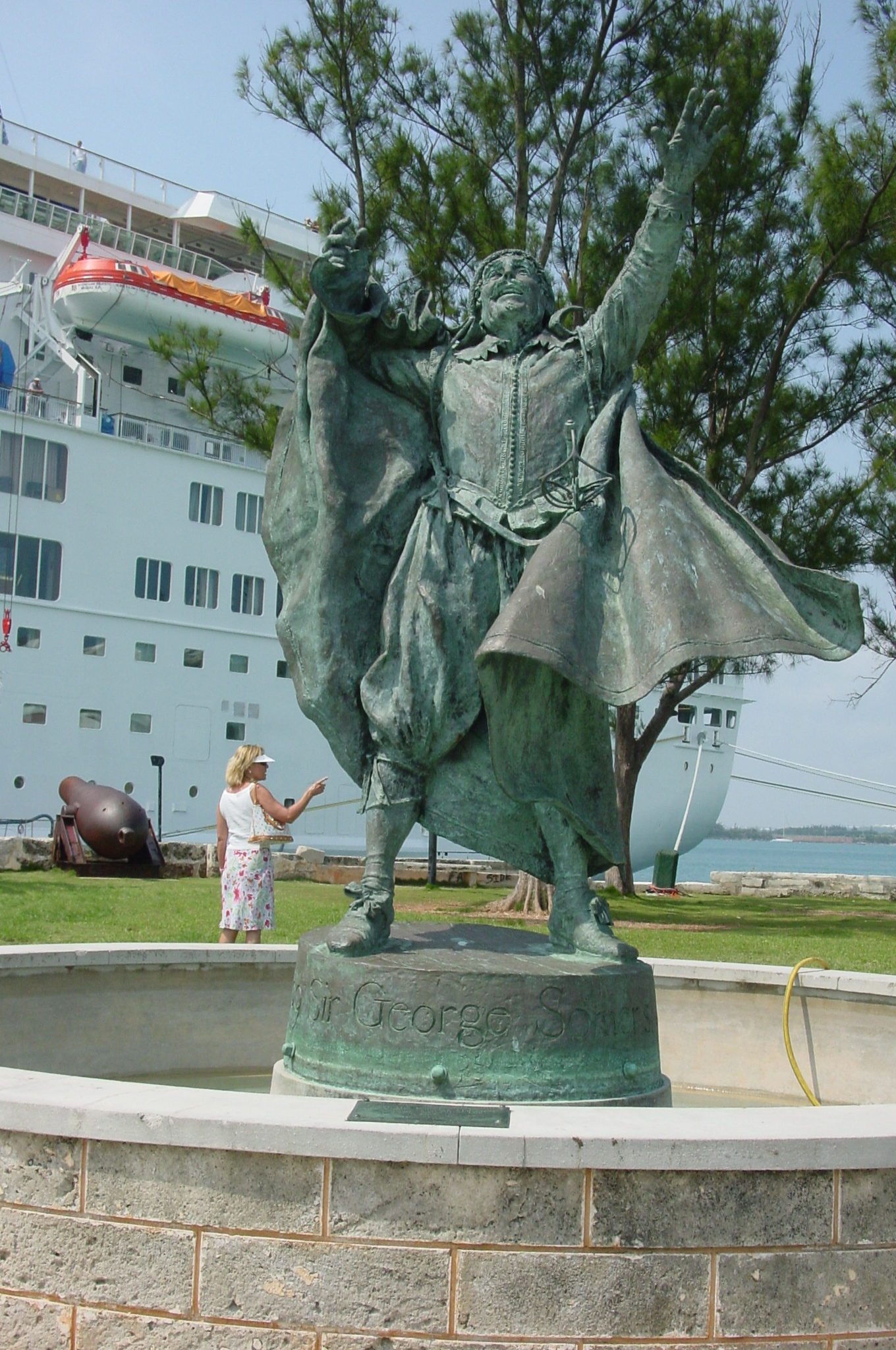
Statue of George Somers

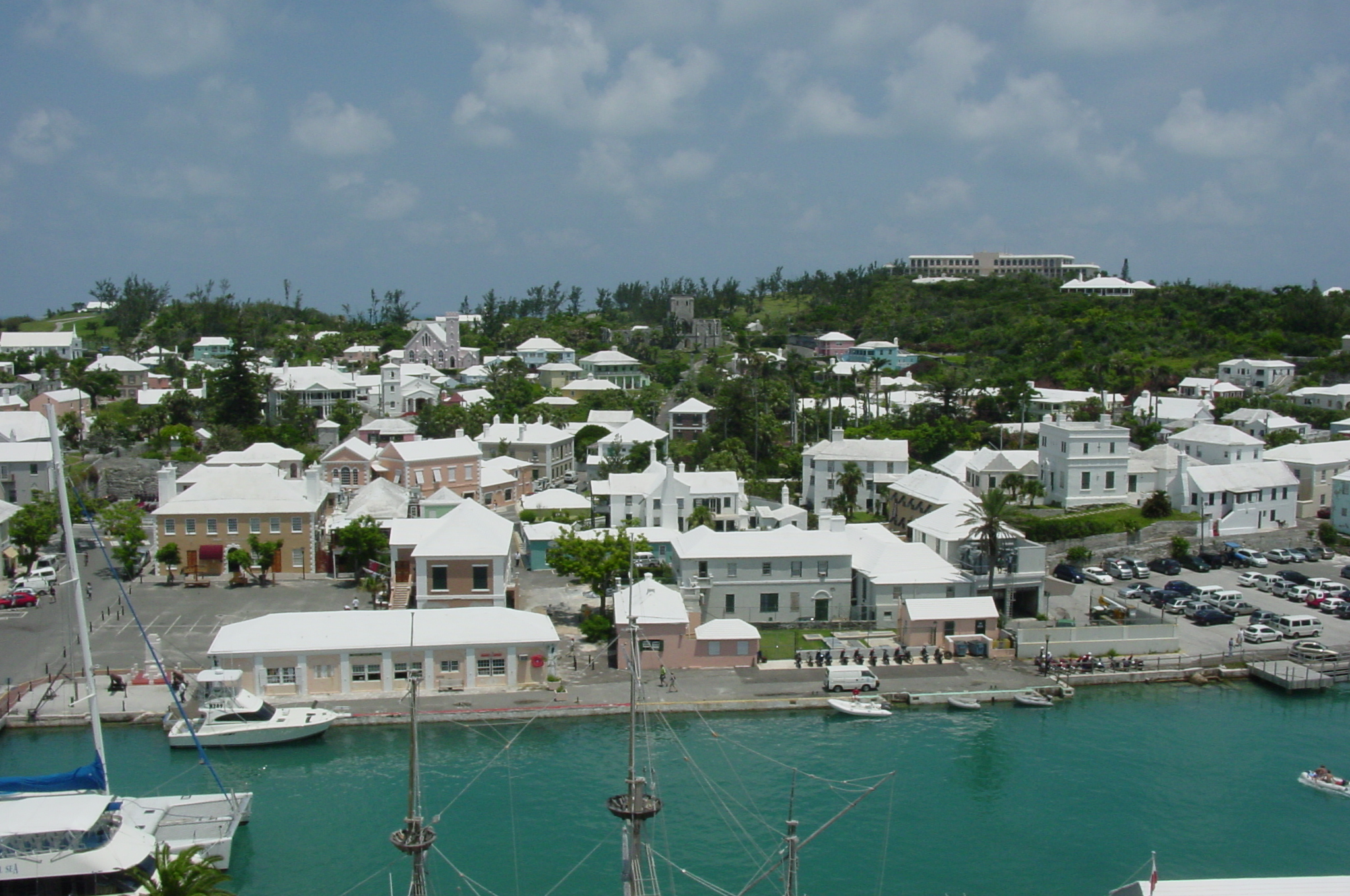
View from the harbour

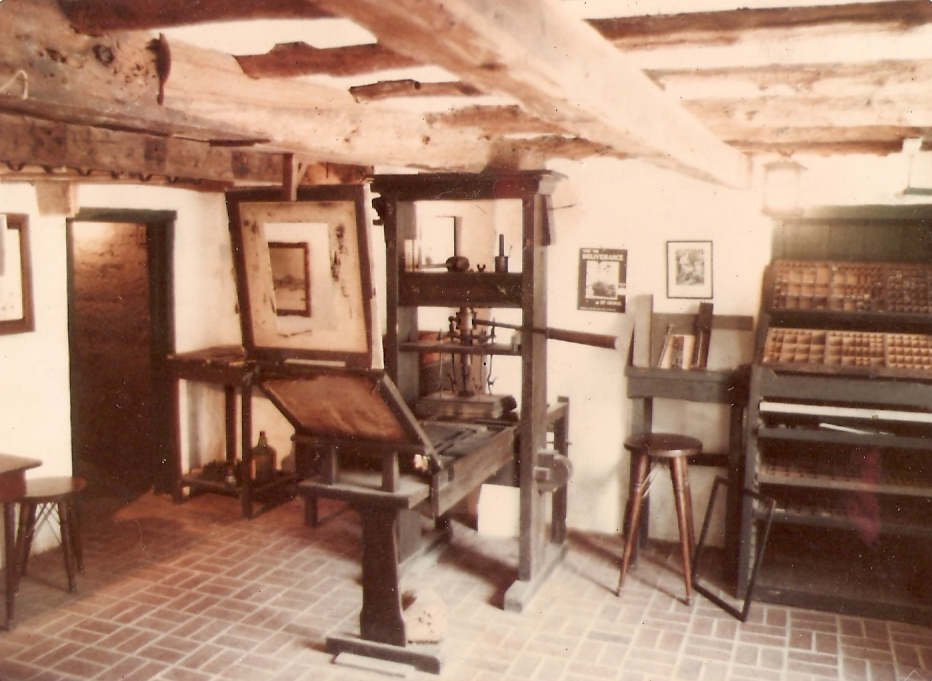
The Featherbed Alley Printshop Museum

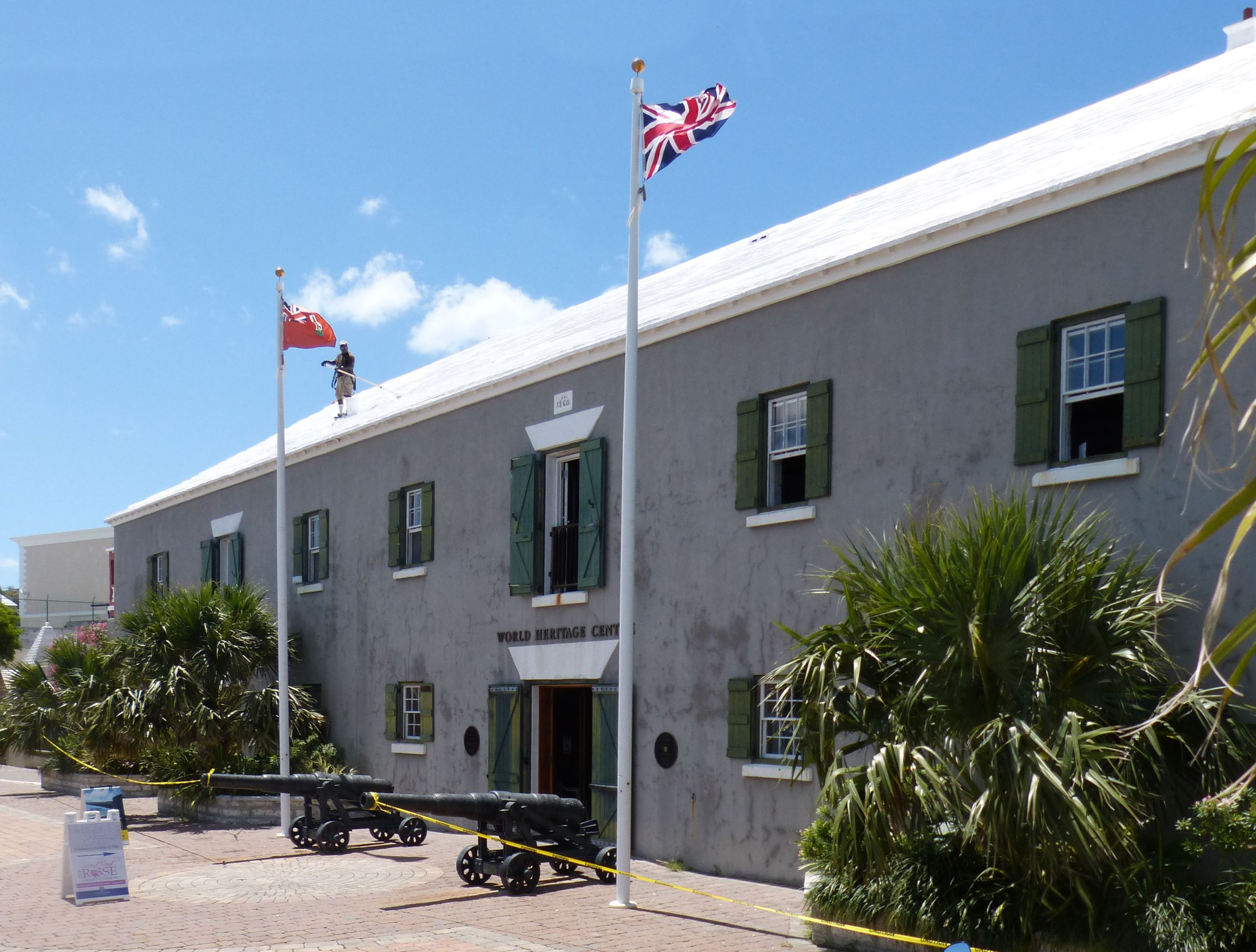
The St. George's Foundation's UNESCO World Heritage Centre on Penno's Wharf
