= Castle Islands Fortifications, Bermuda =

Coordinates: 32°20′27″N 64°40′19″W

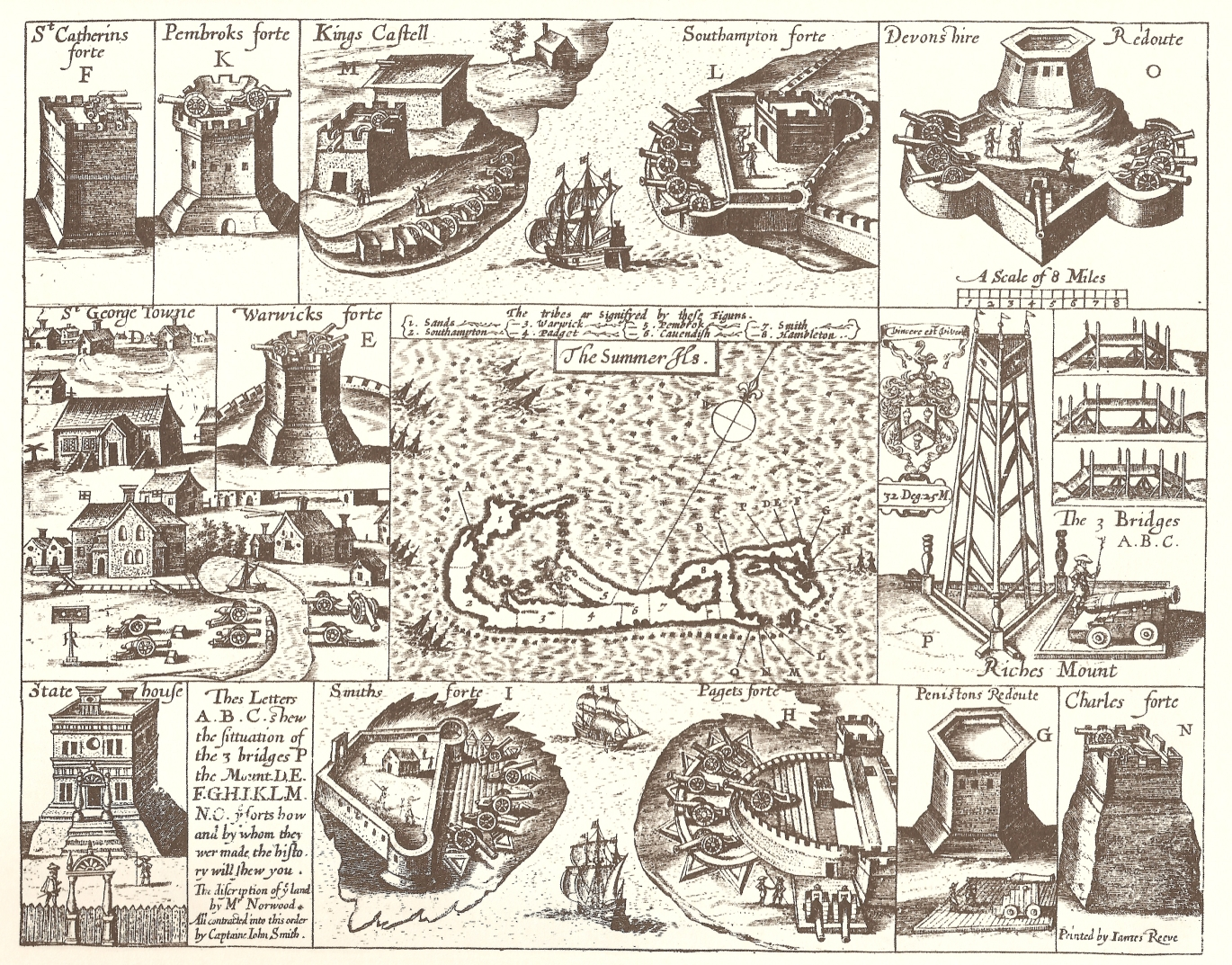
- Captain John Smith's 1624 map of Bermuda, showing contemporary fortifications
- Interactive map of Castle Islands Fortifications, Bermuda
- Location: Castle Harbour, Bermuda

History
- Built: 17th Century

UNESCO World Heritage Site
- Type: Cultural
- Criteria: iv
- Designated: 2000 (24th session)
- Part of: Historic Town of St George and Related Fortifications, Bermuda
- Reference no.: 983
- Region: Europe and North America

Several of the islands strung across the South entrance of Castle Harbour, Bermuda were fortified in the early days of the territory, hence the harbour's name. When official settlement of the archipelago by England began in 1612 (unofficial settlement having begun with the 1609 wrecking of the Sea Venture) the first permanent town, St. George's (then called New London) was placed on the North side of St. George's Harbour. St. George's Harbour could be accessed directly by channels from the East. Those channels, however, were shallow, suitable, originally, only for small ships. As a consequence, and despite any major settlement on its shores, Castle Harbour was an important anchorage in the early years of the colony, with its main entrance, Castle Roads being an important route in from the open Atlantic for shipping. It was also a weak point, as it was remote from the defences of St. George's Harbour, and difficult to reach. It was quickly fortified and garrisoned by a standing militia.

Initial fortification by the Virginia Company's (Bermuda was originally settled as an extension of Virginia) first deliberate settlers in 1612, was around the inlets to St. George's Harbour, but by the end of that year work had commenced on Castle Harbour's defences, starting at Castle Island (previously called Gurnett's Head, and King's Island). As a temporary measure, two guns had been salvaged from the 1609 wreck of the Sea Venture, one of which was installed on Castle Island ) in 1612. Proper fortifications were soon raised under the instructions of Governor Richard Moore. King's Castle (called Queen's Castle during the reigns of Queen Anne and Queen Victoria, though, like King's Square in St. George's Town, current practice ignores the sex of the current Monarch) is, today, the oldest surviving English fortification in the New World. It is Bermuda's oldest standing stone building, predating the State House. Its Captain's House, built a year after the State House, in 1621, is the oldest stone home in Bermuda. It is also the oldest standing English house in the New World. In 1614, King's Castle famously repulsed Spain's only ever attack on Bermuda. Two shots were fired from its artillery. Although neither struck, the Spanish vessel abandoned the attack (its crew did not realise that the gunners in the fort had only enough ammunition for one more shot). This fort was used as late as the Second World War by Bermuda's military garrison, with soldiers living in tents within its walls, watching over the channels with machine guns. Other forts built at the South of Castle Harbour included Devonshire Redoubt (1620) and the Landward Fort, on Castle Island, Southampton Fort (1620), on Brangman's Island (originally known as Moore's Island and Southampton Island), at the East side of Castle Roads, Old Castle, or Charles' Fort, (1615), on Goat Island, Pembroke Fort, on Cooper's Island, and Fort Bruere, on the Main Island.

Forts and batteries on the islands of St. George's Harbour (1-13) and Castle Harbour (14-25), Bermuda

At Ferry Reach, on the north of Castle Harbour (an area now separated by the Causeway), Burnt Point Fort, or Ferry Point Battery (in 1688), and Ferry Island Fort (in the 1790s) were built, and in 1822 a Martello Tower. Ferry Island Fort and the Martello tower were both built by the regular British Army, which had established a permanent Bermuda Garrison following US Independence (although detachments had been posted in Bermuda almost continuously since 1701). The island chain across the South of Castle Harbour (which includes Castle Island) is often referred to as the Castle Islands. Their fortifications are the oldest surviving English New World fortifications (due primarily to their being constructed of stone, whereas contemporary English fortifications on the North American continent were built from timber and earth). They were also the first English coastal fortifications in the New World. Those then existing were depicted and described in the 1624 book, The Generall Historie of Virginia, New-England, and the Summer Isles, by Captain John Smith. As a result of their historical significance, they have been made a UNESCO World Heritage Site, together with St. George's Town and other nearby fortifications, like Fort St. Catherine (UNESCO World Heritage Site: Historic Town of St George and Related Fortifications, Bermuda).

== Gallery ==
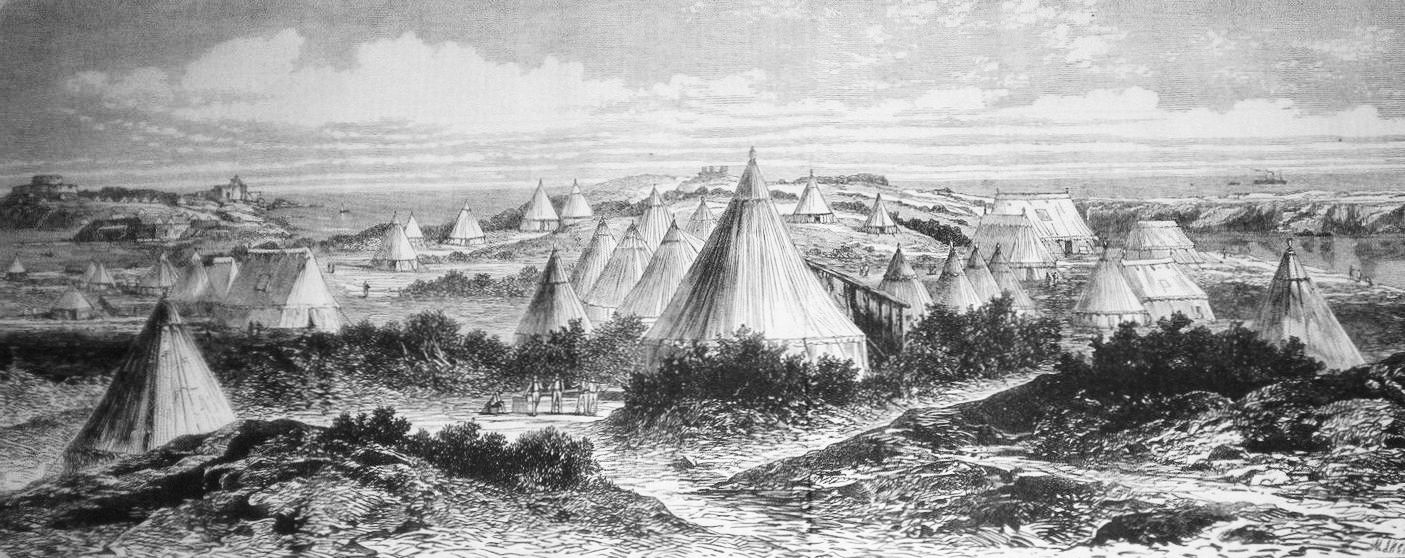
Royal Artillery and Royal Engineers camp at Tucker's Town, in 1867, with Castle Island forts in the background

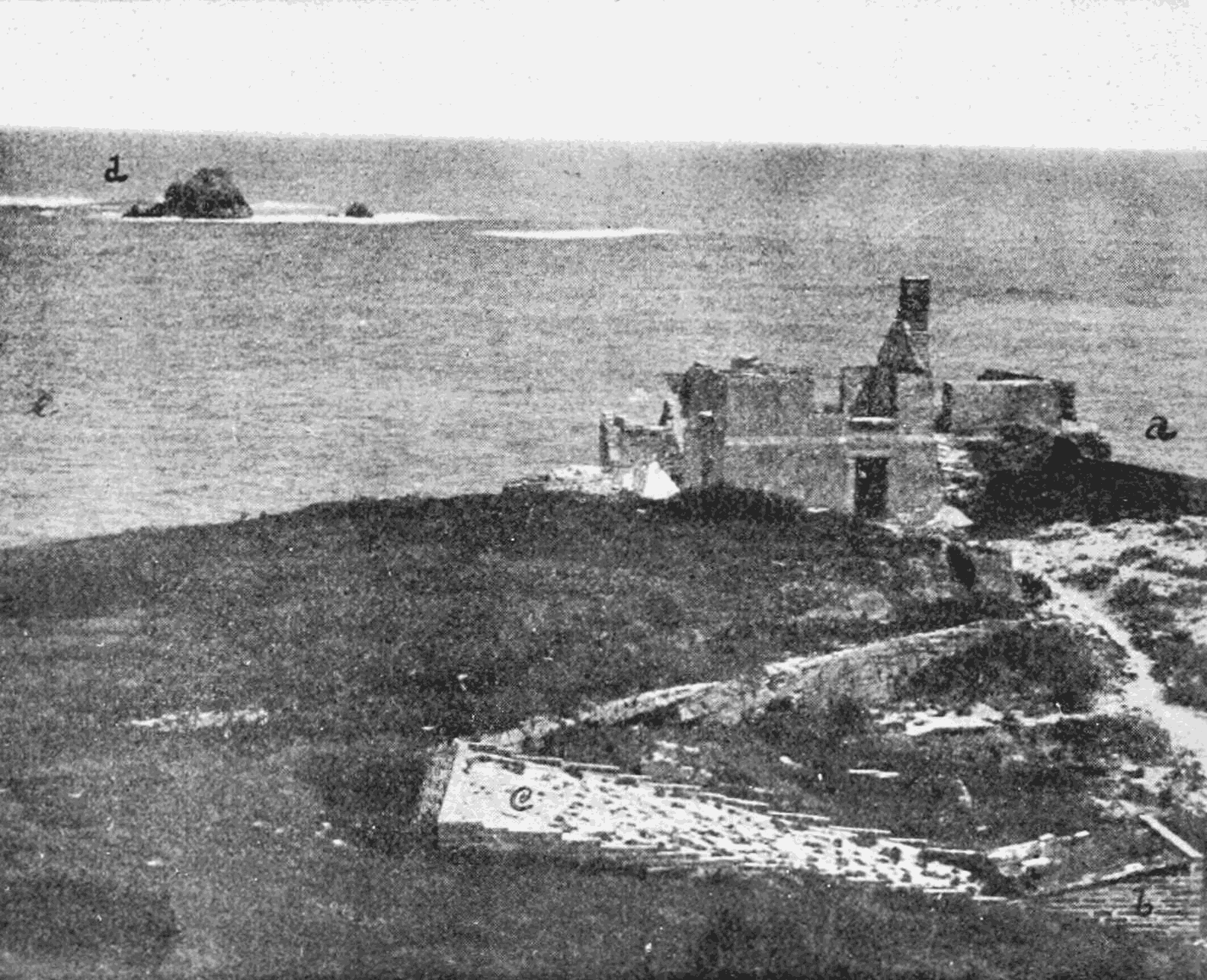
Ruined King's Castle ("Queen's Castle" during the reigns of Queens Anne and Victoria, and also called "Seaward Fort") on Castle Island

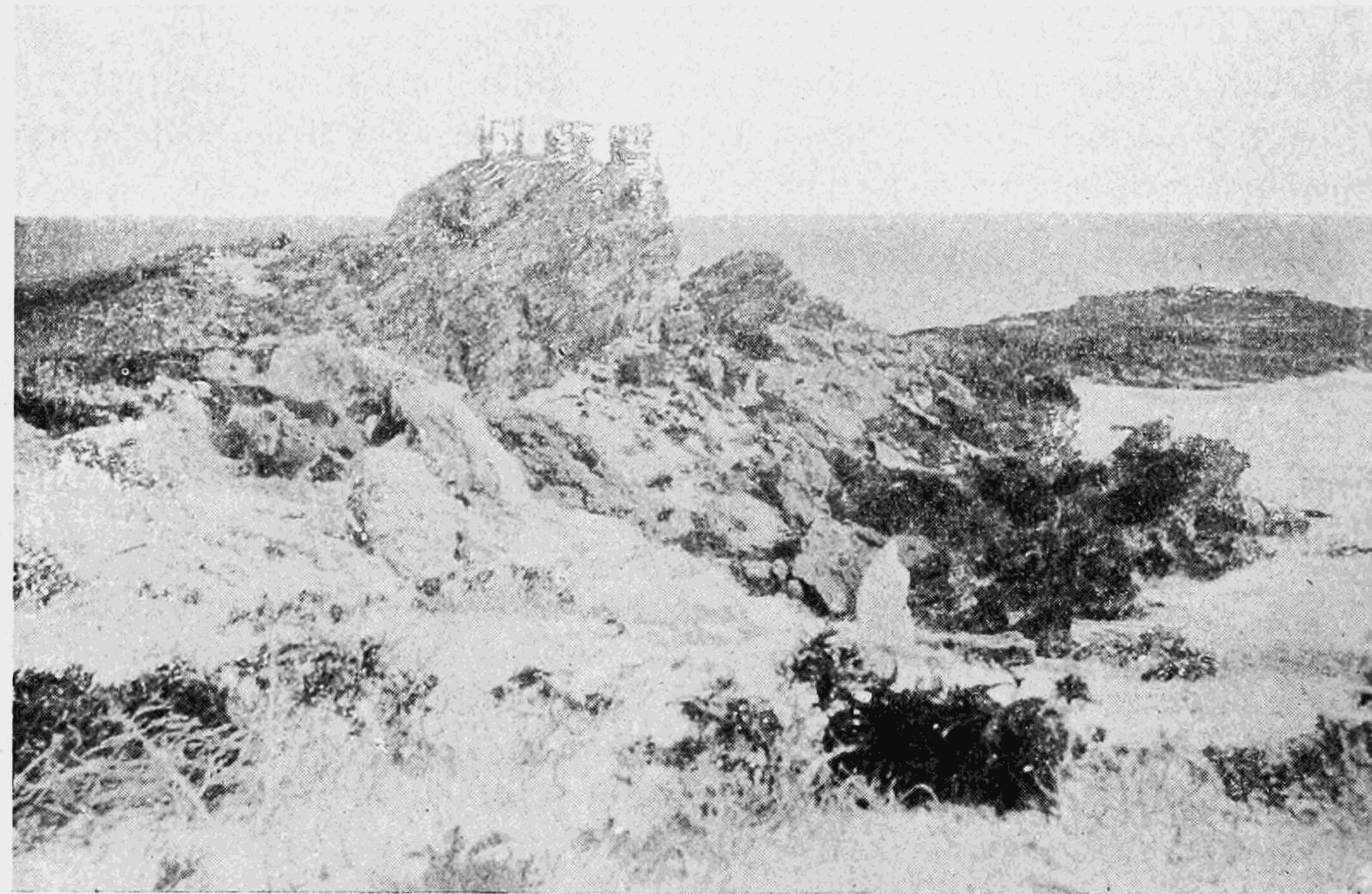
Goat Island with Charles' Fort ruins

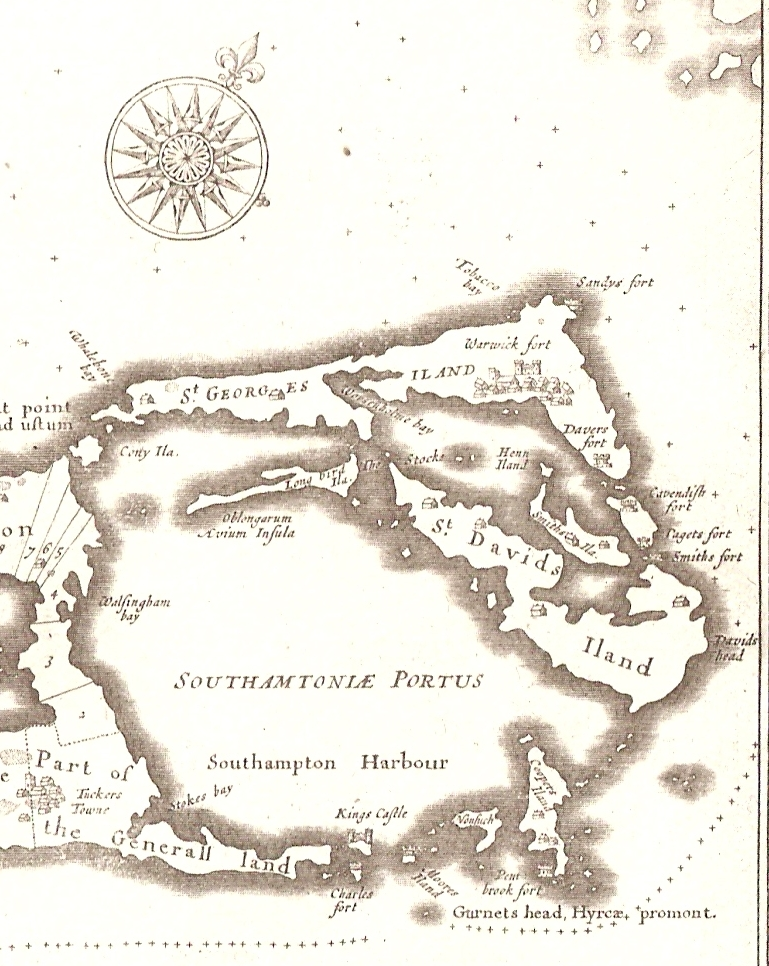
The Parish of St. George's, in 1676. Castle Island lies to the South of Castle Harbour (originally Southampton Harbour).

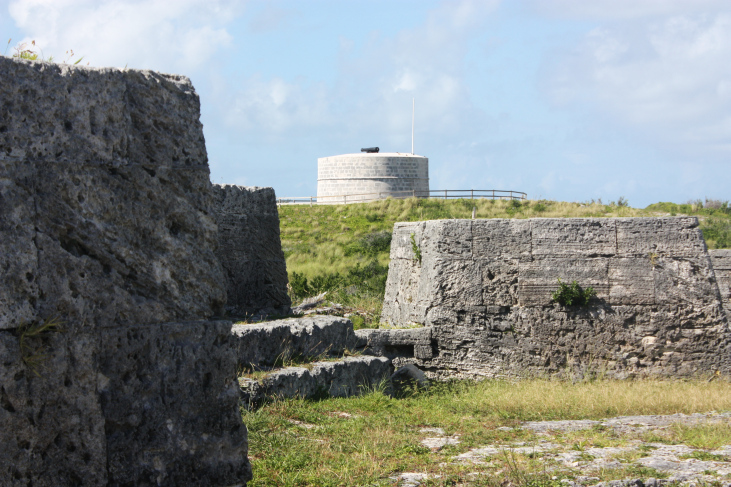
Martello Tower seen from Ferry Island Fort, Ferry Reach, Bermuda 2011
