= 1952 Bermuda air crash =

Aviation incident

Coordinates: 32°24′04″N 64°36′43″W

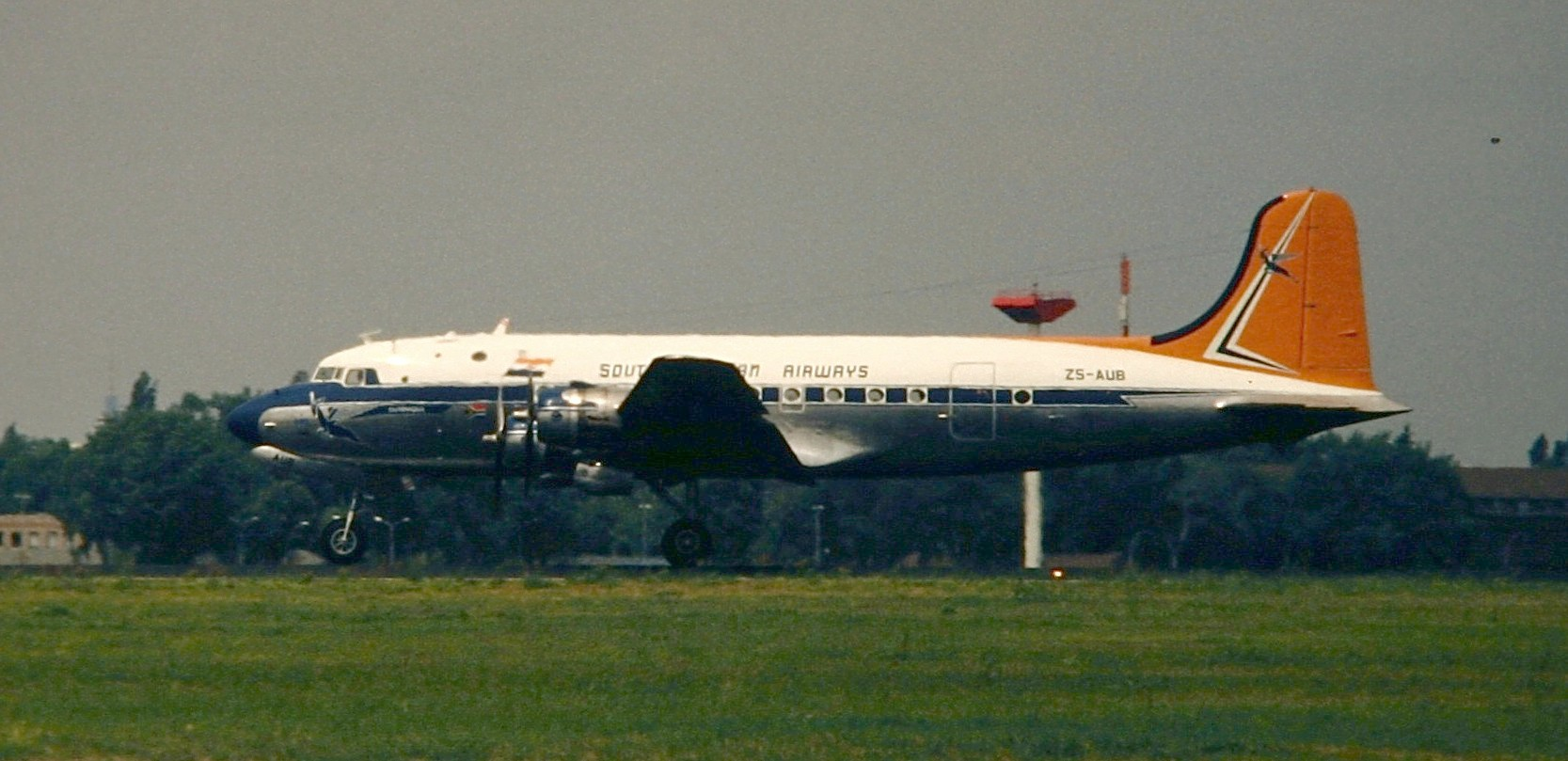
- A Douglas DC-4 similar to the accident aircraft

Accident
- Date: 6 December 1952
- Summary: Lost control and crashed after takeoff; cause undetermined
- Site: Bermuda

Aircraft
- Aircraft type: Douglas DC-4
- Operator: Cubana de Aviación
- Registration: CU-T397
- Flight origin: Kindley Air Force Base now L.F. Wade International Airport, Bermuda
- Destination: José Martí International Airport, Cuba
- Occupants: 42
- Passengers: 34
- Crew: 8
- Fatalities: 38
- Injuries: 4
- Survivors: 4

The 1952 Bermuda air crash occurred on 6 December 1952, when a Douglas DC-4, registered CU-T397 and operated by Cubana de Aviación, flying from Madrid to Havana, crashed into the Atlantic Ocean following a refuelling stop at Kindley Air Force Base in Bermuda. The crash killed 37 of the 42 occupants of the aircraft. The cause of the crash was never determined, and it is the worst aviation accident in the history of Bermuda.

== Accident ==
The aircraft, a Douglas DC-4 named "Star of the East", was en route from Madrid to Bermuda with scheduled stops at Santa Maria Airport in Vila do Porto in the Portuguese autonomous region of the Azores, and Kindley Field, near Castle Harbour, Bermuda. It was operated by Cubana de Aviación, a subsidiary of Pan American World Airways. It arrived at Kindley field at 3:30 am, and after refuelling, it departed at 4:45 am with 34 passengers and a crew of eight. About a minute after taking off, an explosion occurred, and the plane crashed into the sea. It remained afloat for some time after it crashed, which allowed the rescue of seven survivors. Three of the survivors died shortly after being rescued. The accident killed 38 passengers and crew; three passengers and a crew-member survived the crash.

Bermuda's Director of Civil Aviation, E. M. Ware, said at the time that the take-off apparently had been normal. It is believed no message came from the plane before it plunged into the sea, probably while still pushing the engines hard to gain altitude. Four survivors were taken to the Kindley base hospital.

The cause of the accident was never determined. It remains the worst aviation accident in Bermudian history.
