= Castle Roads =

Channel in Bermuda

Coordinates: 32.3403°N 64.6693°W

Location of Castle Roads

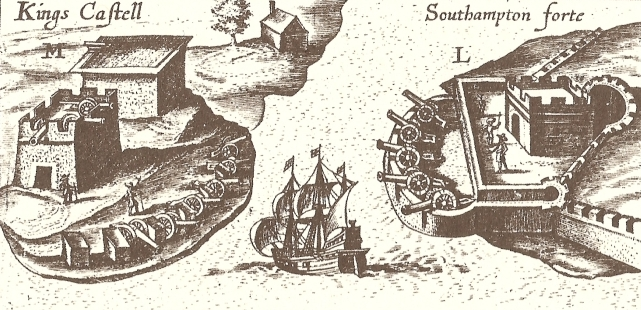
Illustration from John Smith's 1624 map of Bermuda, from The Generall Historie of Virginia, New-England, and the Summer Isles, showing Castle Roads.

Castle Roads is the primary channel by which vessels enter Castle Harbour, Bermuda, from the Atlantic Ocean. Although little used today, except by pleasure boats, Castle Harbour was once an important anchorage, and an access route used by ships to reach the still important St. George's Harbour. The infilling of waterways between St. David's Island and Long Bird Island in the 1940s, as well as the Causeway joining the contiguous landmass so created (which the causeway predates) means only small boats can pass between the two Harbours, today. It was once common to use the term roads in reference to a waterway. Other examples include Hampton Roads, in Virginia, and Lahaina Roads, in Hawaii.

Detail from a 19th-century map

There is a string of islands and rocks across the South mouth of Castle Harbour, and Castle Roads is the largest channel through these, and the only one suitable as a channel for larger vessels. Historically, Castle Roads was defended by four 17th-century forts, King's Castle, Devonshire Redoubt, Charles Fort, and Southampton Fort. These were most of the forts arrayed across the islands of Castle Harbour (though not all on Castle Island, Bermuda, known collectively as the Castle Islands Fortifications. Together with St. George's Town, on neighbouring St. George's Harbour, and other nearby 17th-century fortifications, the Castle Islands fortifications are a UNESCO World Heritage Site.
