= L.F. Wade International Airport =

International airport serving Bermuda

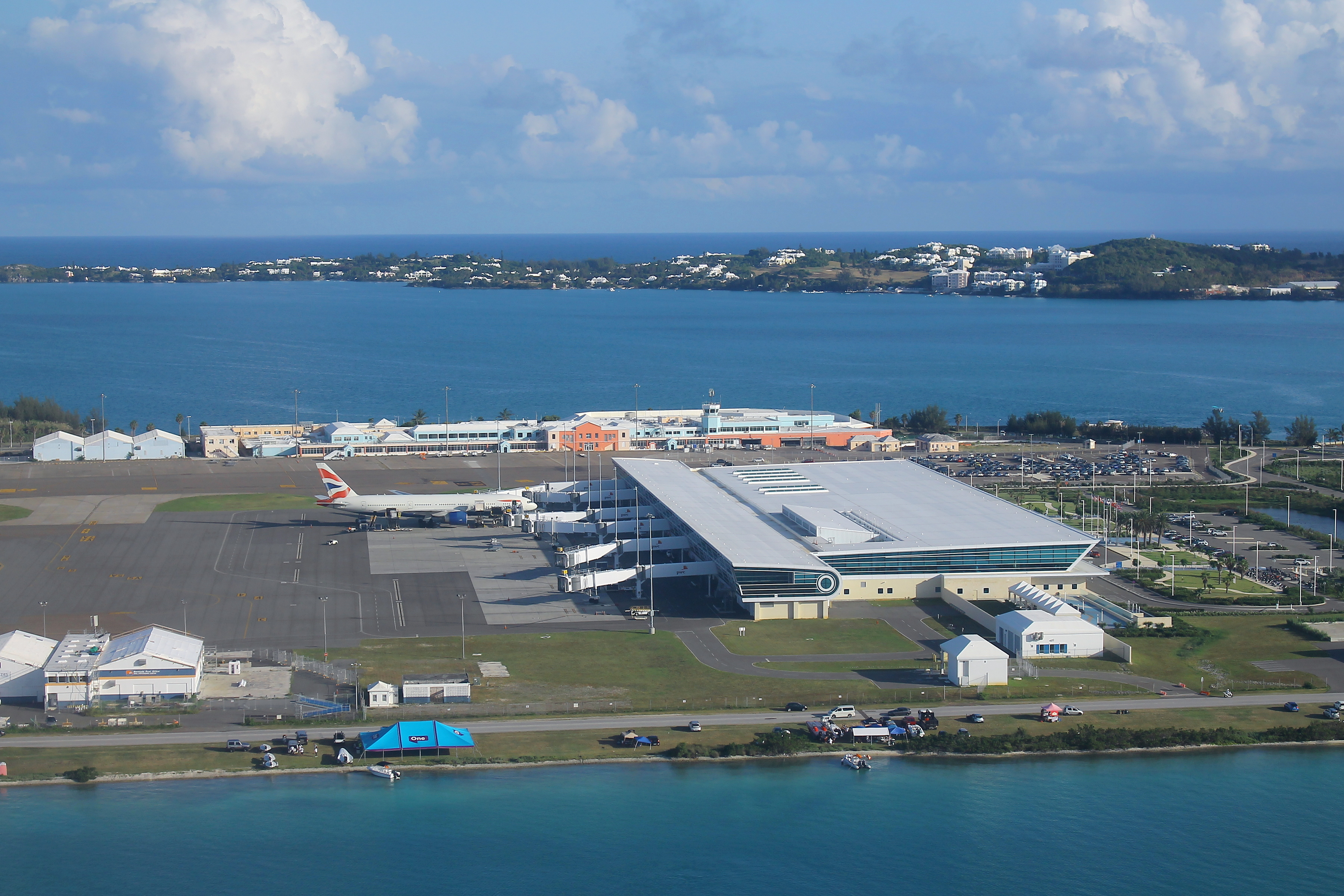
- IATA: BDA; ICAO: TXKF

Summary
- Airport type: Public
- Owner: Government of Bermuda
- Operator: Bermuda Skyport Corporation Limited
- Serves: Bermuda
- Location: St. David's Island
- Hub for: BermudAir
- Elevation AMSL: 18 ft (5.5 m)
- Coordinates: 32°21′51″N 064°40′43″W
- Website: bermudaairport.com

Map
- Location of airport in Bermuda BDA (North Atlantic)

Runways
Direction	Length		Surface
Direction	ft	m	Surface
12/30	9,705	2,958	Asphalt
- Source: Bermuda AIP

L.F. Wade International Airport (IATA: BDA, ICAO: TXKF), formerly named Bermuda International Airport, is the sole airport serving the British overseas territory of Bermuda in the north Atlantic Ocean. It is located in the parish of St. George's and is 6 nautical miles (11 kilometres; 6.9 miles) northeast of Bermuda's capital, Hamilton. In 2016, the airport handled 402,925 passengers, up 5.6% from 2006. It has one passenger terminal, one cargo terminal, eight aircraft stands and can support all aircraft sizes up to and including the Airbus A380. Currently, nine passenger or cargo airlines operate seasonal or year-round scheduled services from the Azores, Canada, the United Kingdom, and the United States. The airport covers 536 acres (217 ha) of land and contains one runway.

== History ==
The airfield was constructed during World War II for use as Kindley Field, a joint US Army Air Forces (USAAF)/Royal Air Force (RAF) base. The RAF forces in Bermuda were withdrawn at the end of the War. The local RAF Commander, however, stayed on, on loan to the Bermuda Government. He converted the RAF facilities into the Civil Air Terminal, operated by the local government. When the pre-war airport, a flying boat facility on Darrell's Island, closed in 1948, Bermuda's air routes were taken over by land planes operating through the airfield.

By then it was operated by the United States Air Force, as Kindley Air Force Base. In 1970, the field was transferred to the United States Navy, which operated it as US Naval Air Station, Bermuda until 1995. The US Navy terminated its 99-year lease and transferred the field to the Bermuda Government. It now operates the airport as part of the Ministry of Tourism & Transport.

The US Navy was not required to meet international civil air standards, despite the operation of civil airlines to the base. The Bermuda Government, however, was required to meet these standards very quickly on assuming control, and at some expense. This involved changes to the airfield lighting, erecting new fences, levelling anything over a certain height and within a certain distance of the runway (including the former base commander's residence, and the hill it stood on), and other changes.

The airport is at the west of St. David's Island, and to the south of Ferry Reach. This places it in the East End of the archipelago, several miles from the capital, Hamilton.

The airfield was built between 1941 and 1943 by levelling Long Bird Island and several smaller islands and filling in the waterways with reclaimed land between them and St. David's Island. This created a landmass contiguous with St. David's. The airfield is typically described as being in, or on, St. David's. The field originally had three runways, but only the longest is still in use. One of the others, most of which is on a narrow peninsula jutting into Castle Harbour, has been blocked by munitions bunkers that were built at the harbour end.

Additional bunkers are on the west side of the peninsula, which the US Navy had referred to as the Weapons Pier. Airport workers, today, refer to it as The Finger. The other former runway is today a taxiway to connect aprons one and two to the active runway, and the taxiway which parallels it. This was last used as a runway in 1978. It has its own former taxiway paralleling it, which now serves as a dispersal area for visiting aircraft.

On 16 April 2007 the airport was renamed as "L.F. Wade International Airport" in honour of L. Frederick Wade, a former leader of the incumbent governing party (the Progressive Labour Party) when it was in opposition. The name was criticised by the opposition United Bermuda Party for being politically biased.

On 16 March 2017, the Government of Bermuda signed an agreement with the Canadian Commercial Corporation, granting Skyport a 30-year concession to manage and operate the airport.

In December 2020, a new terminal was completed, replacing the previous one.

== Current operations ==
In 2017, the airport handled almost five hundred thousand passengers. Airline flight arrivals and departures usually peak June – August summer season. It has received high marks in passenger satisfaction surveys, placing first among North American airports in the "Under 15 million passengers" category in 2003 and fourth worldwide in its size category, according to the global airport monitor report that year. Cited were courtesy of staff, security, and check-in facilities.

The former NATO hangar built in the early 1990s is now used for the airport's growing corporate jet traffic. Because of Bermuda's considerable distance from the nearest land mass, the airport's use by General Aviation aircraft is limited to jets and long-range turboprops. Only jet fuel is available.

The airport offers US Customs and Immigration preclearance, which means US-bound passengers clear Customs in Bermuda; flights arriving in the US from Bermuda are thus treated as domestic flights.

Air traffic control service is provided by CI2 Aviation under contract to Bermuda Skyport Corporation. The control tower is located on the north side of the airport (not to be confused with the old tower located at the terminal building) and provides service for most of the day and night. Approach, departure and en route traffic control in the surrounding Oceanic Sector is provided by New York Air Route Traffic Control Center (ZNY), under an agreement between the US Government's Federal Aviation Administration and the United Kingdom. The BDA tower controller and ZNY center controller are always in close contact. Remote radio transmitters and air traffic radar coverage at the airport also link Bermuda and New York Center.

A modern Doppler Weather radar with a 150-mile (240 km) range was built by the DAO in 2005. Navaids at the airport, such as the Instrument Landing System (ILS) and VOR (VHF omnidirectional range), are owned by Skyport but maintained by CI2 Aviation.

The airport was a United States government NASA Space Shuttle launch abort site. It was only used during low and mid inclination launches.

The airport is also active in affairs of the Airports Council International (ACI), hosting the industry organisation's Legal Affairs Committee annual meeting in 2005. In 2006, ACI selected the airport to host its World Assembly, which was held in Bermuda in November 2010, attended by hundreds of delegates representing airports worldwide. The airport's current general manager is Aaron Adderley.

A small portion of the south-east corner of the airport was transformed in the 1990s into Bermuda Motorsports Park.

Since March 2017, Bermuda Skyport Corporation Limited has managed and operated L.F. Wade International. The 30-year airport concession includes construction of a new passenger terminal, which was completed in 2020.

== Airport agencies ==
- Bermuda Skyport Corporation Limited, the airport concessions company
- Bermuda Airport Authority
- The Bermuda Civil Aviation Authority (BCAA), responsible for aircraft registration, safety regulation, and accident investigation
- Bermuda Immigration
- HM Revenue and Customs
- U.S. Customs and Border Protection, pre-clears passengers on most flights to the US
- Airport Rescue Firefighting (ARFF), operated by Bermuda Fire Service from 2007
- Bermuda Fire Service, west-end station sits astride perimeter, and provides support to ARFF
- Airport Security Police, enforces airside regulations and security under contract to the DAO
- Bermuda Police Service, enforces landside parking and traffic regulations, and holds arrested persons
- Bermuda Weather Service, operated by Serco under contract to the DAO

== Airlines and destinations ==
=== Passenger ===
Airlines	Destinations
Air Canada Rouge	Toronto–Pearson
American Airlines	Charlotte, Miami, New York–JFK; Seasonal: Philadelphia
BermudAir	Baltimore, Boston, Halifax, Montréal–Trudeau, Newark, Toronto–Pearson, White Plains; Seasonal: Fort Lauderdale (resumes 20 December 2026), Grand Cayman (begins 18 December 2026), Orlando/Sanford, Providenciales (begins 18 December 2026)
British Airways	London–Heathrow
Delta Air Lines	Atlanta, New York–LaGuardia
JetBlue	Boston; Seasonal: New York–JFK
United Airlines	Newark; Seasonal: Chicago–O'Hare (begins April 3, 2027)

Canadian and European destinations map
Canadian and European destinations from L.F. Wade International Airport
Red = Year-round destination
Green = Seasonal destination

United States destinations map
United States destinations from L.F. Wade International Airport
Red = Year-round destination
Green = Seasonal destination
Blue = Future destination

=== Cargo ===
Airlines	Destinations
Cargojet	Newark

== Accidents and incidents ==
- On 6 December 1952, a Cubana de Aviación DC-4 crashed after taking off from the airport, killing 37 passengers out of 41 passengers and crew.
- On 27 October 1962, a U.S. Air Force Boeing RB-47 Stratojet crashed on takeoff, killing all four crew members on board.
- On 29 June 1964, a USAF Boeing KC-97 Stratofreighter collided with a USAF Douglas C-54 Skymaster 4.1 miles S of Bermuda during a photography mission to support the Gemini program for NASA. All 10 occupants on the KC-97 perished as well as all seven occupants on the C-54 Skymaster.

== See also ==
- Royal Air Force, Bermuda (1939–45)
- Hurricane Fabian
- Hurricane Igor
- Transport in Bermuda
- The Causeway, Bermuda
- Hurricane Gonzalo
