= Bermuda Motorsports Park =

Motor racing circuit in St. David's Island, Bermuda

Coordinates: 32.358°N 64.663°W

- Location: St. David's Island, Bermuda
- Major events: Motorcycle racing Kart racing

Bermuda Motorsports Park is a small motor racing circuit located in St. David's Island, Bermuda. It plays host to a variety of motorsport events, primarily motorcycle racing and kart racing but also motocross with a small infield dirt section.

The circuit itself is a multi-layout venue located at the eastern end of L.F. Wade International Airport, Bermuda's only airfield. The circuit is the home of the Bermuda Motorcycle Racing Club which was formed in the 1990s.
