= Kindley Air Force Base =

Former United States Air Force base in Bermuda

- St. David's Island, Bermuda; Near St. George's, Bermuda in United States
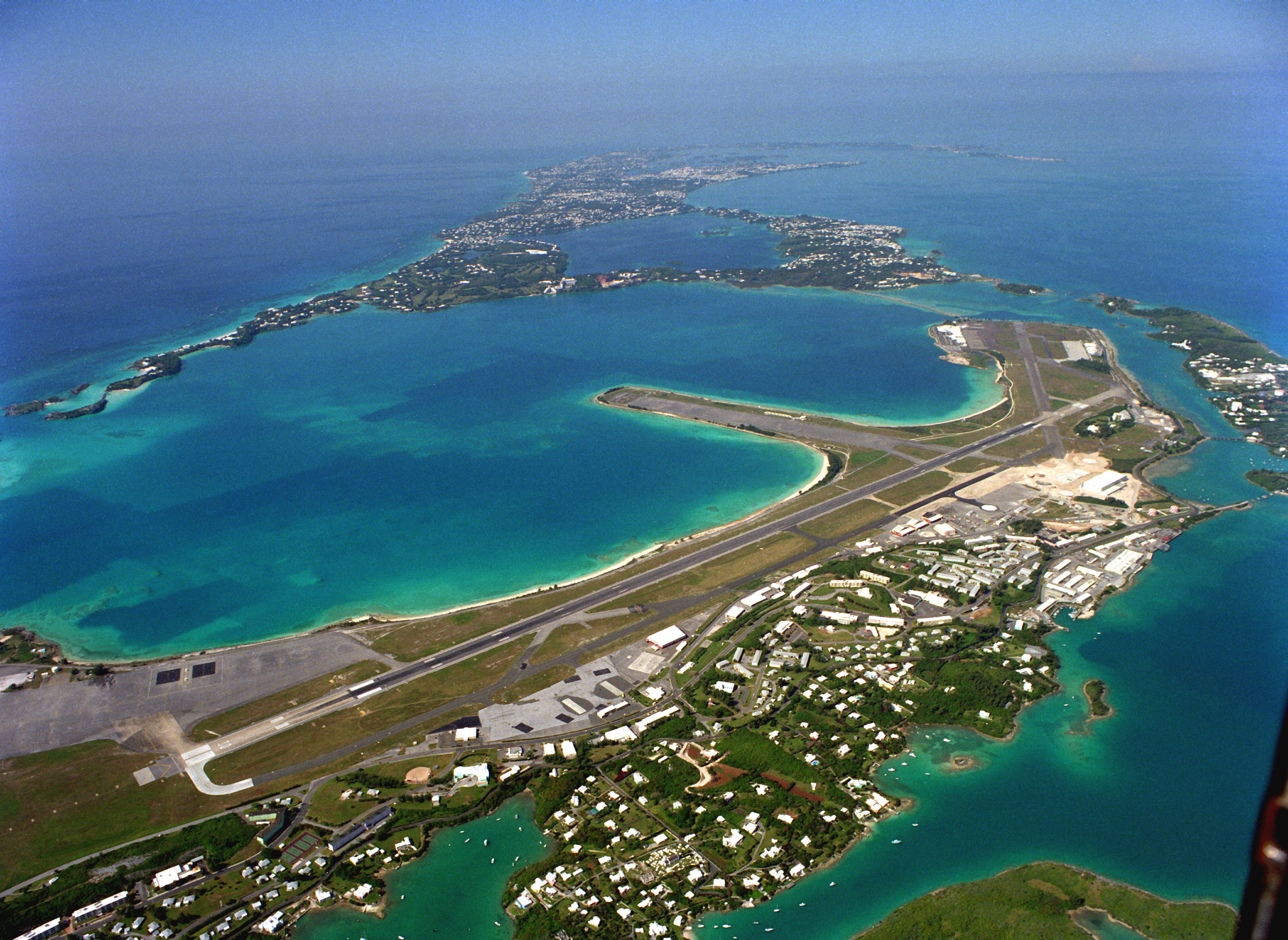
- The former AFB Kindley Field, as it appeared in 1993

Site information
- Type: Air force base
- Owner: United States (1940-1995); Government of Bermuda (current)
- Operator: Joint USAAF and RAF (1943-1945); United States Air Force (1945-1970); United States Navy (1970-1995)
- Open to the public: Yes
- Condition: Operational - returned to the Bermudian government for use as L.F. Wade International Airport

Location
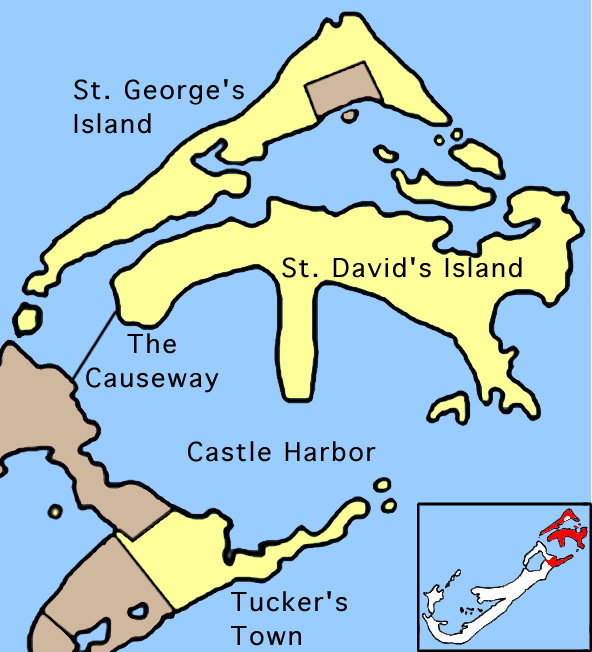
- St. David's Island, after the construction of the airfield. The airfield encompasses all of the Island.
- St. David's Island, after the construction of the airfield. The airfield encompasses all of the Island.
- Coordinates: 32°21′52.3″N 64°40′53.5″W

Site history
- Built: 1941–1943
- In use: 1943–1995
- Fate: Returned to the Bermudian government for use as L.F. Wade International Airport
- Battles/wars: World War II

Airfield information
- Identifiers: IATA: BDA, ICAO: TXKF
- Elevation: 12 feet (4 m) AMSL
Runways
Direction	Length and surface
12/30	9,898 feet (3,017 m) Asphalt

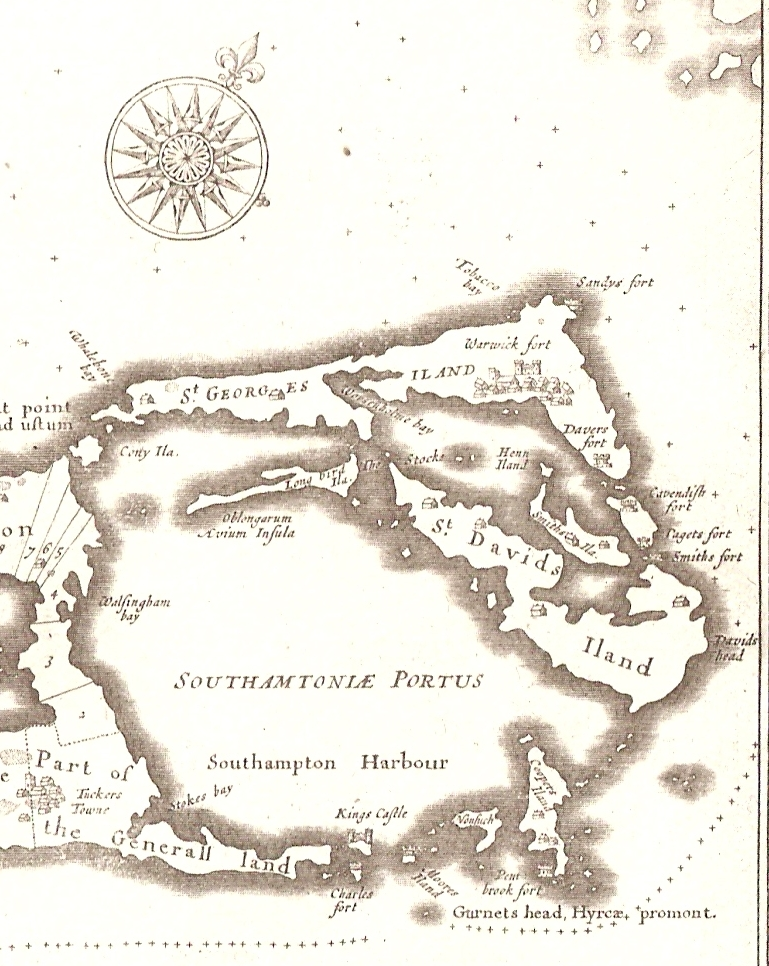
St. David's, in 1676. The shape of St. David's Island, and of Castle Harbour (originally Southampton Harbour), was radically altered by the construction of the airfield, which began in 1941.

Kindley Air Force Base was a United States Air Force base in Bermuda from 1948–1970, having been operated from 1943 to 1948 by the United States Army Air Forces as Kindley Field.

== History ==
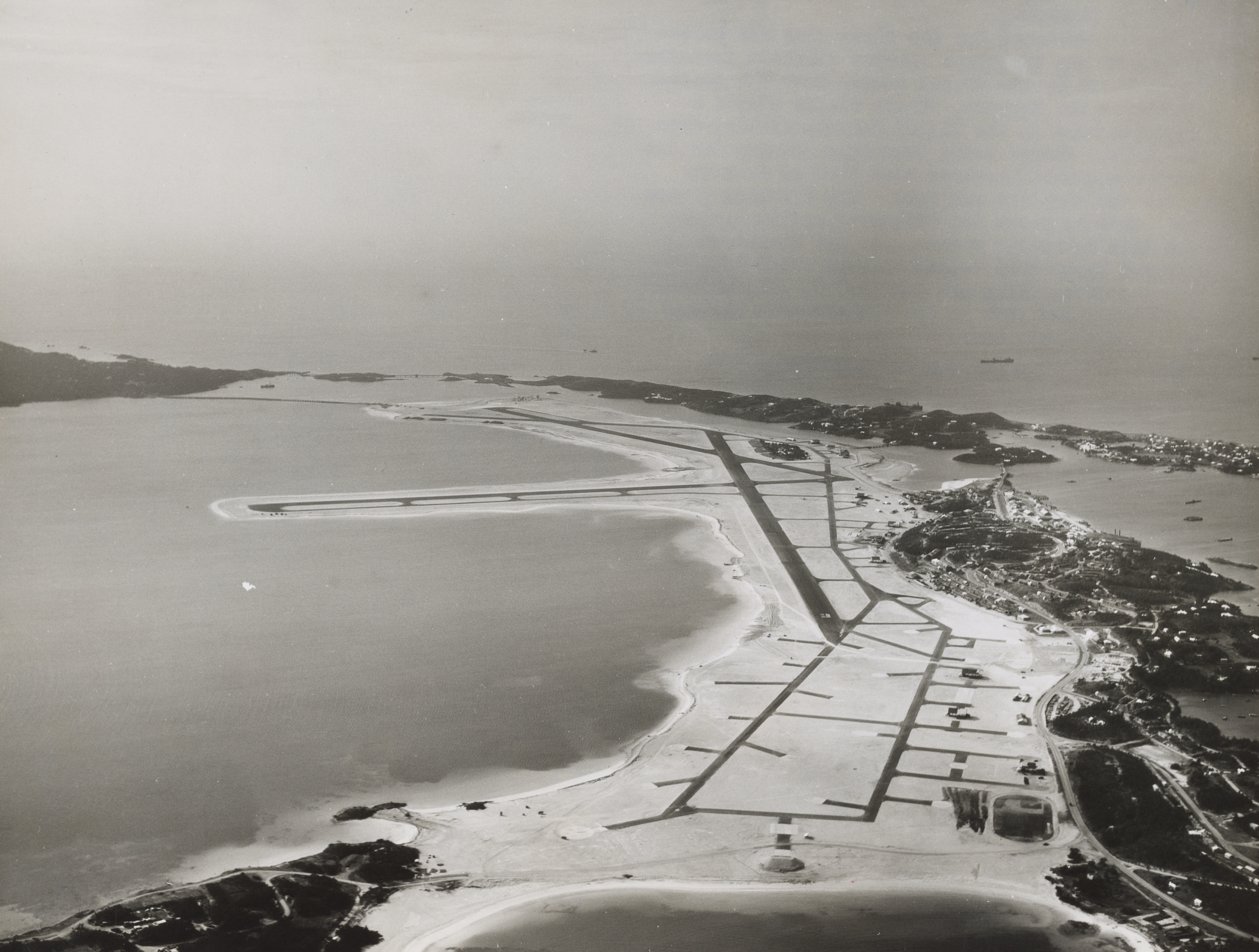
Kindley Field, shortly after construction

=== World War II ===
Prior to American entry into the Second World War, the governments of the United Kingdom and the US led by Prime Minister Winston Churchill and President Roosevelt came to an agreement exchanging a number of obsolete ex-US Naval destroyers for 99-year base rights in a number of British Empire West Indian territories. Bases were also granted in Bermuda and Newfoundland, though Britain received no loans in exchange for these. This was known as the destroyers for bases deal.

As the government of Bermuda had not been party to the agreement, the arrival of US engineers in 1941 came as rather a surprise to many in Bermuda. The US engineers began surveying the colony for the construction of an airfield that was envisioned as taking over most of the West End of the Island. Frantic protests to London by the Governor and local politicians led to those plans being revised. The US Army would build an airfield at the north of Castle Harbour. The US Navy would build a flying boat station at the West End.

The airfield was intended to be a joint US Army Air Forces/Royal Air Force facility, to be used by both primarily as a staging point for trans-Atlantic flights by landplanes. When the US Army occupied the area, it created Fort Bell, with Kindley Field (named in honour of an American pilot, Field E. Kindley, who had served with the Royal Flying Corps during World War I), being the airfield within it.

There were two air stations operating in Bermuda at the start of the Second World War, the civil airport on Darrell's Island, which was taken over by the Royal Air Force for the duration, and the Royal Naval Air Station on Royal Naval Air Station Bermuda on Boaz Island. Both were limited to operating flying boats, as Bermuda's limited and hilly landmass offered no obvious site for an airfield. The US Army succeeded in building the airfield by levelling small islands and infilling the waterways between (at the West End, the U.S. Navy used the same methods to create its Naval Air Station, which—like the British bases—was restricted to use by seaplanes).

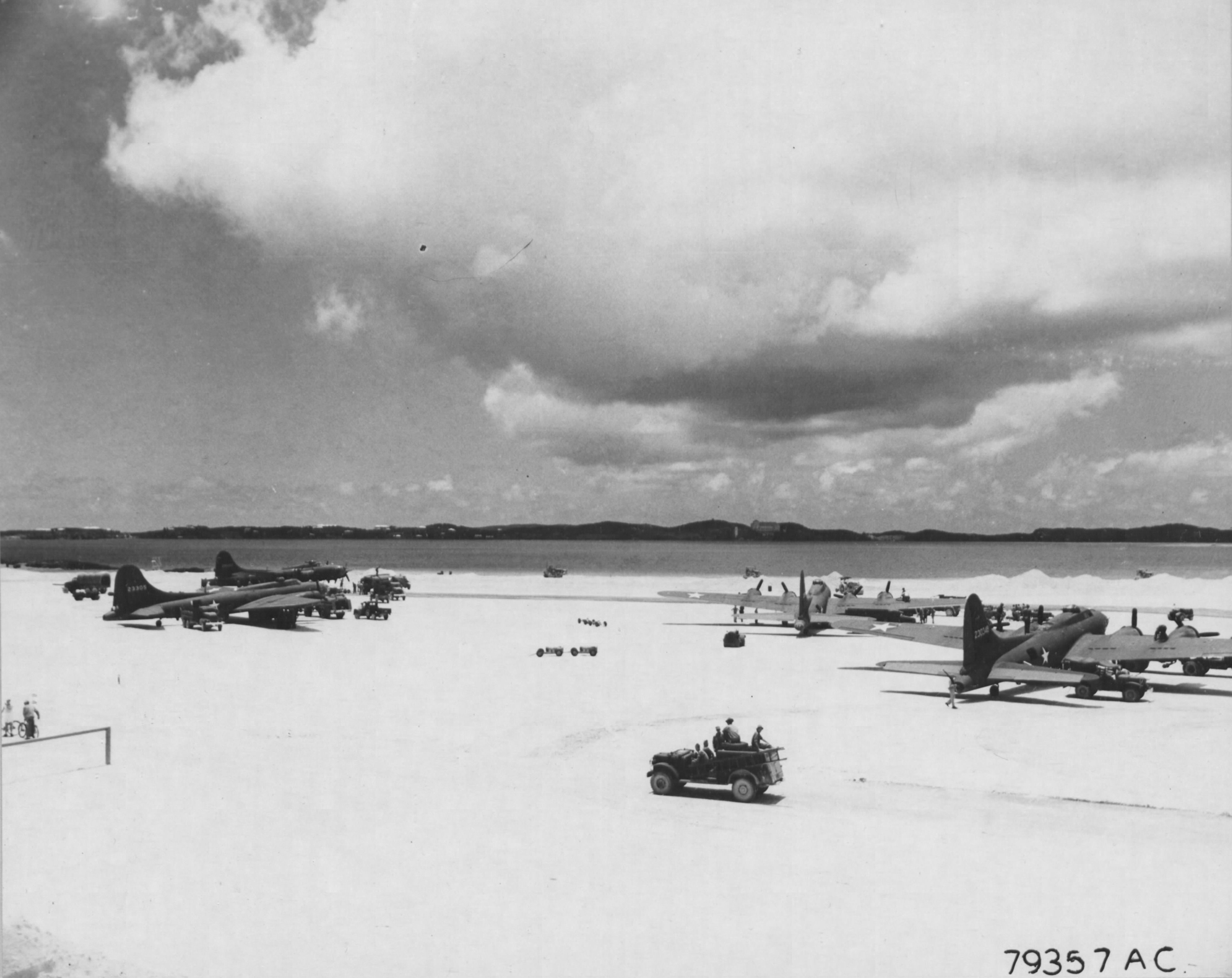
USAAF 390th Bomb Group B-17s, in transit from the US to UK, at Kindley Field on the 22 June, 1943

The US Army levelled Longbird Island, and smaller islands (Cave Island, Cooper's Island, Long Island, Westcott Island) at the north of Castle Harbour, infilling waterways and part of the harbour to make a land-mass contiguous with St. David's Island and Cooper's Island. This added 750 acres (3 km^{2}) to Bermuda's land mass, bringing the total area of the base to 1,165 acres (4.7 km^{2}). The area had already been in use for centuries by the British Army, with islands across the southern mouth of Castle Harbour, including Cooper's Island, housing obsolete fortified coastal batteries (the US Army placed a modern coastal artillery battery on Cooper's Island, though this was removed at the end of the Second World War), a rifle range on Cooper's Island, and a tent camp on St. David's Island for the infantry guarding nearby St David's Battery was relocated nearer the battery as the underlying land became part of Fort Bell. The airfield was completed in 1943, and known as Kindley Field after World War I aviator Field E. Kindley. Most of the base was taken up by the US Army Air Forces. The northern end of the airfield, near the causeway, was taken up by the Royal Air Force and Royal Navy Fleet Air Arm. The first aircraft to operate from the airfield were Blackburn Roc target tugs of 773 Fleet Requirements Unit, FAA, which had been formed at RNAS Bermuda on the 3 June 1940. These monoplanes were normally meant to operate from carrier decks, and had retractable undercarriage. To operate from RNAS Bermuda, which was only able to handle flyingboats and floatplanes, they had been fitted with floats, but they were stripped of their floats and moved to Kindley Field as soon as the first runway became operational later in 1943. They towed targets for anti-aircraft gunnery practice by Allied vessels working-up at Bermuda, as well as for a United States Navy anti-aircraft gunnery training centre operating on shore at Warwick Parish for the duration of the war. RAF Transport Command, formerly based at Darrell's Island, re-located to the landplane base, leaving only RAF Ferry Command operating on Darrell's.

=== Postwar use ===
The US Army was left as the only military establishment on the base after both RAF establishments (at Kindley Field and Darrell's Island) were withdrawn at the end of the war (followed by the closure of most of the Royal Naval Dockyard and withdrawal of the last regular British Army unit in the 1950s), although the RAF (and the Royal Navy Fleet Air Arm) has continued to use its end of the field, converted to a Civil Aviation Terminal by the Civil Aviation department of the Bermuda Government (headed by wartime RAF commander Wing Commander Mo Ware), as a staging post for trans-Atlantic flights.

The United States Army garrisoned Bermuda with ground forces for the remainder of the war, including Fort Bell. Following the end of hostilities, its ground forces were withdrawn, other than those required for the defence of Fort Bell, on 1 January 1946, when US Army Air Transport Command took control of the entire base. The airfield ceased to be distinguished within the base as the name Fort Bell was discontinued and Kindley Field came to be applied to the entire facility.

In 1947, it was decided to separate the U.S. Army Air Forces from the U.S. Army to create a separate air service, the United States Air Force (USAF). Fort Bell lost its distinction from Kindley Field at that time and the entire base was renamed Kindley Air Force Base (although some civilians still refer to it as Kindley Field). The USAF continued to operate the base, primarily as a refuelling station for trans-Atlantic flights by Military Air Transport Service (MATS) and Strategic Air Command (SAC) aircraft.

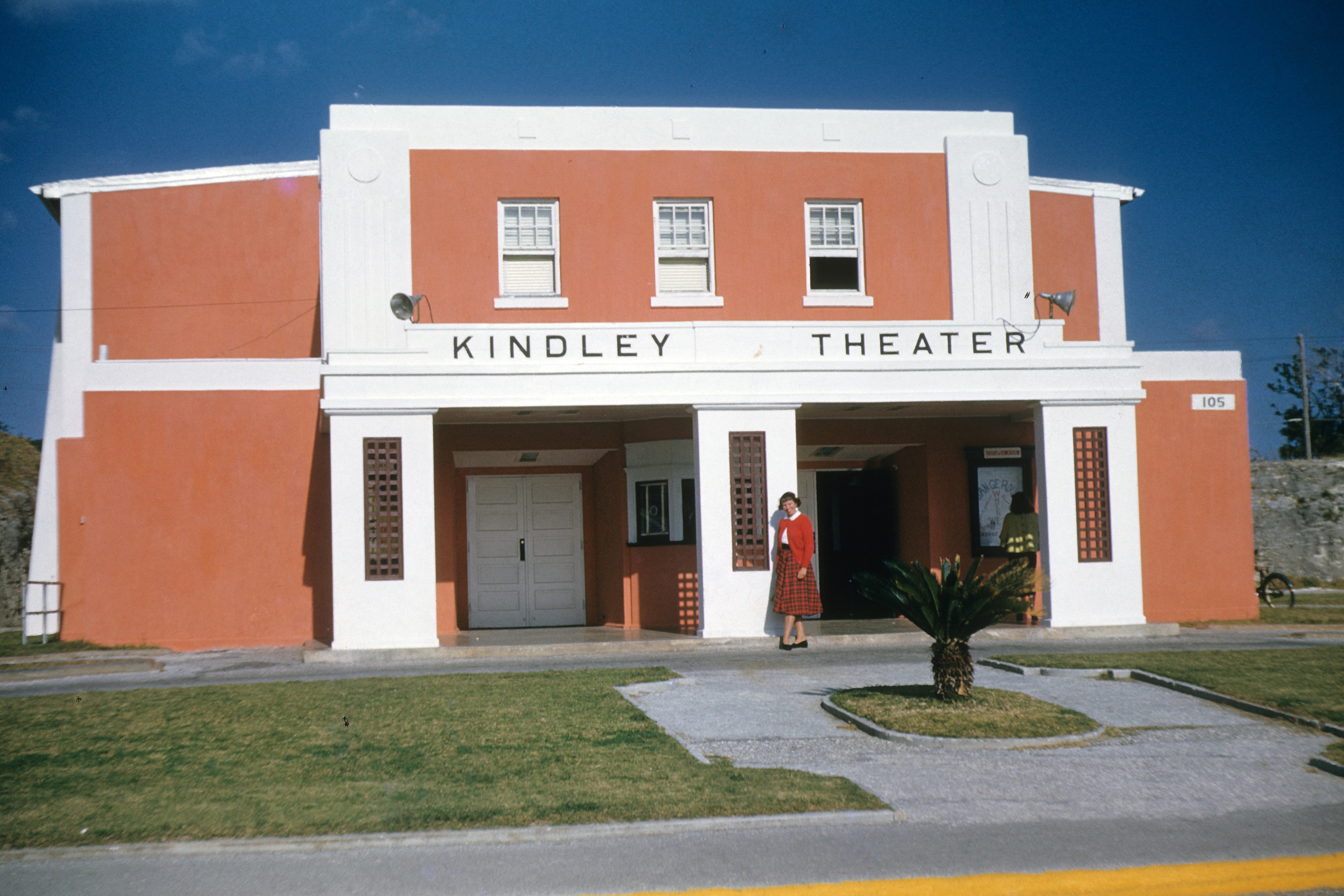
Theater at Kindley AFB in early 1953

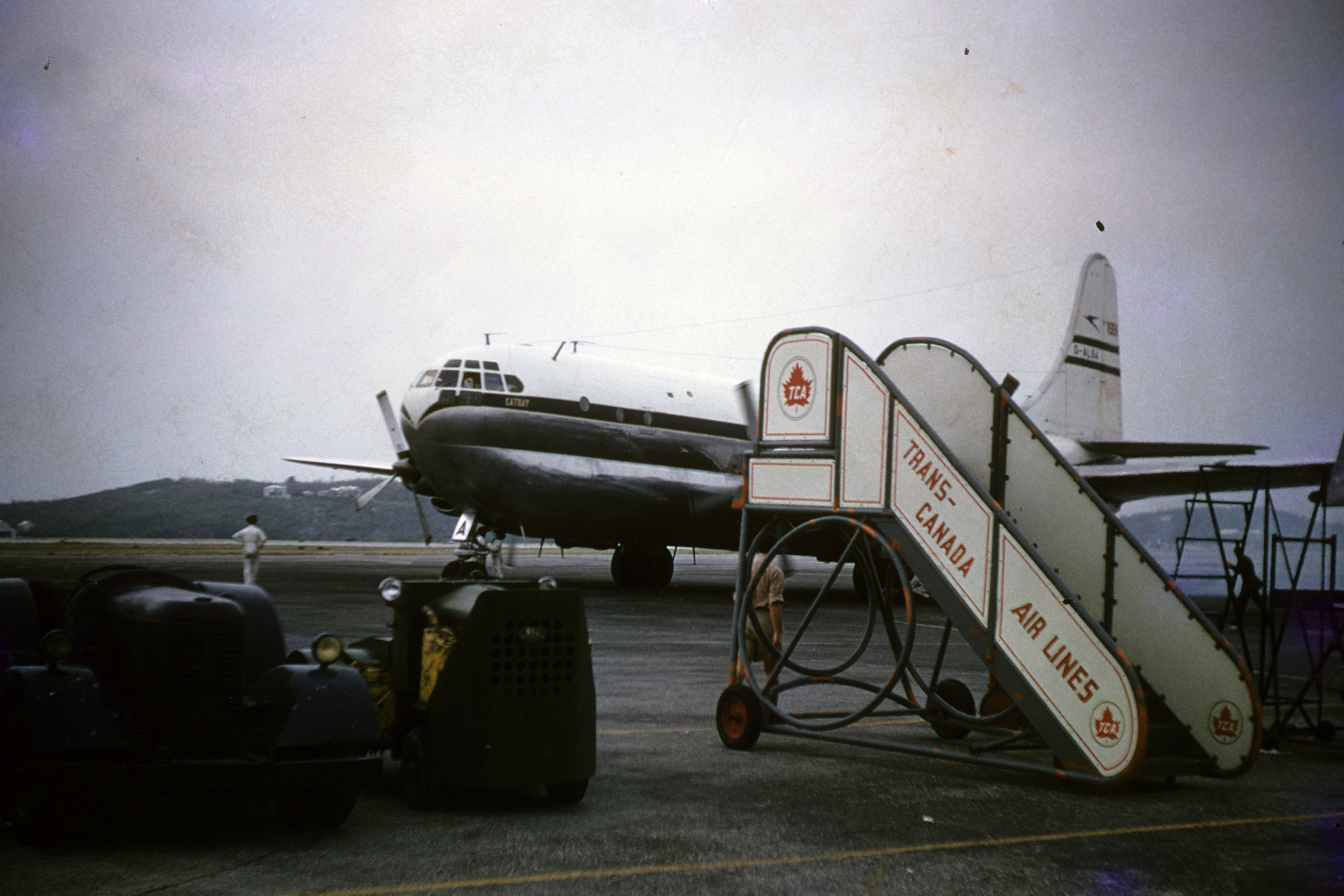
Boeing 377 Stratocruiser Cathay at Kindley AFB Bermuda in December 1953

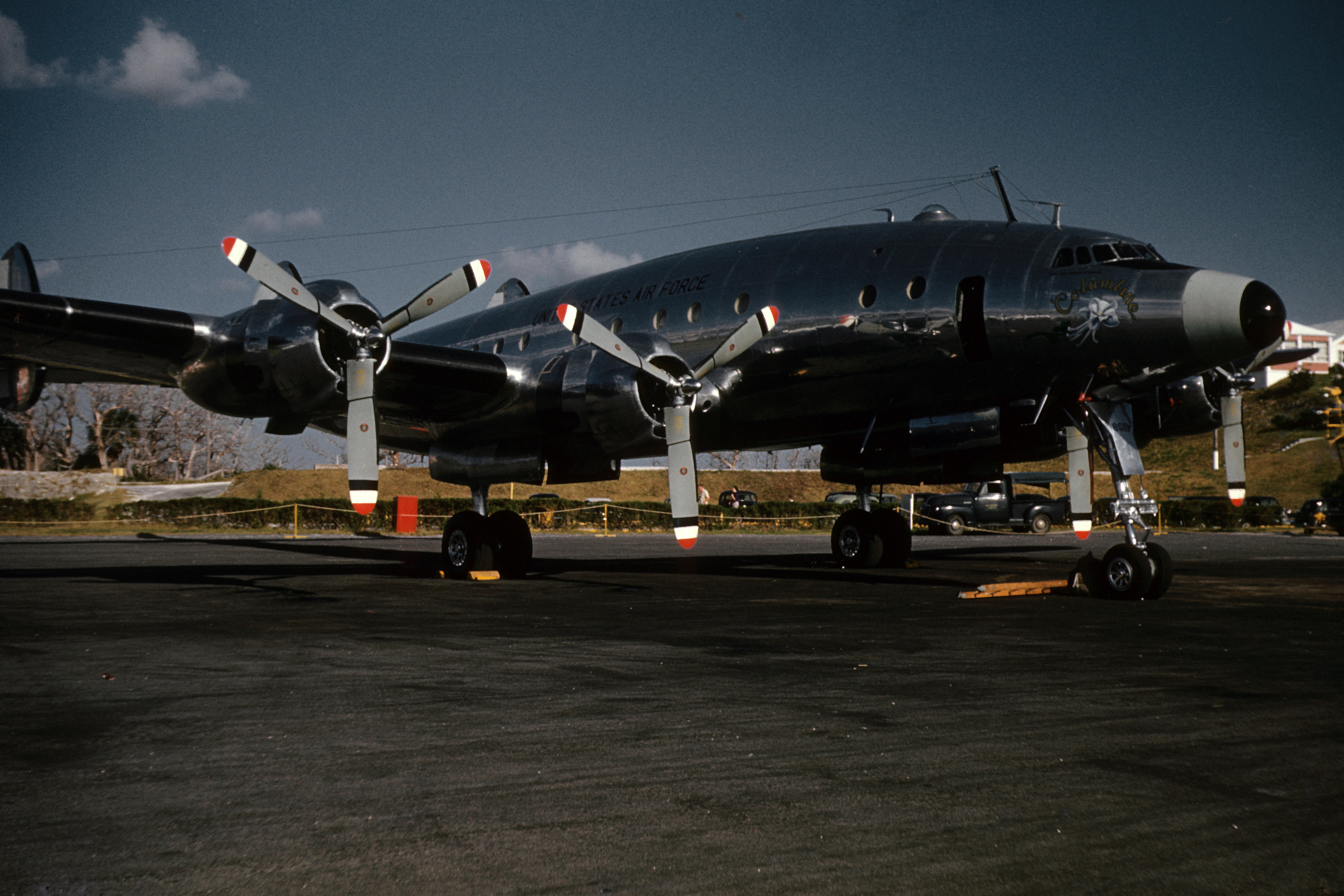
Lockheed Constellation Columbine II during President Eisenhower's visit to Bermuda for the December 1953 Western Summit

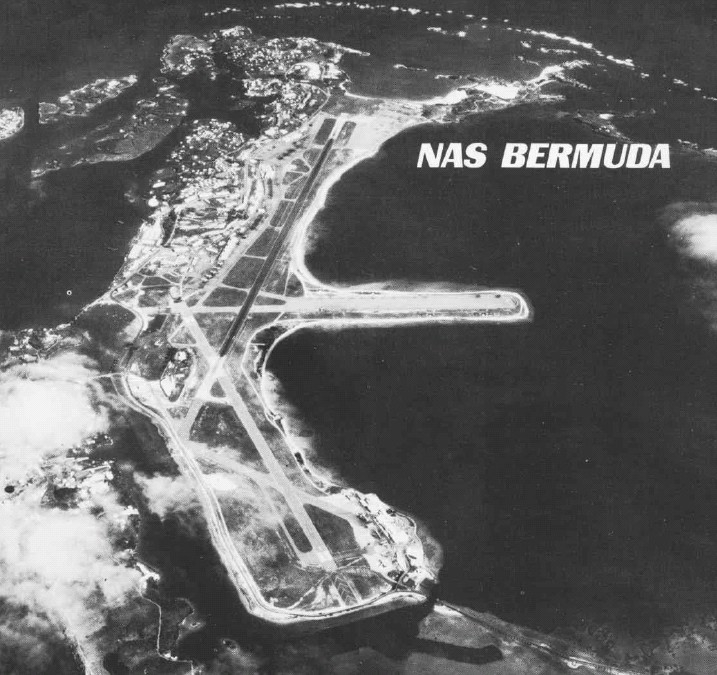
Kindley AFB as U.S. Naval Air Station Bermuda, 1970

During the Cuban Missile Crisis, the base was also used to operate land-based U.S. Navy P-2 Neptune and P-3A Orion reconnaissance flights by aeroplanes tracking Soviet shipping in the Atlantic. By the 1960s, with the increase in ranges of transport aircraft, Kindley Field's usefulness to the USAF had rapidly diminished.

At the same time, the U.S. Navy was still operating anti-submarine air patrols with P5M/SP-5B Marlin seaplanes from NAS Bermuda at the West End. Whereas the Second World War air patrols had protected merchant shipping in the Atlantic, the Cold War patrols aimed to guard US cities from Soviet submarines armed with ballistic missiles with nuclear warheads. The Martin flying boats the Navy had used since the 1950s were withdrawn and replaced by landplanes. In 1965, the US Navy moved its air operations to Kindley Field, flying land-based SP-2H Neptune and P-3 Orion aircraft. With the airfield having attained vastly greater importance to naval operations, it was permanently transferred to custody of the U.S. Navy in 1970, operating until 1995 as U.S. Naval Air Station Bermuda.

During the latter stages of the Cold War, the U.S. Navy would normally station an entire patrol squadron consisting of nine P-3C Orion aircraft on six-month rotations from their home bases at either NAS Jacksonville, Florida, or NAS Brunswick, Maine. These squadrons were frequently augmented by Naval Air Reserve P-3A or P-3B aircraft from various bases in the eastern United States, as well as NATO/Allied support consisting of Royal Air Force Hawker Siddeley Nimrod MR2s, Canadian Armed Forces CP-140 Auroras and other similar maritime patrol and reconnaissance aircraft from other NATO nations. During one period in 1985 that was characterized by exceptionally heavy Soviet Navy submarine activity off the United States, additional P-3C aircraft from NAS Brunswick and NAS Jacksonville, as well as several U.S. Navy S-3 Viking aircraft, the latter normally a carrier-based ASW platform with a home base of the former NAS Cecil Field near Jacksonville, Florida, were also temporarily deployed to Bermuda in order to augment the forward deployed P-3C squadron.

The previous NAS Bermuda was renamed the NAS Annex and served primarily as a dock area for visiting U.S. naval vessels and as a support facility for the nearby Naval Facility (NAVFAC) Bermuda that supported the Sound Surveillance System (SOSUS) activity. Both bases closed in 1995 and the former Kindley Field became the present Bermuda International Airport.

Since 1962, several sounding rockets were launched from Kindley and the National Aeronautics and Space Administration has operated a tracking and telemetry station on Cooper's Island, at the eastern edge of the former Naval Air Station since the 1960s in support of crewed space flight operations.

== See also ==
- United States Army Bermuda Garrison
- Fort Bell Army Airfield (1941–1948)
- Naval Air Station Bermuda, Kindley Field (1970–1995)
- USCG Air Station Bermuda (1963–1965)
- Royal Air Force, Bermuda, 1939-1945
