= Ferry Reach, Bermuda =

Channel in the north-east of Bermuda

Coordinates: 32°22′03″N 64°42′03″W

Location of Ferry Reach in Bermuda

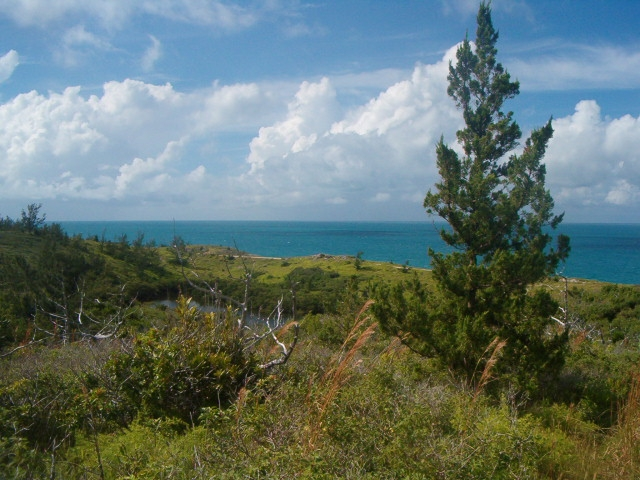
Juvenile Bermuda cedar at Ferry Reach.

Ferry Reach is a three-mile (five kilometre) long channel in the north-east of Bermuda, which lies between St. George's Island in the north and St. David's Island in the south, south-west of the town of St. George's.

It extends south from St. George's Harbour, Bermuda, linking it with Castle Harbour, and is crossed by two bridges at its northern end.

The name also applies to the western end of St. George's Island which lies to the north of this channel, and, more loosely, to the water passage between the western tip (Ferry Point) of this and Coney Island. Three forts had been sited on Ferry point, the most recent being the Martello Tower built, along with a nearby magazine, under the command of Major Thomas Blanshard, RE, in the 1820s. A barracks was built near Ferry Point during the American War of Independence to house a detachment of the Royal Garrison Battalion. The building later became the Ferry Keeper's Cottage (it is still known by this name, although the ferry fell out of use after the Royal Engineers completed the nearby causeway in 1871. The War Department purchased the western 30 acres (120,000 m^{2}) of Ferry Reach in 1846, but the main route from St. George's to the rest of Bermuda remained via the Ferry Road and Ferry Point until the completion of the causeway. The area was used for housing part of the military garrison, primarily under canvas, as a way to minimise the effects of yellow fever, which struck hard in the closely packed barracks. The area was also used for quarantining those infected with yellow fever.

The land area contains two British military cemeteries dating from the yellow fever epidemic of the 1860s. One of them, overlooking the North Shore to the east of Whalebone Bay, is a walled yard containing the graves of soldiers of the 2nd Battalion of the Queen's Royal (West Surrey) Regiment, and of one Royal Engineer, Sapper Aaron Boyes, who died during the epidemic.

Most of the area is, today, a public parkland, but is still used frequently for military training by the Bermuda Regiment. The area is also the site of the only receiving station and storage facility for petroleum fuels delivered to Bermuda, with both Esso and Shell Petroleum maintaining large storage facilities with tanks that are fed from tankers moored well off-shore. The adjacent facilities, known popularly as the Oil Docks, lie on the North Shore, immediately to the east of the public park. Since 2006 the area has been undergoing development for warehouse space freeing up older buildings in developed areas for higher commercial use.

== Gallery ==
Map of Ferry Reach before the area to its south was radically altered in 1941 by the construction of an airfield.

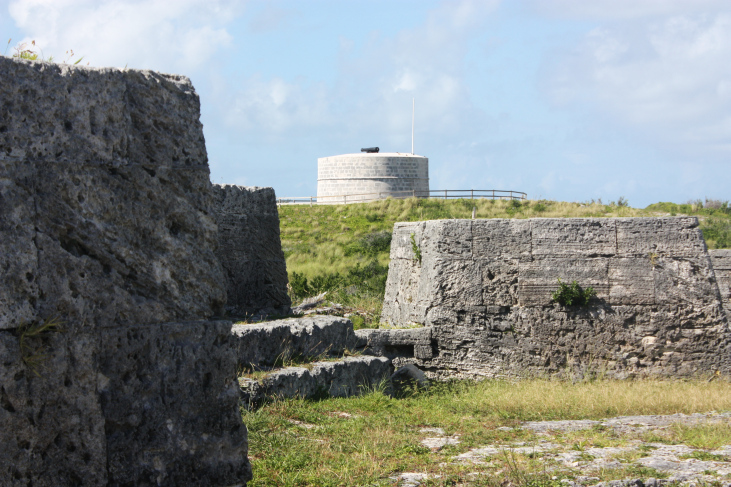
Two of the three forts at Ferry Reach, Ferry Island Fort (in the foreground), and the Martello tower in the background, in 2011. Burnt Point Fort (or Ferry Point Battery), built in 1688, is out of sight, to the left (West).

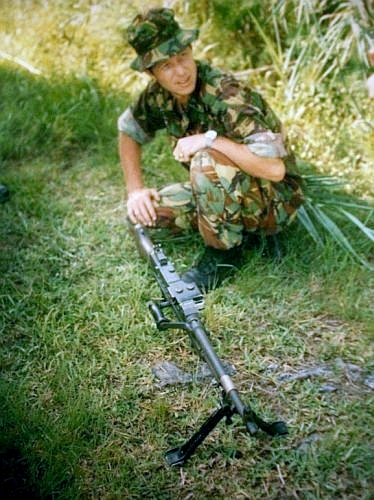
A Bermuda Regiment Warrant Officer, training at Ferry Reach.

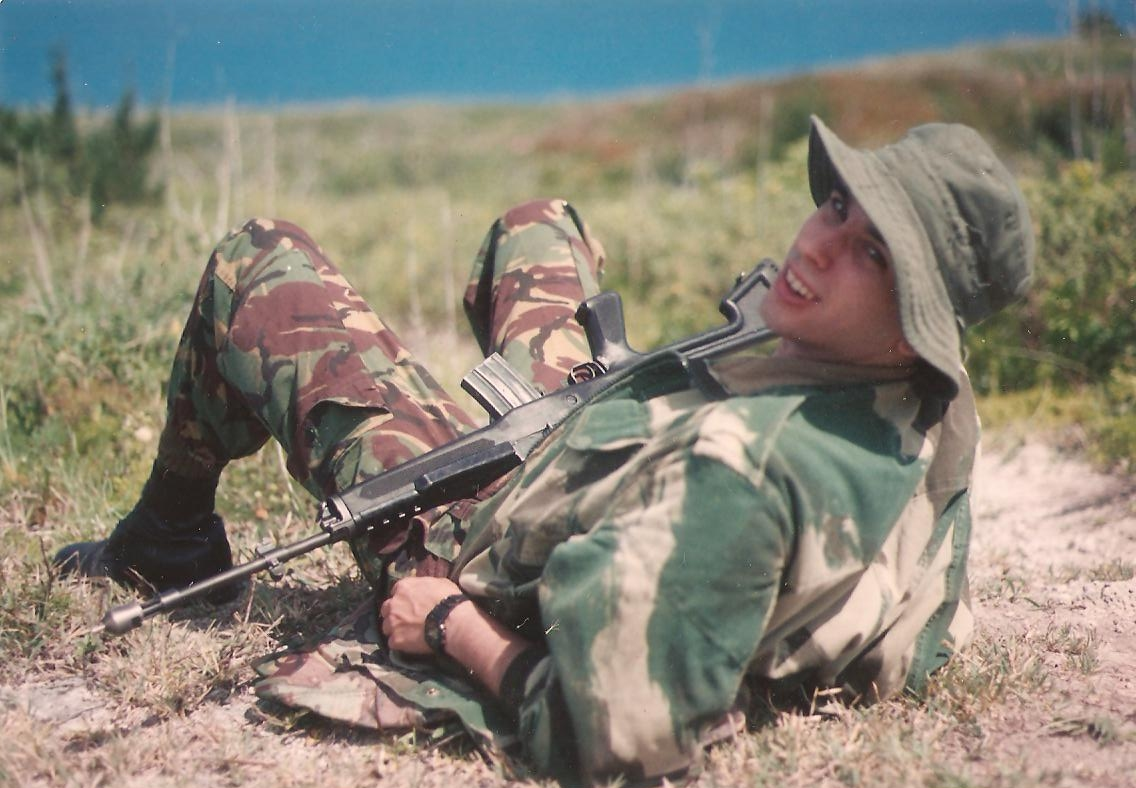
Royal Bermuda Regiment soldier with a Ruger Mini-14 at Ferry Reach in 1994

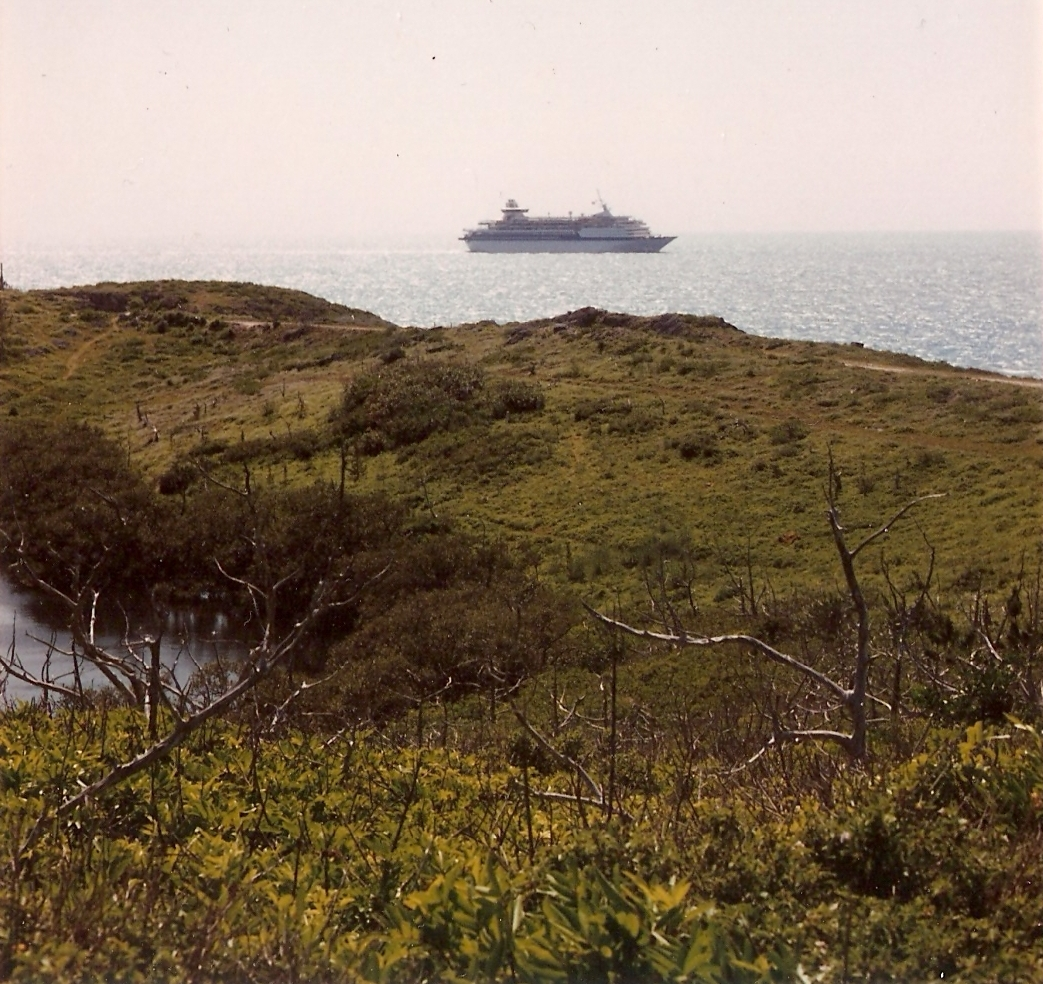
Ferry Reach, looking over the North Shore. Lovers' Lake is visible at the left.

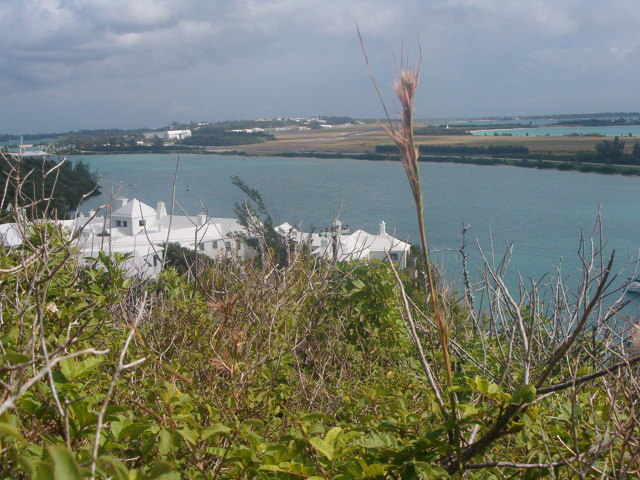
Looking across Ferry Reach towards St. David's. The house in the foreground was originally the home of Vincent Astor, who sold it after the US Army built the Kindley air field, with the glideslope of the main runway passing directly over his roof.
