= Castle Island, Bermuda =

Island in the chain that makes up Bermuda

Coordinates: 32°20′27″N 64°40′19″W

Location of Castle Island in Bermuda

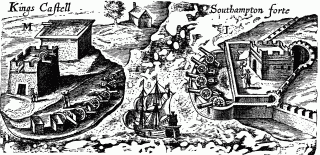
1624 image of Castle Roads, the entrance to Castle Harbour, with Castle Island at the left.

Castle Island is part of the chain which makes up Bermuda. It is located in St. George's Parish, in the northeast of the territory.

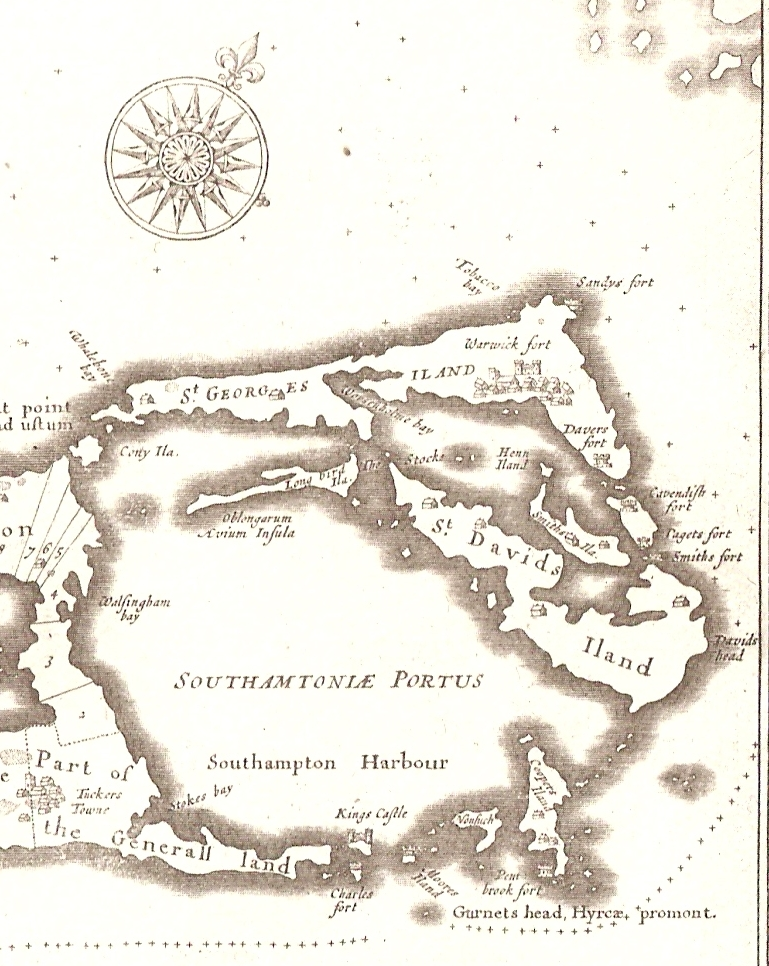
The Parish of St. George's, in 1676. Castle Island lies to the South of Castle Harbour (originally Southampton Harbour).

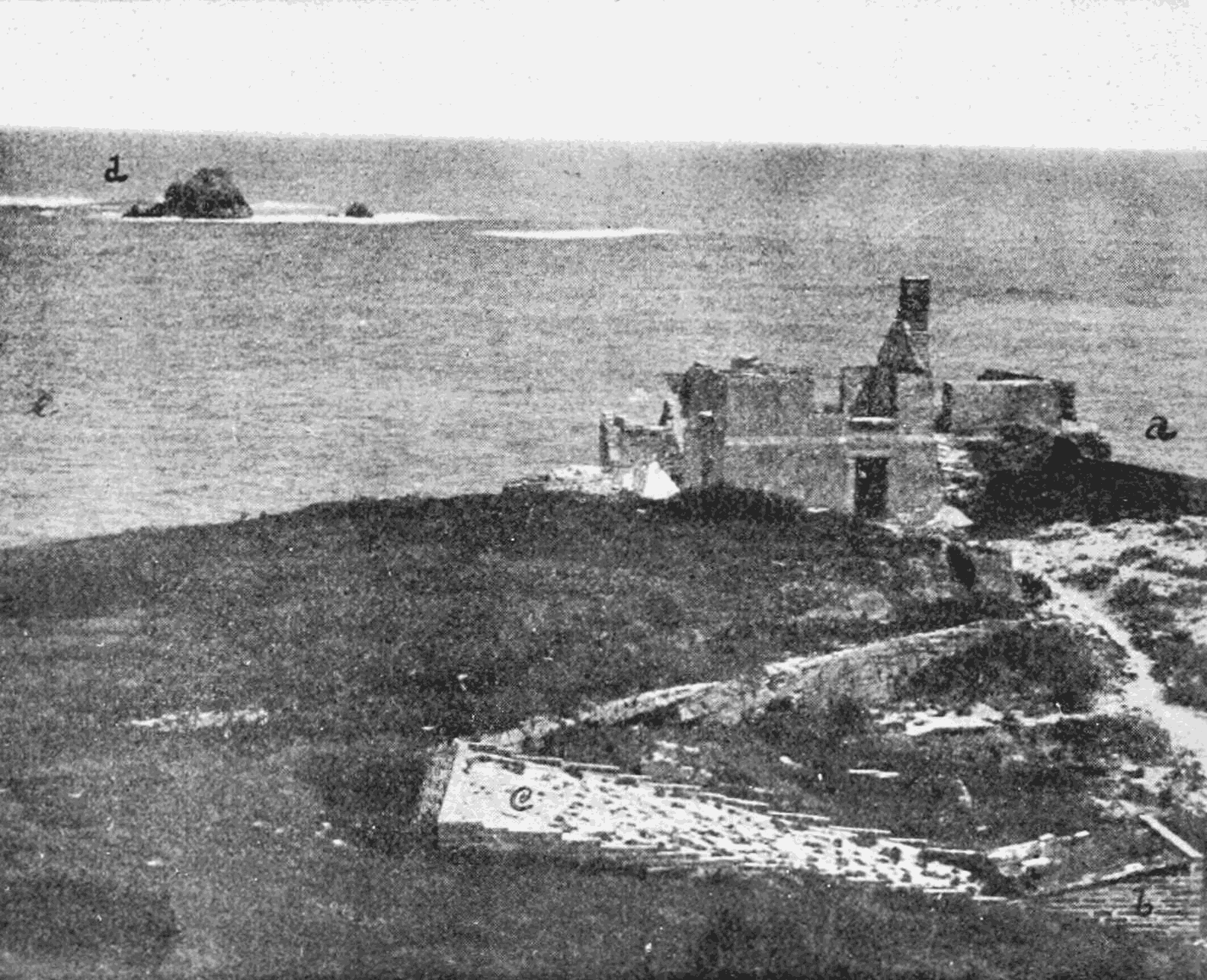
Ruined fort on Castle Island

The 4-acre (1.6-hectare) island is situated close to the entrance to Castle Harbour, to the north of the Tucker's Town Peninsula.

Originally called King's Island, it is of historical significance. The King's Castle stone fortification on the island - which gives the harbour its name - dates to 1612, and is the oldest standing English fortification in the Americas and oldest stone building still in existence in Bermuda. The castle was the site of the successful defence of Bermuda from Spanish attack in 1614.

Several other fortifications from the same period are located on this, and nearby islands. This string of small islands, across the south of Castle Harbour, are known collectively as the Castle Islands. These forts, together with St. George's Town, and other forts in the parish, are part of the UNESCO World Heritage Site, the Historic Town of St George and Related Fortifications.
