= The Causeway, Bermuda =

Narrow strip of reclaimed land and bridges in the north of Bermuda

Coordinates: 32.3586°N 64.7060°W

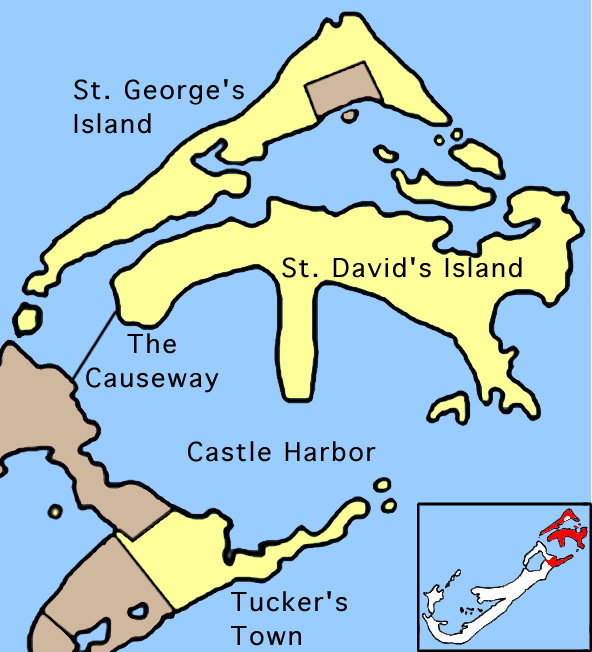
Location of the Causeway

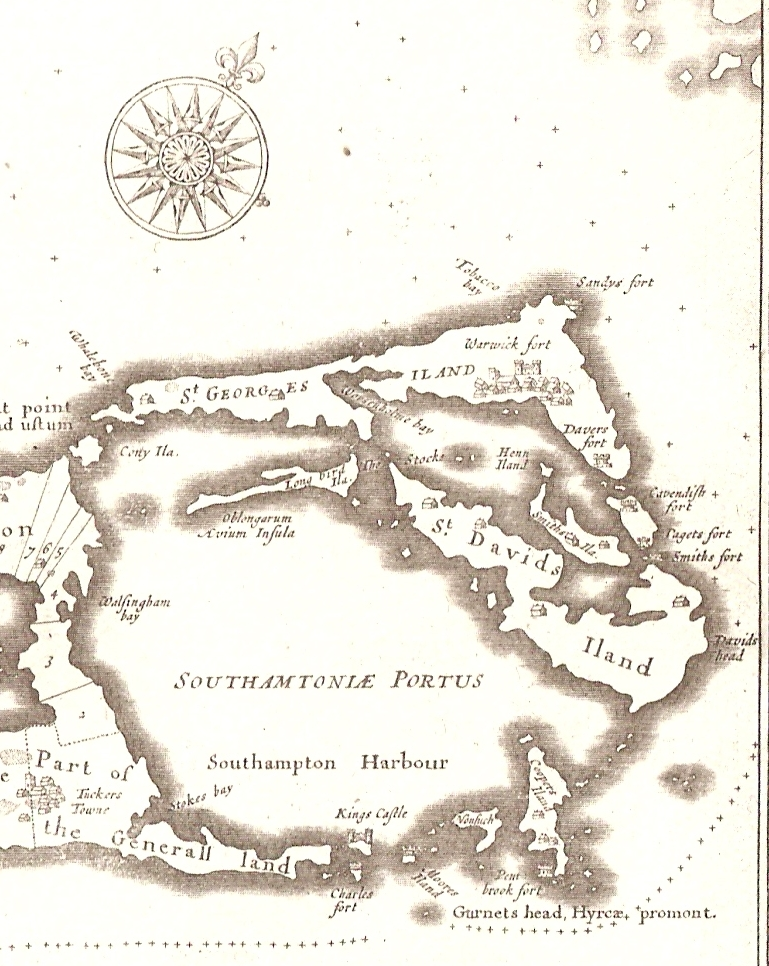
Castle Harbor in 1676

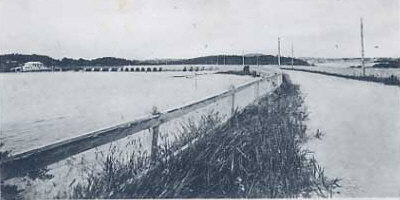
The causeway as it appeared in 1905

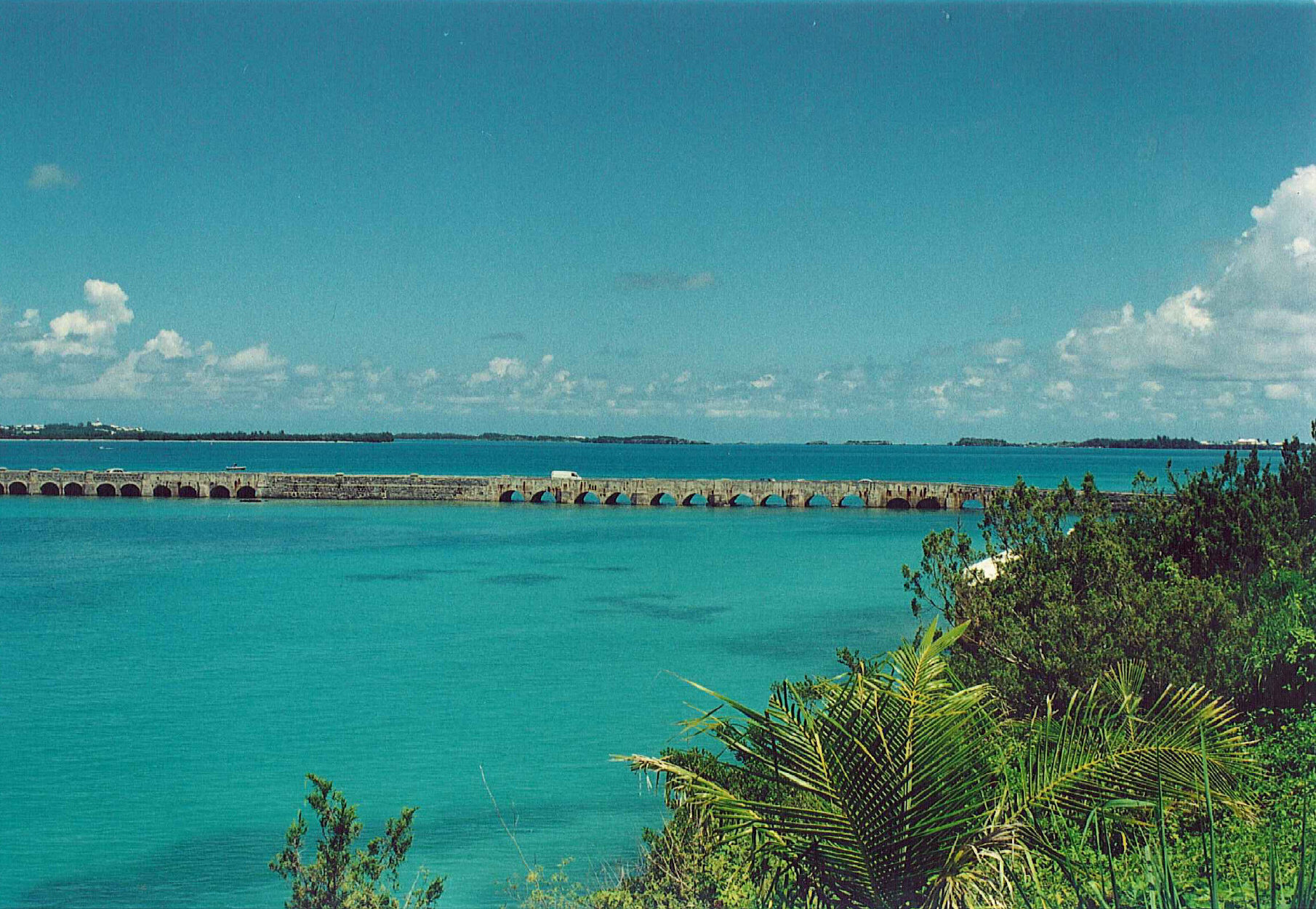
The causeway in 2006

The Causeway is a narrow strip of reclaimed land and bridges in the north of Bermuda linking Hamilton Parish on the mainland in the southwest and Bermuda International Airport on St. David's Island in St. George's Parish in the northeast, which are otherwise divided by Castle Harbour.

The need for such a roadway was long-known to Bermuda's authorities. In the early 19th century, a committee was established to investigate possible plans. It would not be until 1867 that a valid plan, that by Lt. Albert Hime of the Royal Engineers, was approved.

Built by the Royal Engineers, Hime's Causeway was opened to traffic on 19 September 1871 by Governor Lefroy. The construction project cost £27,000 (in comparison, the local government raised only £25,000 in revenue for that year). Originally, it spanned from Blue Hole Hill, across the Cartwheel Islands (four small islets that are no longer visible) to Longbird Island. The project also included a new road in Bailey's Bay and across Longbird Island, and a swing bridge from Longbird to St. George's, finally giving an uninterrupted land route from the burgeoning main island to the old colony.

Until World War II, there were virtually no motor vehicles allowed in Bermuda, and only bicycles and horse-drawn carriages used the Causeway. The Bermuda Railway operated island-wide, providing rail passenger and freight service between St. George's and Somerset in Sandys Parish, Bermuda. Consequently, the causeway was lightly used. With the construction of the Kindley Field airbase by the U.S. Army Air Force in 1942–1943 and the relaxation of the ban on motor vehicles for essential military uses during the wartime emergency, motorized vehicle use of the causeway increased significantly.

Beginning in the late 1940s after World War II, the Bermuda Government allowed civilian use of motor vehicles, and the causeway became an essential part of Bermuda's transport infrastructure for the average citizen.

Throughout its existence, the causeway has repeatedly suffered from damage due to hurricanes. On 1 September 1880, the causeway was wrecked by "the great storm". It was rebuilt following the original design, which stood until 14 September 1899, when three-fourths of a mile of the bridge was ravaged by another powerful hurricane. Afterwards, the causeway was rebuilt of stone block. Nearly a century later, in 1995, Hurricane Felix caused notable damage. On 5 September 2003, Hurricane Fabian dealt critical damage, including the loss of four lives.

Following the damage inflicted by Hurricane Fabian, the Bermuda Government began investigating alternatives to repairing the causeway after each storm knocked it out. These alternatives include an underwater tunnel, a true bridge, and constructing additional roadways, such as through Coney Island and Ferry Reach parks. Public meetings on these plans began in October 2006.

By February 2010, however, plans to replace the causeway had been abandoned. The issue was a touchy subject when raised in the Senate of Bermuda.
