= Castle Harbour, Bermuda =

Natural harbour in Bermuda

Coordinates: 32°20′50″N 64°41′14″W

Castle Harbour is a large natural harbour in Bermuda. It is located between the northeastern end of the main island and St. David's Island. Originally called Southampton Port, it was renamed as a result of its heavy fortification in the early decades of the Seventeenth century.

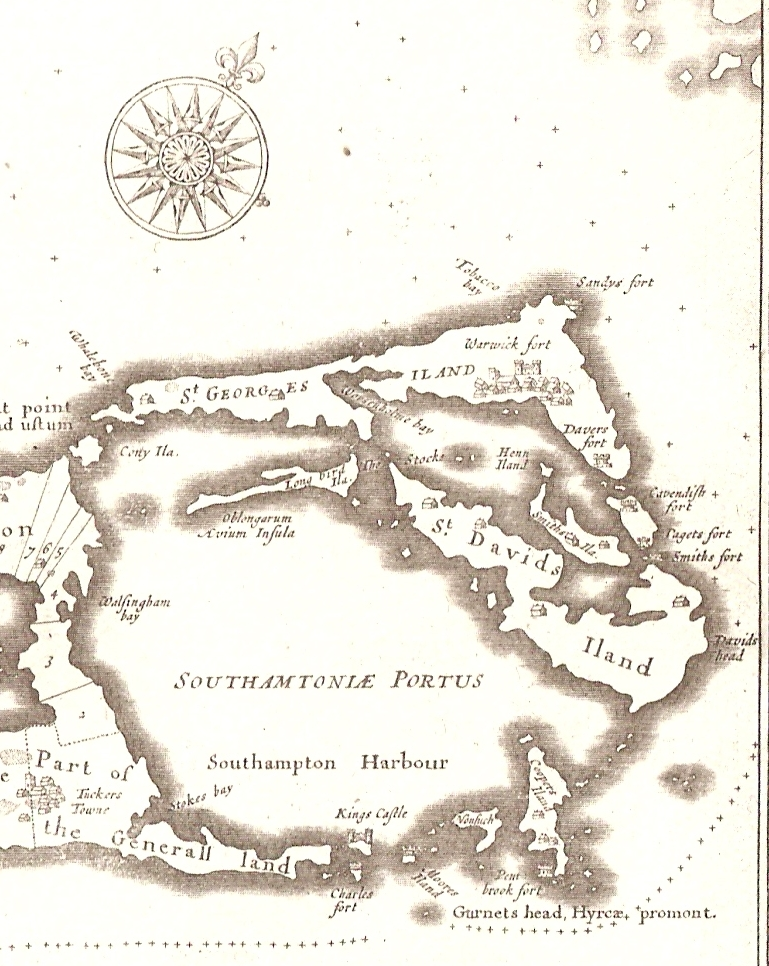
The Parish of St. George's, in 1676. Castle Island lies to the South of Castle Harbour (originally Southampton Harbour).

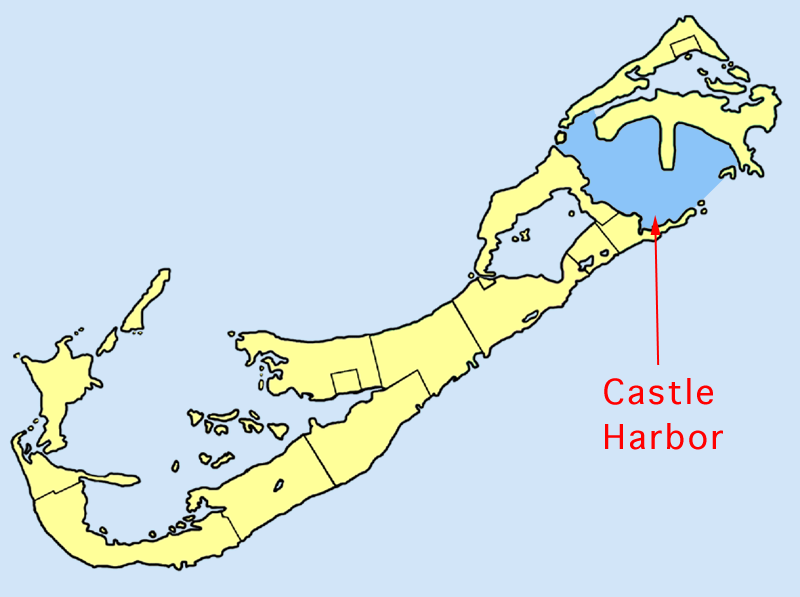
Location of Castle Harbour in Bermuda

== Geography ==
Castle Harbour is surrounded by St. George's Parish to the north, east, and south, as well as Hamilton Parish to the west. A chain of islands and rocks stretches across the main opening to the Atlantic Ocean, in the east, notably Cooper's Island (which was made a landmass contiguous to St. David's Island and Longbird Island in the 1940s), and Nonsuch Island. The only channel suitable for large vessels to enter the harbour from the open Atlantic is Castle Roads, which was historically guarded by a number of fortifications, on Castle Island, Southampton Island, and Charles Island. Forts were also placed nearby on other small islands, and on the Tucker's Town peninsula of the Main Island. In the west, The Causeway crosses from the main island to St. David's Island, and beyond this a stretch of water known as Ferry Reach connects the harbour with St. George's Harbour to the north, where Bermuda's first permanent settlement, St. George's Town, was founded in 1612. An unincorporated settlement, Tucker's Town, was established on the peninsula of the Main Island at the south-west of the harbour. The settlement was cleared by compulsory purchase order in the 1920s in order to create a luxury enclave where homes could be purchased by wealthy foreigners, and the attendant Mid Ocean Golf Club. In Hamilton Parish, on the western shore of the harbour, lies Walsingham Bay, the site where, in 1609-10, the crew of the wrecked Sea Venture built and launched the Patience, one of two ships built, which carried most of the survivors of the wrecking to Jamestown, Virginia, in 1610. The Patience returned to Bermuda with Admiral Sir George Somers, who died in Bermuda later that year.

There are many islands and beach areas in the harbour, and numerous subterranean waterways link its waters with that of Harrington Sound in the southwest, notably Crystal Cave.

== Climate ==
Climate data for Castle Harbour
Month	Jan	Feb	Mar	Apr	May	Jun	Jul	Aug	Sep	Oct	Nov	Dec	Year
Mean daily maximum °C (°F)	20 (68)	19 (66)	20 (68)	21 (69)	24 (75)	26 (78)	29 (84)	29 (84)	28 (82)	26 (78)	23 (73)	21 (69)	23 (73)
Mean daily minimum °C (°F)	15 (59)	15 (59)	15 (59)	17 (62)	19 (66)	22 (71)	24 (75)	25 (77)	24 (75)	22 (71)	19 (66)	17 (62)	19 (66)
Average precipitation mm (inches)	110 (4.4)	120 (4.6)	120 (4.7)	99 (3.9)	110 (4.5)	110 (4.4)	110 (4.2)	130 (5.3)	130 (5.2)	150 (6.1)	120 (4.9)	130 (5)	1,450 (57.1)
Source: Weatherbase

== Castle Islands ==
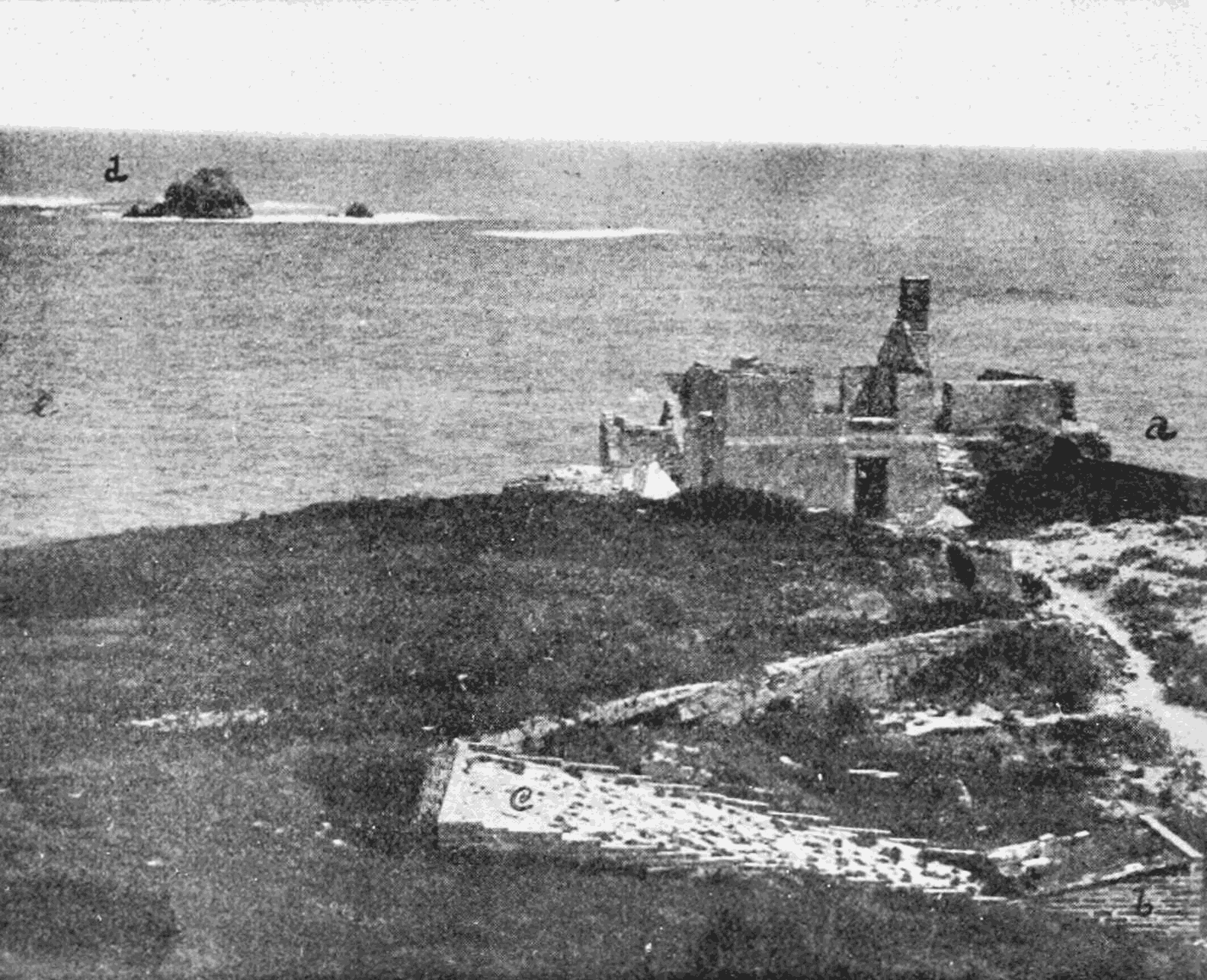
Ruined fort on Castle Island

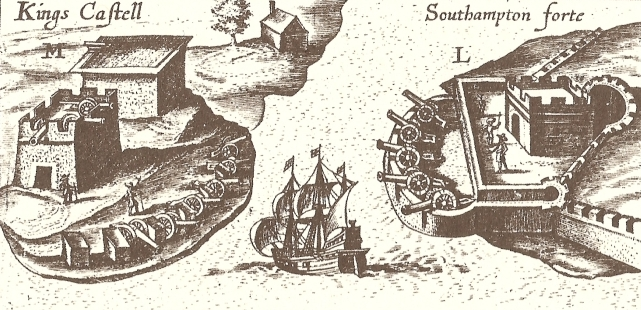
Illustration from John Smith's 1624 map of Bermuda, from The Generall Historie of Virginia, New-England, and the Summer Isles, showing Castle Roads.

Several of the islands were fortified in the early days of the territory, hence the harbour's name. When official settlement of the archipelago by England began in 1612 (unofficial settlement having begun with the 1609 wrecking of the Sea Venture) the first permanent town, St. George's (then called New London) was placed on the north side of St. George's Harbour. St. George's Harbour could be accessed directly by channels from the East. Those channels, however, were shallow, suitable, originally, only for small ships. As a consequence, and despite any major settlement on its shores, Castle Harbour was an important anchorage in the early years of the colony, with its main entrance, Castle Roads being an important route in from the open Atlantic for shipping. It was also a weak point, as it was remote from the defences of St. George's Harbour, and difficult to reach. It was quickly fortified and garrisoned by a standing militia.

Initial fortification by the Virginia Company's (Bermuda was originally settled as an extension of Virginia) first deliberate settlers in 1612, was around the inlets to St. George's Harbour, but by the end of that year work had commenced on Castle Harbour's defences, starting at Castle Island (previously called Gurnett's Head, and King's Island. As a temporary measure, two guns had been salvaged from the 1609 wreck of the Sea Venture, one of which was installed on Castle Island ) in 1612. Proper fortifications were soon raised under the instructions of Governor Richard Moore. King's Castle is, today, the oldest surviving English fortification in the New World. It is Bermuda's oldest standing stone building, predating the State House. Its Captain's House, built a year after the State House, in 1621, is the oldest stone home in Bermuda. It is also the oldest standing English house in the New World. In 1614, King's Castle famously repulsed Spain's only ever attack on Bermuda. Two shots were fired from its artillery. Although neither struck, the Spanish vessel abandoned the attack (its crew did not realise that the gunners in the fort had only enough ammunition for one more shot). This fort was used as late as the Second World War by Bermuda's military garrison, with soldiers living in tents within its walls, watching over the channels with machine guns. Other forts built at the south of Castle Harbour included Devonshire Redoubt (1620) and the Landward Fort, on Castle Island, Southampton Fort (1620), on Southampton Island (originally known as Moore's Island and Brangman's Island), at the east side of Castle Roads, Old Castle, or Charles' Fort, (1615), on Goat Island, Pembroke Fort, on Cooper's Island, and Fort Bruere, on the Main Island.

== Other fortifications on Castle Harbour ==
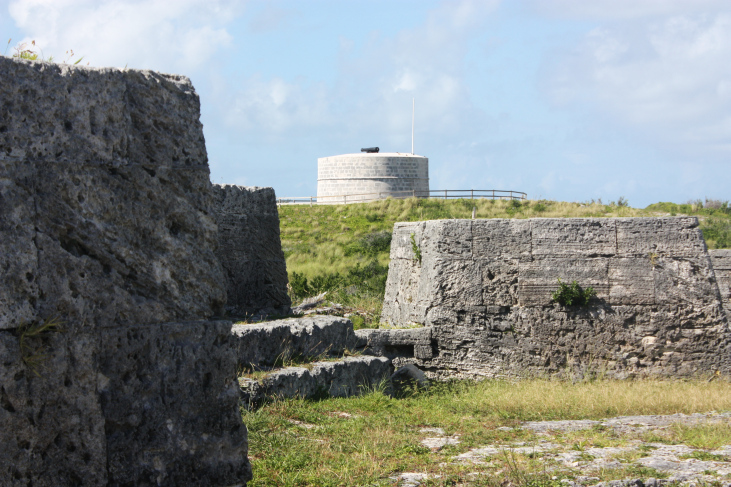
Martello Tower seen from Ferry Island Fort, Ferry Reach, Bermuda 2011

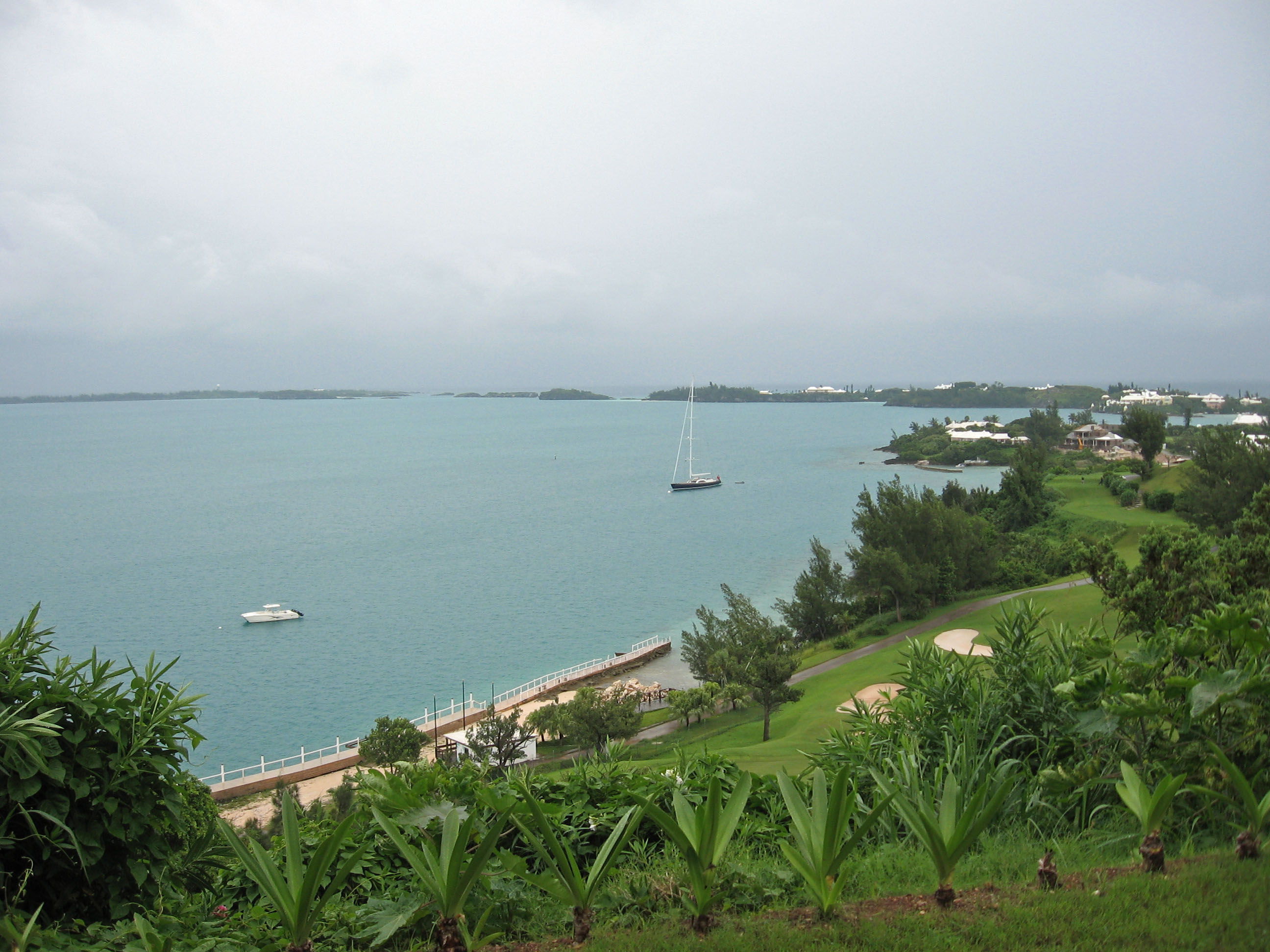
Castle Harbour from Tucker's Town

At Ferry Reach, on the north of Castle Harbour (an area now separated by the Causeway), Burnt Point Fort, or Ferry Point Battery (1688), and Ferry Island Fort (1790s) were built, and, much later, in 1822, a Martello Tower. The island chain across the south of Castle Harbour is often referred to as the Castle Islands. Their fortifications are the oldest surviving English New World fortifications (due primarily to their having been constructed of stone, whereas contemporary English fortifications on the North American continent were built from timber and earth). They were also the first English coastal fortifications in the New World. As a result of their historical significance, they have been made a UNESCO World Heritage Site, together with St. George's Town.

Castle Harbour is the only breeding ground in the world of the famous rare seabird, the Bermuda petrel or cahow.

The north of the harbour was altered considerably during the Second World War, when the US Army built a large airbase, Kindley Field, which is today the Bermuda International Airport. This involved the levelling of Longbird Island, and several smaller islets, and infilling waterways and much of the harbour to create a land mass contiguous with St. David's Island and Cooper's Island.
