= Cooper's Island, Bermuda =

Island of Bermuda

Coordinates: 32.3528°N 64.6592°W

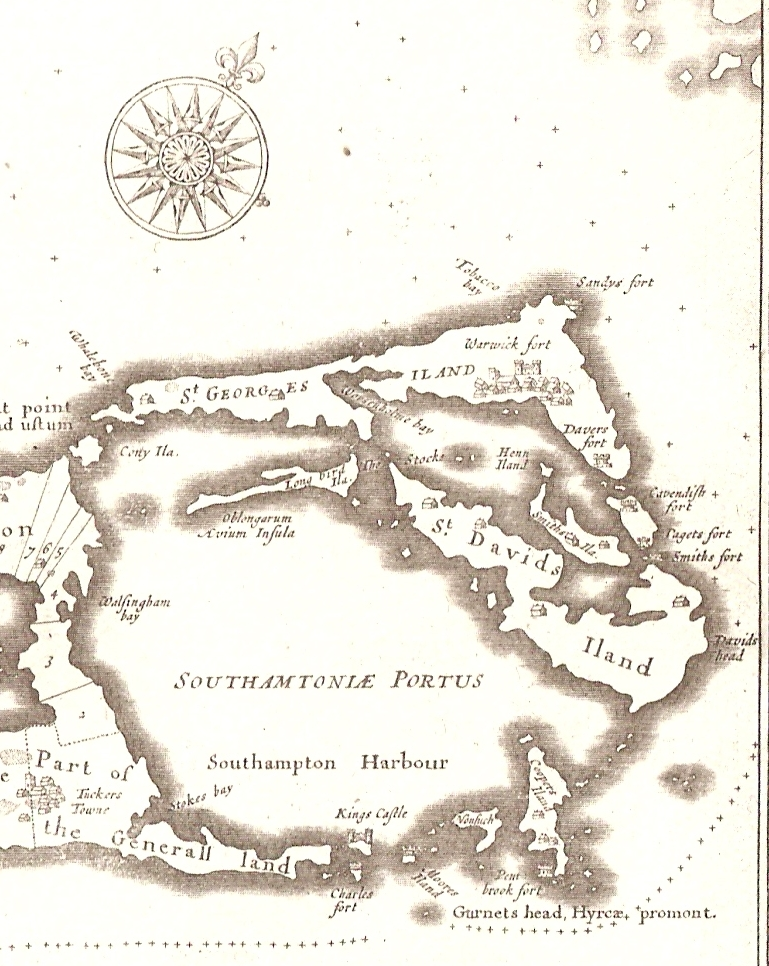
Map of Castle Harbor (originally Southampton Harbour) in 1676, showing Cooper's Island to the south of St. David's Island

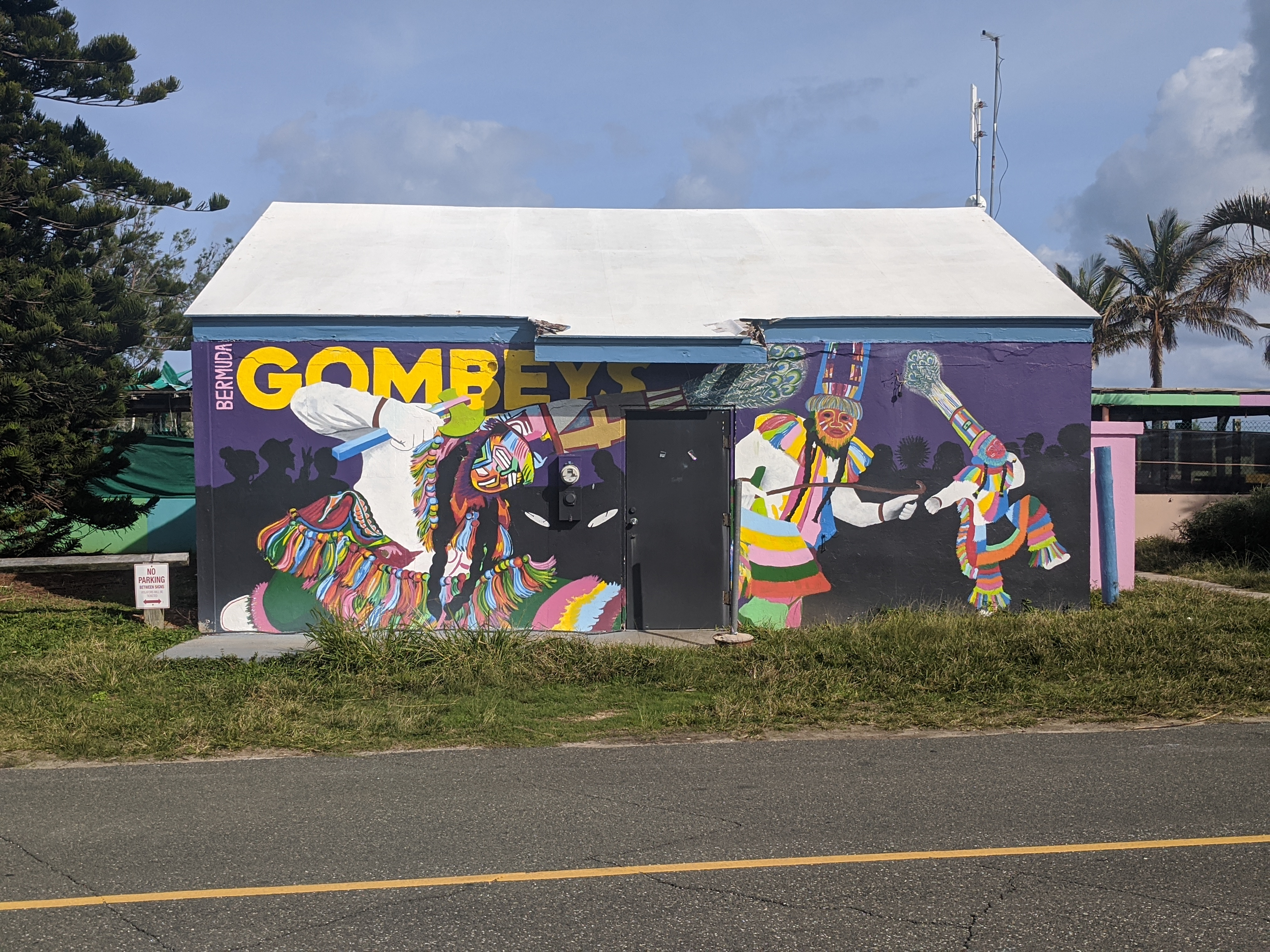
Cooper's Island

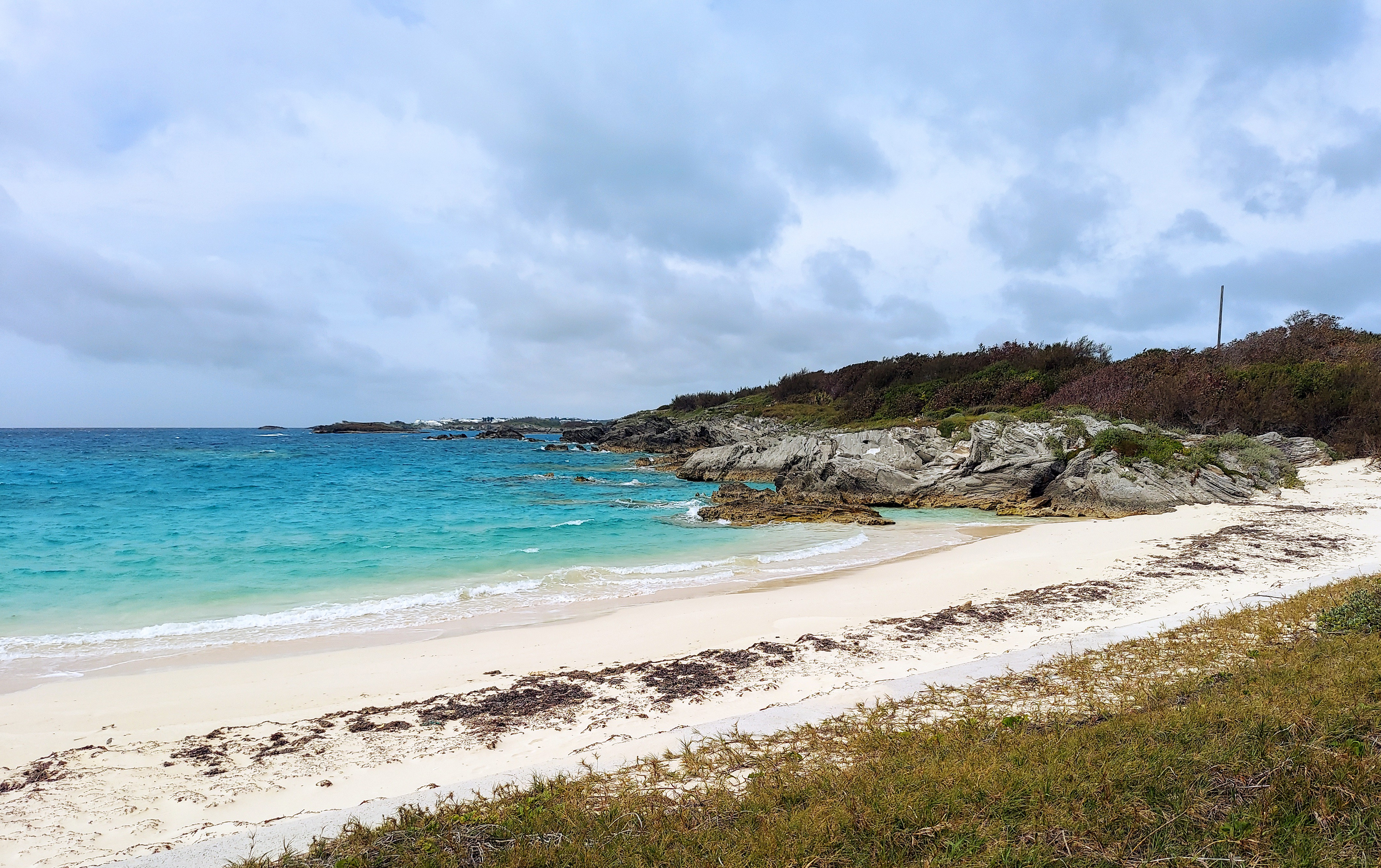
Cooper's Island Nature Reserve

Cooper's Island is part of the chain which makes up Bermuda. It is located in St. George's Parish, in the northeast of the territory.

The 77-acre (31 hectare) island is located in the northeast of Castle Harbor. Due to reclamation work, it is now joined physically to St. David's Island as a southeastern peninsula. For most purposes, it is still considered as though it were a separate island. Its most notable feature is the expanse of Annie's Bay, which stretches along much of the island's east coast.

The island has been used by many United States government agencies, having been leased to the US Army, US Air Force and US Navy from 1942, during World War II, to 1995. It also is home to a NASA space tracking station, recently renovated in 2018. Until 1995, access was restricted, but it is now open to the public.

Most of Cooper's Island is owned by the Bermudian government. It is preserved as the Cooper's Island Nature Reserve, which has been under active restoration since 2009. Swimming, walking, picnicking, bird watching and snorkelling are all permitted within the reserve.

== Important Bird Area ==
With the adjacent Castle Islands Nature Reserve, Cooper's Island has been identified as an Important Bird Area by BirdLife International, principally because of its importance as a breeding site for seabirds.
