= St. David's Island, Bermuda =

One of the principal islands of Bermuda

Coordinates: 32°22′03″N 64°40′47″W

St. David's Island
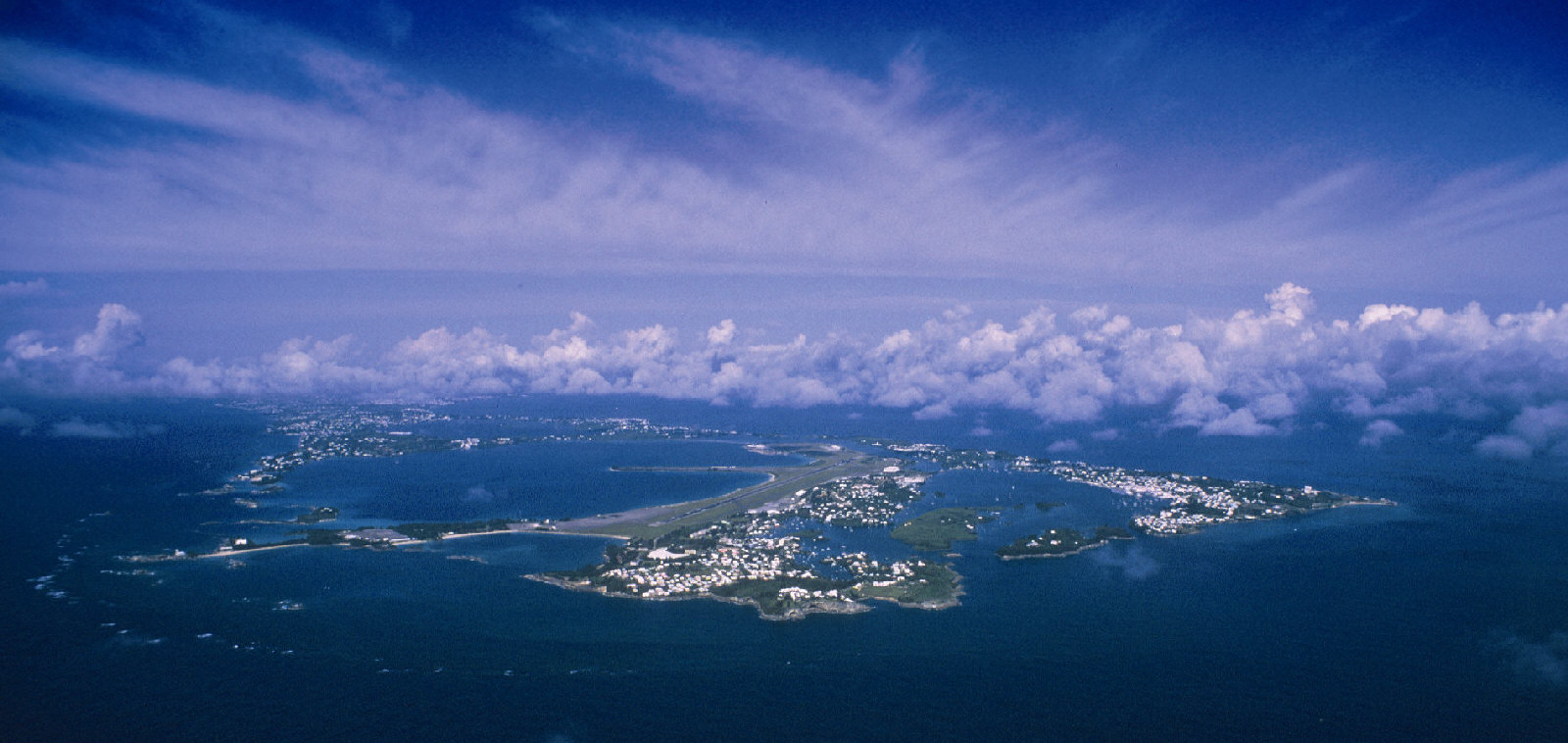
- Aerial view of Bermuda, with St. David's Island in the foreground.

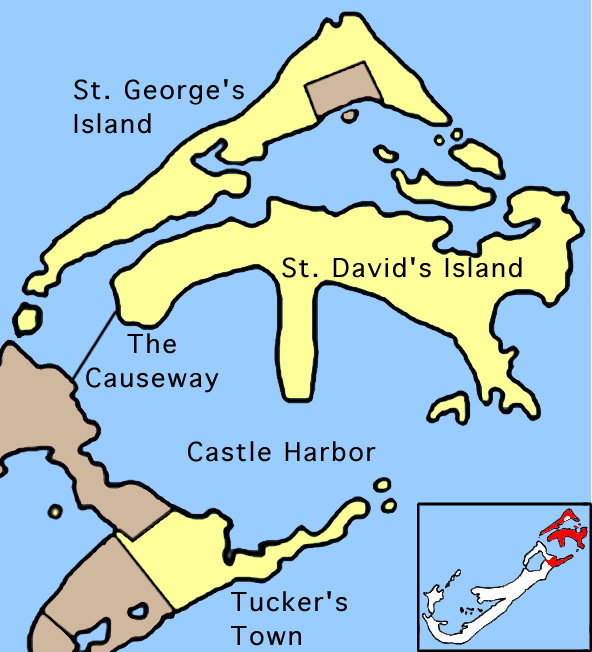
- St. George's and St. David's Islands

- Location within Bermuda

Geography
- Location: North Atlantic Ocean

Administration
- Bermuda
- Parish: St. George's Parish

St. David's Island is one of the main islands of the British Overseas Territory of Bermuda. It is located in the far north of the territory, one of the two similarly sized islands that make up the majority of St. George's Parish.

The island was originally 503 acres (2.04 square kilometres) in size. During World War II, in 1942 it was enlarged by reclamation, and by absorbing Long Bird Island and Cooper's Island, to 650 acres (2.63 square kilometres), in order to allow room for a United States military base (originally the US Army's Fort Bell/Kindley Field, operated jointly during the war with the British Royal Air Force). This was later renamed as Kindley Air Force Base and USNAS Bermuda, which occupied more than half the island's land under a 99-year lease.

The base was closed in 1995 and returned to Bermuda. Those parts of the base required for operation of the airfield, along with the Civil Air Terminal, became the Bermuda International Airport (subsequently renamed L.F. Wade International Airport by the PLP government). Cooper's Island is now attached physically to southeast St. David's, although the two islands are still widely regarded as if they were separate entities.

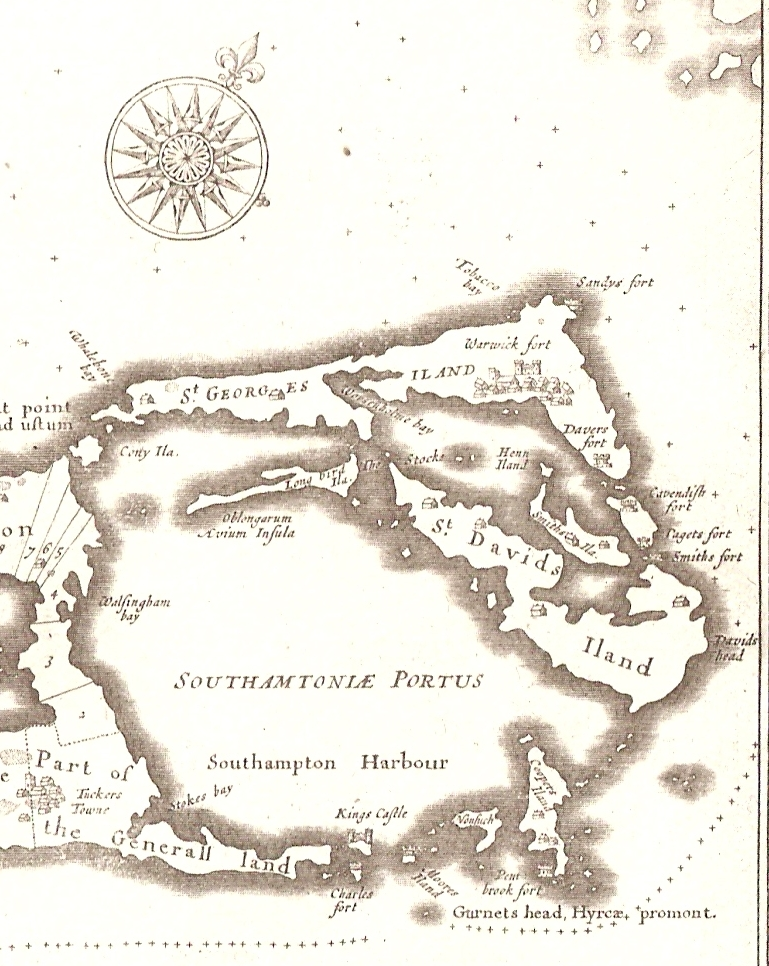
St. David's, in 1676. The shape of St. David's Island, and of Castle Harbour (originally Southampton Harbour), was radically altered by the construction of an airfield in 1941, Kindley Field, by the US Army.

The island was named by British colonists in honour of Saint David, the patron saint of Wales, as the similarly sized St. George's Island, to the north, had been named for the patron saint of England. The two islands are separated by two bodies of water – Ferry Reach in the southwest and St. George's Harbor in the northeast. St. David's is separated from the Bermudian mainland by the waters of Castle Harbor in the south, but is joined to it by road via The Causeway.

Notable features of the island include St. David's Head, Bermuda's easternmost point, and the nearby St. David's Battery, on Great Head (Great Head is the more prominent of two headlands that comprise St. David's Head). L.F. Wade International Airport; St. David's Lighthouse; and Annie's Bay on Cooper's Island.

St. David's Island is connected to the United States by an Atlantic fiber optic cable known as 360 Americas.

== Demographics ==
Like other Bermudians, the St. David's islanders were established from a diverse group of immigrants beginning in the 17th century, creating a distinct St. David's culture. These included indentured servants from England, Ireland, and Scotland and enslaved people who were Spanish-speaking Blacks from the West Indies, Black Africans, and Native Americans.

Elizabeth Jones wrote: "Many islanders of Native American descent grew up thinking they were Mohawk. Indeed, the word ‘Mohawk’ was often used as an insult...."

Enslaved Native Americans arrived in Bermuda after the Pequot War and King Philip's War, many being sent to St. David's Island. Since the 1990s, the Bermudian Native community has been reconnecting with New England tribes.

== Education ==
St. David's Preschool and Primary School are both on the island.

Clearwater Middle School is also located on St. David's. It opened on September 6, 1997 in the former Roger B. Chaffee High School with 155 students, formerly from the St. George's Secondary School.
