= Scaur Hill Fort, Bermuda =

Fortified position on Bermuda

Scaur Hill Fort
- Scaur Hill, Somerset Island, Sandys Parish, Bermuda
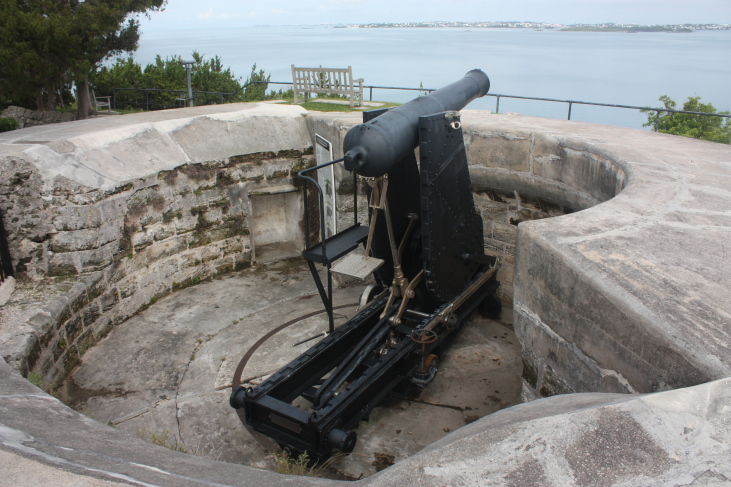
- A 64 Pounder Rifled Muzzle-Loader (RML) gun on Moncrieff disappearing mount, at Scaur Hill Fort

Site information
- Type: Fort
- Owner: War Office (original); Parks Department of the local Government of Bermuda (current)
- Operator: British ArmyUnited States Army
- Open to the public: Yes
- Condition: Under ongoing restoration

Location
- Location of St. David's Battery in Bermuda
- Coordinates: 32.285168°N 64.872304°W

Site history
- Built: 1870s
- In use: 1870s - 1957
- Materials: Stone

Garrison information
- Garrison: Bermuda Garrison Western District
- Occupants: Royal Artillery, Royal Engineers, United States Army Coast Artillery Corps

Scaur Hill Fort, also called Scaur Hill Lines and Somerset Lines, is a fortified position erected in the 1870s at Scaur Hill, on Somerset Island, in Sandys Parish, the westernmost parish of the Imperial fortress colony of Bermuda.

== History ==
Somerset Island lies between the Main Island and the old Admiralty and War Department lands on Watford Island, Boaz Island, and Ireland Island. Boaz and Watford Islands from the 1860s housed the headquarters, main barracks, station hospital, and other facilities of the Western District of the garrison of Bermuda (the Command Headquarters was at Prospect Camp in the Central District, and the Eastern District was controlled from the old headquarters at St. George's Garrison). Ireland Island housed the Royal Naval Dockyard and main base of the North America and West Indies Station of the Royal Navy. The overlarge naval and military establishment at Bermuda in the Nineteenth Century and the first half of the Twentieth Century was due to the colony's role as an Imperial fortress, the lynchpin of Britain's supremacy in the western Atlantic Ocean and (after the completion of the Panama Canal and the establishment of alliance, amity, and common interests with the United States of America from the First World War, onwards) the Eastern Pacific Ocean, and upon the coast of America (as had been demonstrated during the American War of 1812, when the blockade of the Atlantic seaboard of the United States by the squadron of the then-North America Station of the Royal Navy had been orchestrated from Bermuda, with military forces from Bermuda working with the squadron in a succession of amphibious operations, including the Battle of Craney Island, culminating in the 1814 Chesapeake campaign that included Battle of Bladensburg, capturing and burning Washington, DC, and raiding Alexandria, Virginia),

As Britain could afford neither to lose the use of Bermuda as a base for British forces, nor to allow it to fall into the hands of an enemy that would make similar use of it against Britain, vast sums were invested during the Nineteenth Century on its defence, which had previously been left from 1612 to 1701 to the non-professional military forces (militia and volunteers), with the addition of a small force of regular infantry from 1701 'til the Napoleonic Wars (excepting several years between the Seven Years' War and the American War of Independence during which there were no regular soldiers). During the Nineteenth Century the regular Board of Ordnance and British Army establishment in Bermuda grew large.

The large number of fortified coastal artillery batteries that the amateur gunners had erected primarily along the north-eastern sends of St. George's Island, Paget Island, Governor's Island, and St. David's Island, the fortifications at Castle Harbour, along the South Shore of the Main Island, and the western coasts of the Main Island, Somerset Island, Daniel's Island, and Ireland Island, were re-built and re-armed with more modern weapons, or (particularly in the case of the South Shore batteries on the Main Island) or stripped of their fixed armament and converted into prepared gun positions to which mobile artillery pieces could be deployed as required from Prospect Camp via the military road built along the South shore in the 1860s. The only shipping channel by which any of Bermuda's harbours could be reached through the encompassing barrier reef by large vessels ran close to shore at the East End, rounding St. David's and St. George's Island to give access to the northern lagoon (where Murray's Anchorage, the old anchorage used by the Royal Navy from the 1790s while the naval base was at St. George's Town pending the construction of the dockyard, was located off St. George's Island), the Great Sound (a large, nearly enclosed body of water, including the main naval anchorage at Grassy Bay, with its main opening at the North to the Northern lagoon, and minor entries between Ireland and Boaz Islands, between Boaz and Watford Islands until the Army built an isthmus to link them, between Watford and Somerset Islands, and between Somerset and Main Islands via Ely's Harbour and a narrow channel over which Somerset Bridge, Bermuda was constructed.

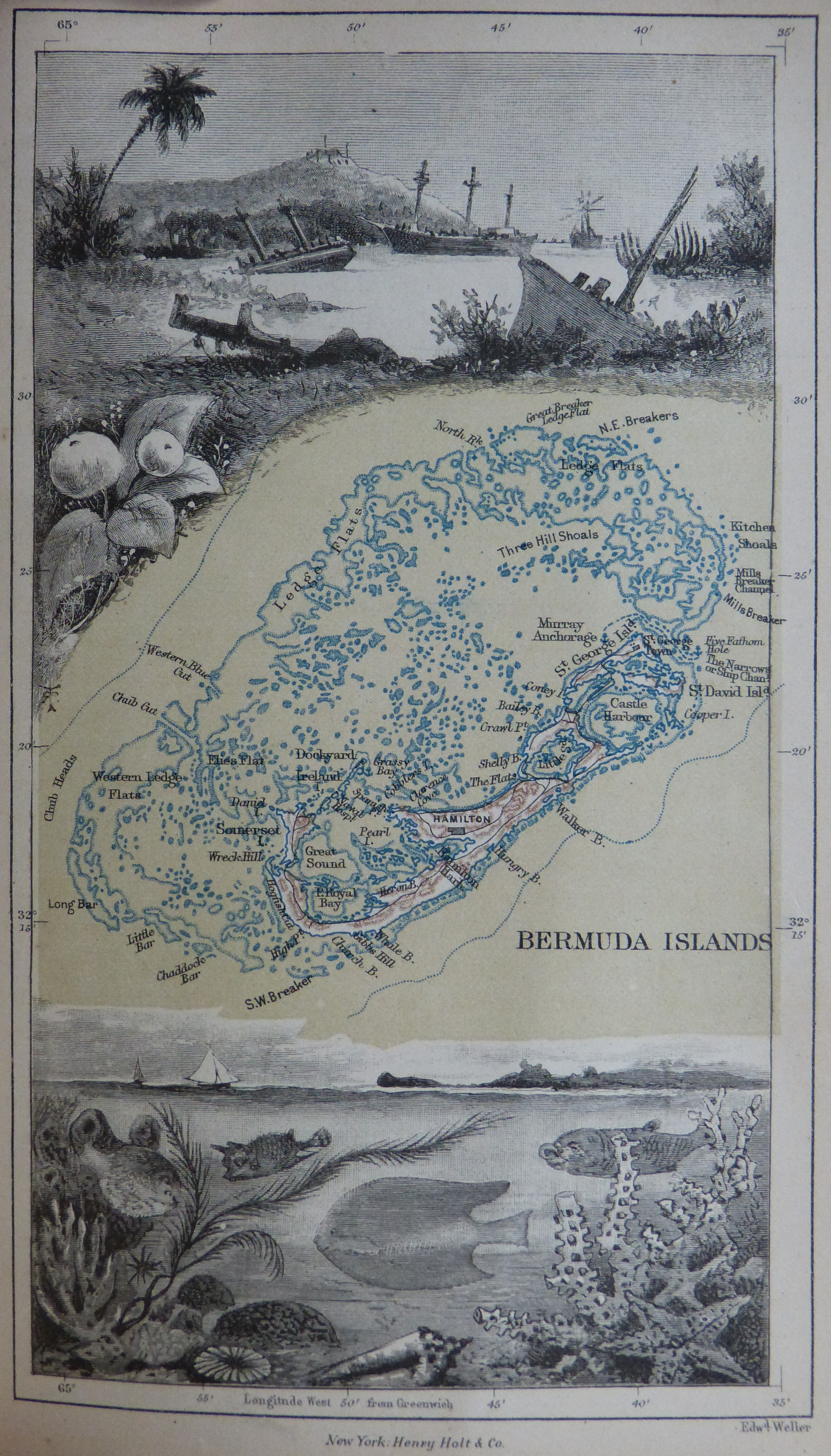
1885 Map of Bermuda and its reefs, showing the Hogfish Cut (channel)

Due to the location of the main channel through the reefs being at the East End, the bulk of the fortifications and fixed coastal batteries from the Nineteenth Century were located there, armed with large, high-velocity guns capable of reaching and sinking large vessels off shore or entering or navigating the channel. Three large forts (Fort Prospect, Fort Langton, and Fort Hamilton), known collectively as the Prospect Hill Position, were built in Prospect Camp to prevent any enemy force that succeeded in landing on the Main Island from advancing field guns to Spanish Point on the eastern side of the mouth of the Great Sound, from where they might fire upon the Royal Naval Dockyard or naval vessels anchored at Grassy Bay. The small batteries along the South Shore had been generally been armed with small calibre fixed guns by the volunteer artillery as they were expected to be employed against small boats attempting to carry landing parties over the reefline to the South Shore beaches. The regular Royal Artillery anticipated the same employment, which could be met more economically in both material and manpower terms by a handful of field guns kept at Prospect Camp and drawn wherever required by horse team.

At the West End, however, were two minor channels used mainly by fishing boats and small ocean-going vessels. The Battle of Wreck Hill had taken place here during the American War of Independence, when entry via the Hogfish Cut was attempted by two rebel sloops under the command of a pair of Bermudian brothers who had settled in South Carolina, but were familiar with Bermuda's reefs and channels. The Wreck Hill Fort atop the eponymous hill that stands on the Peninsula of Flemish Wreck (which partly encloses the western side of Ely's Harbour) succeeded in halting their progress, but these small batteries were only fortified against fire from offshore vessels and were vulnerable at the rear to landing parties. The rebel sloops landed men to act as infantry who attacked the fort from behind, forcing the gunners to abandon it, then spiked its guns before retreating themselves.

As the advent of the torpedo boat meant a fast attacking force of small vessels capable of wreaking havoc on the naval squadron anchored at Grassy Bay could enter the Great Sound by this way, fixed batteries were maintained in the West End forts, though generally with smaller guns than at the East End suitable for use against small, unarmoured, but fast-moving, vessels at close range.

Another threat to the naval base came from any military force that might succeed on crossing over the reefline and landing on the South Shore, which might then advance over land to the West End.

For this reason, a defensible dry moat was cut across Somerset Island, through Scaur Hill, from Ely's Harbour to the Great Sound. This line would be defended with small arms by infantry behind the ramparts, but artillery support was provided by two 64 Pounder Rifled Muzzle-Loader (RML) gun on Moncrieff disappearing mounts. One of these was placed in a small keep at the salient, facing south-eastward, the mount gave it 360-degrees of traverse. The other was in an emplacement to the west of this, facing south-westward. The guns had a range of 4,000 yards, capable of firing not only on infantry advancing from the Main Island, but also on vessels navigating the western channel or the Great Sound. The keep containing the eastern gun emplacement is polygonal, of the Prussian style, with a defensive wall and dry moat to the rear defended by a block house. The western emplacement is open to the rear. As with most of the forts and batteries built in Bermuda with earthwork to obscure and protect them, it is nearly invisible from the water. A water catchment and tanks were built to the north of the polygonal fort. With the new fort on Scaur Hill, the Wreck Hill Fort, which it overlooks, was excess to need and abandoned.

With its muzzle loading guns obsolete, the fort was used during the First World War only as a site to which field guns or howitzers could be deployed when required, and as a training area for infantry. As part of the extensive cutbacks made to the British Army in the period of Government austerity that followed the First World War, the Bermuda Garrison was run down in stages. The regular infantry, which had numbered between one and three battalions since the start of the Nineteenth Century, was reduced to a single battalion, then a wing, then a company, and finally a detachment. The companies of the Royal Artillery and Royal Engineers were removed in 1928, leaving only a handful of regulars assigned to the Command Staff or the Permanent Staff of the part-time units. Responsibility for maintaining the defences in a ready-for-war condition was placed fully upon the part-time units, requiring their re-organisation (the Bermuda Volunteer Rifle Corps re-organised from a volunteer to a territorial unit in 1921. The Bermuda Militia Artillery (one of the last remaining British militia artillery units at the time) was too small to man all of the batteries still in use at that point, and consequently only the two 6 inch guns at St. David's Battery were kept ready-for-war. Although the District Establishment of the Royal Artillery maintained guns in a handful of other batteries, and the General Officer Commanding-in-Chief Bermuda (who was also the civil Governor) at the start of the Second World War requested the addition of more 9.2 guns to the defences (together with re-activating the three already in place at St. David's Battery and Fort Victoria), the British Government could not spare funds on improving the colony's defences, or on building an airfield sorely need for tans-Atlantic flight (there being two air stations at Bermuda at the start of the war, RAF Darrell's Island and Royal Naval Air Station Bermuda on Boaz Island, but both only for use by flying boats). Instead, free ninety-nine year base rights were granted to the United States, which began building both the United States Naval Operating Base, Bermuda (in the Great Sound, immediately southward of Scaur Hill Fort) and the United States Army's Kindley Field on Castle Harbour while the United States still neutral. These base leases were appended to the Destroyers-for-bases deal but Britain received no war material in exchange. Kindley Field, however, was to be used jointly by Britain, with both the Fleet Air Arm and the Royal Air Force moving some of their operations there, utilising landplanes, when the airfield became operable in 1943. The United States forces also took responsibility for anti-submarine air patrols around Bermuda, and the United States Army's Bermuda Base Command and the United States Marine Corps units deployed to protect the American naval base made increasing the British Army's garrison unnecessary. The only new coastal artillery battery built during the war was the Warwick Camp Battery of two 6 inch guns, built in 1939 on a hilltop on the Southampton side of the Warwick-Southampton parish boundary (replacing a handful of older coastal batteries within the boundaries of Warwick Camp).

The United States Army Coast Artillery Corps emplaced a large number of railway and fixed coastal artillery guns about Bermuda, most on or beside the locations of older British or British colonial batteries, such as at Coopers's Island, Fort Victoria, and Fort Langton. The US Army placed two 8 inch railway guns at Scaur Hill, immediately to the north of the fort's water catchment. The United States Army also built a network of Base End Observation Posts (roughly a dozen identical towers on hilltops about Bermuda) to co-ordinate the fire of all of the British as well as American guns.

The United States Army Coast Artillery Corps and all of the American army or marine infantry not required for the sole defence of the American bases was withdrawn from Bermuda. The British Army would maintain St. David's Battery until 1953, a few years before the British Army de-activated all of its remaining coastal artillery.

During the Second World War, the Allies had divided control of the Atlantic between the Royal Navy in the east and the United States Navy in the west, subordinating the Royal Navy's America and West Indies Station to the United States Naval command. Although the Royal Navy restored the Commander-in-Chief of the station after the war, with the formation of the North Atlantic Treaty Organization in 1949, the control of the western Atlantic remained with the United States Navy. With the British Government also keen to reduce its expenditure in light of its war deb and the British Empire rapidly shrinking, the Royal Naval Dockyard in Bermuda was reduced to a base in 1951 (which finally closed in 1995), with the ships based there required to cross the Atlantic to Britain for refit or repair. The Commander-in-Chief America and West Indies was abolished in 1956. With the run-down of the naval establishment in Bermuda, the last regular army units in Bermuda (including the staff of the Command Headquarters, a company of infantry detached from the battalion at Jamaica, and various detachments and attachments from supporting corps) were withdrawn in 1953, though a detachment of infantry was returned to Prospect Camp within weeks due to the pending Three-Powers Conference hosted in Bermuda by Prime Minister Sir Winston Churchill, (the other participants being US President Dwight David Eisenhower and French Prime Minister Joseph Laniel), which was delayed for months before taking place in December, 1953. During the conference, Churchill was convinced to permanently restore the Bermuda Garrison, but the impending end of National Service and substantial reductions to the regular army resulted in the closure of the garrison in 1957, with all regular units withdrawn. All remaining Admiralty and War Department land in Bermuda was transferred to the colonial government in 1958.

== Today ==
The local Government of Bermuda maintains the fortifications and surrounding natural space at Scaur Hill as a public park. Parts of the disappearing gunmounts remained at the fort, though the guns had been removed. Numerous guns of various types and vintages littered Bermuda, however, and the eastern emplacement is now occupied by a reproduction mount containing the original counterweight, fitted with an original gun, and parts for a second await assembly (in 2019) at the western emplacement.
