= List of islands of Bermuda =

Bermuda
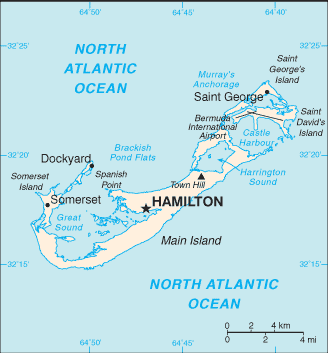
- A map of the Bermuda Islands

Administration
- United Kingdom

Bermuda is an archipelago consisting of 181 islands.

== List of islands ==
Name	Image	Coordinates	Parish	Note
Agar's Island		32°17′38″N 64°48′33″W	Pembroke	In Great Sound. Was owned by billionaire James Martin, and was historically a secret munitions store, part of the Bermuda Garrison of the British Army.
Alpha Island		32°17′04″N 64°49′55″W	Warwick	In Great Sound. Also known as Diving Board Island as it is a popular spot for cliff jumping.
Banjo Island		32°22′33″N 64°41′36″W	St. George's	In Mullet Bay, St. George's Island. Also known as Bartram Island.
Bartlett's Islands		32°15′25″N 64°50′14″W	Southampton	In Little Sound. Two islands connected by a natural causeway.
Bay Island		32°21′02″N 64°43′32″W	Hamilton	In Bailey's Bay.
Bermuda Island (Main Island)		32°18′00″N 64°46′00″W	Several parishes	Central Bermuda, in main chain. Largest of the Bermuda Islands.
Beta Island		32°16′55″N 64°49′40″W	Warwick	In Great Sound.
Bethell's Island		32°18′07″N 64°52′46″W	Sandys	At the entrance to Ely's Harbour.
Bird Island		32°17′47″N 64°48′32″W	Pembroke	In Great Sound.
Bird Rock		32°20′15″N 64°40′12″W	St. George's	In mouth of Castle Harbour.
Bluck's Island		32°17′10″N 64°48′35″W	Warwick	In Great Sound. Formerly Dyer('s) Island, Denslow('s) Island.
Boaz Island		32°18′22″N 64°51′23″W	Sandys	Northwest Bermuda, in main chain. Formerly known as Gate's Island or Yates Island.
Brangman's Fort		32°20′32″N 64°40′03″W	St. George's	In mouth of Castle Harbour.
Brooks Island		32°22′18″N 64°40′30″W	St. George's	In St. George's Harbour.
Buck Island		32°15′26″N 64°51′32″W	Southampton	In Little Sound.
Burnt Island		32°17′03″N 64°47′44″W	Paget	In Hamilton Harbour.
Burt Island, Warwick		32°16′32″N 64°49′32″W	Warwick	In Great Sound.
Burt's Island, Saint George's		32°22′14″N 64°40′18″W	St. George's	In St. George's Harbour.
Castle Island		32°20′27″N 64°40′20″W	St. George's	In mouth of Castle Harbour.
Cat Island			Pembroke	In Great Sound.
Cave Island		32°21′50″N 64°41′17″W	St. George's	Now incorporated into Saint David's Island.
Charles Island		32°20′19″N 64°40′16″W	St. George's	In mouth of Castle Harbour.
Cobbler's Island		32°18′30″N 64°49′08″W	Pembroke	At the entrance to Great Sound.
Coney Island		32°21′30″N 64°42′55″W	St. George's	Off the northern tip of the main island.
Cooper Island		32°21′10″N 64°40′30″W	St. George's	Now incorporated into Saint David's Island. Also known as Cooper's Island.
Crawl Island		32°18′43″N 64°50′42″W	Sandys	Off the coast of Ireland Island.
Cross Island		32°19′31″N 64°50′09″W	Sandys	Part of the Royal Naval Dockyard. Now connected to Ireland Island and largely reclaimed.
Crow Island		32°20′02″N 64°43′31″W	Hamilton	In Harrington Sound. Also known as Easmos' Island.
Current Island		32°18′22″N 64°51′28″W	Sandys	Off the coast of Watford Island.
Daniel's Island		32°18′20″N 64°52′57″W	Sandys	Off the west coast of Somerset Island.
Darrell's Island		32°16′30″N 64°49′15″W	Warwick	In Great Sound.
Delta Island		32°16′51″N 64°49′27″W	Warwick	In Great Sound.
Doctor's Island		32°17′08″N 64°47′50″W	Paget	In Hamilton Harbour.
Epsilon Island		32°16′52″N 64°49′21″W	Warwick	In Great Sound.
Eta Island		32°17′05″N 64°49′06″W	Warwick	In Great Sound.
Fern Island		32°17′01″N 64°48′58″W	Warwick	In Great Sound.
Ferry Island		32°21′43″N 64°42′50″W	St. George's	Off the southern tip of St. George's Island.
Five Star Island		32°15′22″N 64°50′37″W	Southampton	In Little Sound.
Gamma Island		32°16′53″N 64°49′35″W	Warwick	In Great Sound.
Gibbet Island		32°19′23″N 64°44′37″W	Smith's	At the mouth of Flatt's Inlet. Also known as Gallows Island. Connected to the main island at low tide by a natural causeway.
Goat Island, Pembroke		32°17′47″N 64°48′25″W	Pembroke	In Great Sound.
Goat Island, Saint George's		32°21′18″N 64°39′48″W	St. George's	In Castle Harbour.
Godet Island, Paget		32°16′47″N 64°48′04″W	Paget	In Great Sound. Not to be confused with the larger nearby Hinson's Island, formerly known as Godet's Island.
Goose Island		32°17′51″N 64°48′34″W	Pembroke	In Great Sound.
Governor's Island		32°22′19″N 64°39′28″W	St. George's	At the entrance to St. George's Harbour.
Grace Island		32°16′25″N 64°50′05″W	Warwick	In Great Sound.
Grasbury's Island		32°21′18″N 64°39′22″W	St. George's	Off east coast of Saint David's Island.
Great Oswego Island		32°22′01″N 64°39′41″W	St. George's	In Smith's Sound.
Green Rock		32°20′40″N 64°39′40″W	St. George's	In mouth of Castle Harbour.
Grey's Island		32°18′47″N 64°51′02″W	Sandys	Off the northern tip of Boaz Island.
Haggis Island		32°15′40″N 64°49′38″W	Southampton	In Little Sound.
Hall Island		32°20′21″N 64°42′46″W	Hamilton	In Harrington Sound. Also known as Hall's Island.
Hawkins Island		32°17′10″N 64°49′43″W	Warwick	In Great Sound.
Hen Island		32°22′33″N 64°40′16″W	St. George's	In St. George's Harbour.
Heron Rock		32°18′42″N 64°50′48″W	Sandys	Off the coast of Ireland Island.
Higgs' Island		32°22′40″N 64°39′45″W	St. George's	At the entrance to St. George's Harbour.
Hinson Island, Paget		32°16′55″N 64°48′10″W	Paget	In Great Sound. Formerly called Godet's Island, and part of Warwick Parish.
Hinson's Island, Pembroke		32°17′58″N 64°48′34″W	Pembroke	In Great Sound.
Horn Rock		32°20′36″N 64°39′59″W	St. George's	In mouth of Castle Harbour.
Horseshoe Island		32°22′39″N 64°39′52″W	St. George's	At the entrance to St. George's Harbour.
Hospital Island		32°18′45″N 64°50′45″W	Sandys	Off the coast of Ireland Island.
Idol Island		32°20′44″N 64°39′40″W	St. George's	In mouth of Castle Harbour.
Inner Island		32°18′40″N 64°51′50″W	Sandys	Off the north coast of Somerset Island. Also known as Inner King's Point.
Inner Pear Rock		32°21′03″N 64°39′08″W	St. George's	Off southeast coast of Saint David's Island.
Iota Island		32°17′06″N 64°49′23″W	Warwick	In Great Sound.
Ireland Island		32°19′31″N 64°50′09″W	Sandys	Northwest Bermuda, in main chain.
Irresistible Island		32°16′55″N 64°48′46″W	Warwick	In Great Sound.
Kerep Island		32°17′14″N 64°49′32″W	Warwick	In Great Sound. Also known as Kappa Rock.
Lambda Island		32°17′20″N 64°49′50″W	Warwick	In Great Sound.
Lefroy Island		32°17′28″N 64°48′42″W	Pembroke	In Great Sound.
Little Oswego Island		32°22′03″N 64°39′38″W	St. George's	In Smith's Sound.
Little Rogue's Island		32°21′57″N 64°42′27″W	St. George's	Off southern St. George's Island.
Long Bird Island		32°21′53″N 64°41′50″W	St. George's	Now incorporated into Saint David's Island.
Long Island, Saint George's		32°21′45″N 64°40′32″W	St. George's	Now incorporated into Saint David's Island.
Long Island, Warwick		32°17′10″N 64°49′10″W	Warwick	In Great Sound.
Long Rock		32°21′26″N 64°39′17″W	St. George's	Off east coast of Saint David's Island.
Malabar Island		32°18′43″N 64°51′07″W	Sandys	Off the coast of Boaz Island.
Marshall Island, Warwick		32°17′00″N 64°48′34″W	Warwick	In Great Sound.
Middle Island		32°18′43″N 64°51′45″W	Sandys	Off the north coast of Somerset Island. Also known as Middle King's Point.
Moresby's Island		32°19′05″N 64°50′29″W	Sandys	Off the coast of Ireland Island.
Morgan's Island, Ely's Harbour		32°17′15″N 64°52′40″W	Sandys	At the entrance to Ely's Harbour.
Morgan's Island, Great Sound		32°16′15″N 64°51′00″W	Sandys	Now incorporated into the main island as Morgan's Point.
Mount Island		32°18′27″N 64°48′48″W	Pembroke	On north coast of main island, north of Spanish Point.
Mouse Island		32°18′04″N 64°48′34″W	Pembroke	In Great Sound, south of Spanish Point.
Nelly Island		32°17′05″N 64°49′28″W	Warwick	In Great Sound.
No Name Island		32°17′02″N 64°48′52″W	Warwick	In Great Sound.
Nonsuch Island		32°20′52″N 64°39′48″W	St. George's	In mouth of Castle Harbour. Formerly called Nonesuch Island.
One Tree Island		32°18′34″N 64°51′48″W	Sandys	Off the north coast of Somerset Island.
Ordnance Island		32°22′49″N 64°40′35″W	St. George's (town)	In St. George's Harbour.
Outer Island		32°18′45″N 64°51′42″W	Sandys	Off the north coast of Somerset Island. Also known as Outer King's Point.
Outer Pear Rock		32°20′55″N 64°39′03″W	St. George's	Off southeast coast of Saint David's Island.
Paget Island		32°22′30″N 64°39′35″W	St. George's	At the entrance to St. George's Harbour.
Palm Island		32°18′11″N 64°52′44″W	Sandys	At the entrance to Ely's Harbour.
Partridge Island		32°17′54″N 64°48′32″W	Pembroke	In Great Sound.
Pearl Island		32°17′30″N 64°50′14″W	Warwick	In Great Sound.
Peggy's Island		32°22′30″N 64°40′15″W	St. George's	In St. George's Harbour.
Perot Island		32°15′38″N 64°49′49″W	Southampton	In Little Sound.
Ports Island		32°17′00″N 64°49′15″W	Warwick	In Great Sound.
The Quintons		32°18′50″N 64°51′31″W	Sandys	Low-lying reef islands north of Somerset Island.
Rabbit Island		32°19′58″N 64°43′48″W	Hamilton	In Harrington Sound.
Regatta Island		32°18′45″N 64°50′35″W	Sandys	Off the coast of Ireland Island. Sometimes referred to as The Regatta Island.
Reid Island		32°17′10″N 64°47′56″W	Paget	In Hamilton Harbour.
Rickett's Island		32°16′34″N 64°49′43″W	Warwick	In Great Sound. Also known as Alexi Island.
Riddell's Island		32°15′43″N 64°49′43″W	Southampton	In Little Sound.
Rogue Island		32°21′53″N 64°42′30″W	St. George's	Off southern St. George's Island.
Rushy Island		32°20′15″N 64°40′25″W	St. George's	In mouth of Castle Harbour.
Saint David's Island		32°22′00″N 64°40′30″W	St. George's	Northeast Bermuda. Easternmost island of main chain.
Saint George's Island		32°23′00″N 64°40′30″W	St. George's	Northeast Bermuda. Northernmost island of main chain.
Saltus Island		32°17′27″N 64°48′01″W	Pembroke	In Hamilton Harbour.
Smith's Island		32°22′15″N 64°39′50″W	St. George's	Largest island in St. George's Harbour.
Somerset Island		32°17′47″N 64°52′10″W	Sandys	Northwest Bermuda, in main chain.
Spectacle Island, Paget		32°17′15″N 64°48′04″W	Paget	In Hamilton Harbour.
Spectacle Island, Southampton		32°15′30″N 64°50′02″W	Southampton	In Little Sound.
Theta Island		32°17′09″N 64°48′58″W	Warwick	In Great Sound.
Tilley Island		32°18′29″N 64°48′55″W	Pembroke	On north coast of main island, north of Spanish Point.
Trunk Island		32°20′00″N 64°43′37″W	Hamilton	In Harrington Sound.
Tucker's Island		32°16′15″N 64°51′30″W	Sandys	Now incorporated into the main island as Morgan's Point.
Turtle Island		32°19′21″N 64°42′56″W	Smith's	In Harrington Sound.
Verrill Island		32°17′24″N 64°48′47″W	Pembroke	In Great Sound.
Watford Island		32°18′23″N 64°51′24″W	Sandys	Northwest Bermuda, in main chain.
Watling Island		32°17′07″N 64°48′27″W	Warwick	In Great Sound.
Westcott Island		32°21′43″N 64°40′19″W	St. George's	Now incorporated into Saint David's Island.
Whale Island, Sandys		32°16′42″N 64°52′54″W	Sandys	In Ely's Harbour.
Whalers Island, Saint George's		32°22′27″N 64°39′56″W	St. George's	In St. George's Harbour.
White Island, Paget		32°17′17″N 64°47′04″W	Paget	In Hamilton Harbour. Also called White's Island.
Zeta Island		32°16′52″N 64°49′12″W	Warwick	In Great Sound.

== See also ==
- Geography of Bermuda
