= Bermuda Base Command =

Coordinates: 32°20′N 64°45′W

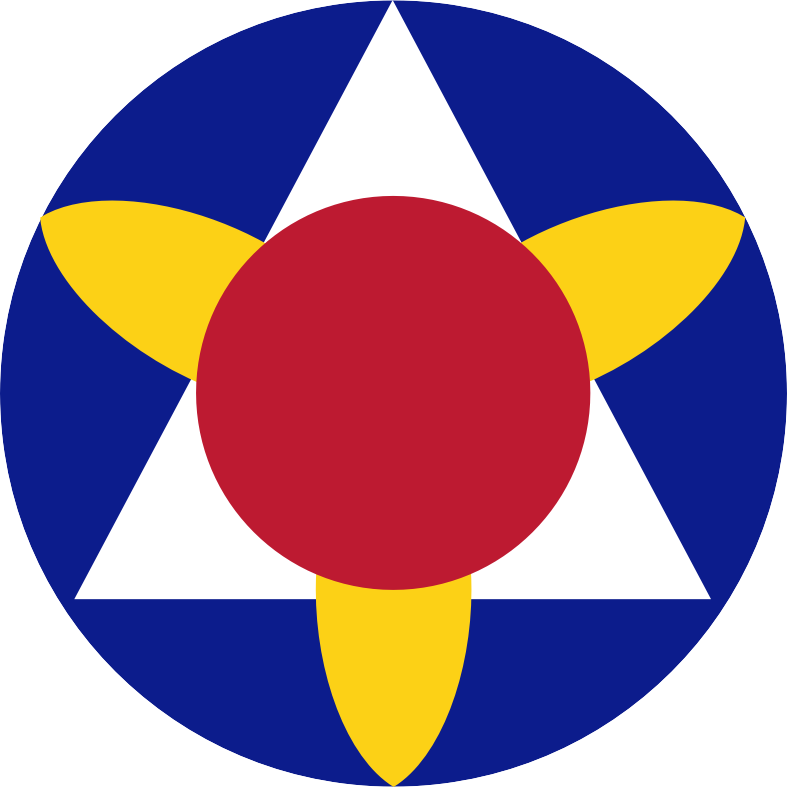
- 1942–1943 Shoulder Sleeve Insignia
- Active: April 1941–c. 1948
- Country: United States
- Branch: United States Army
- Type: Command
- Part of: Eastern Defense Command
- Garrison/HQ: Fort Bell, St. David's Island

The Bermuda Base Command was a command of the United States Army, established to defend the British Colony of Bermuda, located 640 miles off Cape Hatteras, North Carolina. It was created in April 1941 when United States Army troops were sent to the island.

== History ==
=== Development of Imperial defenses of Bermuda ===
Although the British Army had maintained a small detachment in Bermuda since 1701 (an independent company, or, later, a detachment from the Bahamas' independent company), Bermuda's military defence had been left by the English and British governments largely in the hands of its own militia until the Royal Navy took an interest in the colony as a base due to the loss of all of its continental bases on the Atlantic seaboard south of the Maritimes following the independence of the colonies that would form the United States of America. Bermuda was elevated to the status of an Imperial fortress. Vast sums were poured into improving the fortifications and batteries the new Bermuda Garrison inherited from the militia, and building new ones. Two large army bases were established, known as St. George's Garrison and Prospect Camp, and various smaller facilities, including Warwick Camp, Clarence Barracks on Boaz Island, Ordnance Island, and a secret munitions depot on Agar's Island, among others. By the 1860s, the expense began to cause grave concerns for the British government. A sizeable portion of Imperial defence expenditure had been lavished on Bermuda. A large number of artillery pieces had been emplaced (with additional mobile guns kept ready in the main camps to be moved as required to parts of the shoreline that lacked permanent defences), but the number of artillerymen needed to man them all was far greater than that available. Rapid advances in artillery in the latter 19th Century meant that many of the guns, and even the fortifications themselves, were obsolete by the time they were ready for use. Following the Crimean War, fought with too little funds and too few professional soldiers, the government was faced with the task of redeploying much of the British Army back from Imperial garrisons to protect the increasingly imperilled United Kingdom, without weakening Imperial defences to the point of encouraging native insurrections or foreign invasions.

The Bermuda government had allowed the militia to lapse following the American War of 1812, and the British government failed for decades to implore or goad it to raise a new reserve for the regular army. It succeeded in doing this by ransoming its approval of the American investment required for the erection of the Princess Hotel in the 1880s, which the local government intended to be the flagship of its nascent tourism industry, and of the widening of a shipping channel required for St. George's to remain a useful port. The local government raised two part-time units, the Bermuda Militia Artillery to reinforce the Royal Garrison Artillery, and the Bermuda Volunteer Rifle Corps to reinforce the regular infantry battalion. These units were raised under legislation drafted by the national government and passed to the colonial legislature, the House of Assembly, to en-act. As national security and defence were not areas of governance delegated to local government, the British Government maintains control of all British military units, including colonial units, although it has preferred to work through local governments to enact legislation and the British Parliament has, throughout the history of the empire, attempted to place the financial burden of defence on the local governments, obliging colonial governments to make payments towards the costs of regular garrisons (which most were reluctant to do, knowing that the regular garrison units might still be re-deployed elsewhere on the outbreak of war), not providing regular garrisons to colonies deemed unimportant to Imperial defence strategy, or prodding local governments to both raise and fund reserve home-defence units which ultimately remained under British Government control, via the Governor and Commander-in-Chief of the colony.

As an Imperial fortress, the British Government could not ignore Bermuda's defence, and as the local government had refused for decades to be bullied or duped into shouldering any part of the cost of the garrison, it fully-funded the new reserve units, which were considered fully parts of the British Army rather than auxiliary forces (as the Yeomanry, Militia, and Volunteer force in the British Isles and British Empire originally were, and most in the British Overseas Territories remain), and which were necessarily incorporated into the regular garrison with their roles defined in the Imperial Defence Plan.

Following the First World War, with the removal of the threat posed to Britain maritime supremacy by the German navy, a peace that was presumed to be lasting, and a policy of economic austerity to recover from the cost of the war, the British Army was reduced below its pre-war capacity, with most colonial garrisons either removed or slashed. As Bermuda, with its Royal Naval Dockyard and, should it be captured, its potential usefulness to an enemy as a base to be used against British shipping, could not be left undefended, the War Office re-organised the local reserves from Militia and Volunteer units to Territorial units (the BVRC converted in 1921 and the BMA in 1928, though neither unit's name was updated to reflect the change) to enable the withdrawal of regular units, and funded new reserve units, which included the Bermuda Volunteer Engineers (created in 1930), and the Bermuda Militia Infantry and the Home Guard (both created during the Second World War).

=== British naval and military establishment in Bermuda in 1941–42 ===
By the time war was declared in 1939, the professional component of the army garrison had been reduced to the Commander-in-Chief (normally a Lieutenant-General or Major-General, who also held the office of civil Governor of Bermuda) and his Aide-de-Camp (usually a Lieutenant of the corps or regiment from which the Commander-in-Chief had been removed on becoming a substantive Major-General), a Command Staff, a detachment of infantry from whichever battalion was stationed at Jamaica (from the 1st Battalion, Sherwood Foresters (Nottinghamshire and Derbyshire Regiment)), a detachment of Royal Engineers, a detachment of the Royal Army Service Corps, 25 Company of the Royal Army Medical Corps, a detachment of the Royal Army Ordnance Corps, and a detachment of the Royal Army Pay Corps.

The Royal Artillery and Royal Engineers had withdrawn their regular companies entirely in 1928, leaving their roles to their part-time reserves (the Bermuda Militia Artillery and Bermuda Volunteer Engineers). These units being small, only a single battery, the two 6 inch guns at St. David's Battery, was maintained ready-for-war, although a second battery (another two 6 inch guns at Warwick Camp) was added on the commencement of hostilities. These few aging artillery pieces lacked the range and firepower that would be needed to fend off a capital ship, and the activities of German commerce raiding pocket battleships and cruisers were of great concern, especially as Bermuda became a forming-up point for trans-Atlantic convoys. The Atlantic activities of the Admiral Scheer in Autumn and Winter, 1940, were particularly alarming. Other inviting targets in Bermuda included the dockyard, and the Royal Naval Air Station on Boaz Island, the Royal Air Force Darrell's Island airbase, the trans-Atlantic telecommunications cable of Cable & Wireless, and facilities which aided trans-Atlantic navigation by ships and aircraft.

In 1942, with the buildup of American units and artillery in Bermuda, as well as the containment of the German and Italian surface fleets to home waters, the moratorium on drafts overseas from the local units (which had been emplaced after a BVRC contingent had been sent to the Lincolnshire Regiment in England (with BMA and BVE attachments joining their respective corps) in June 1940) was lifted. As a consequence, in 1943 a Command Training Battalion was composed from contingents of volunteers from the BVRC and the BMA and BMI to prepare for deployment to Europe (the BVRC element traveled to England as a rifle company to join the Lincolnshire Regiment). The BMA and BMI soldiers were sent to North Carolina as the training cadre for the newly formed Caribbean Regiment, serving thereafter as part of that regiment in Italy, North Africa, and Palestine.

=== Support of the Allies by the neutral USA ===
The United States Navy had been leased White's Island during the last year of the First World War as its Base 24, to service submarine hunters (and other small vessels that required a staging post in order to cross the Atlantic Ocean) it was deploying in the Atlantic to protect shipping to Europe. It was also permitted to operate a supply station on Agar's Island. These facilities had both been closed on the end of hostilities.

During the early years of the Second World War, the US Government, under President Franklin Delano Roosevelt, sought to aid Britain and her allies again, although internal US politics kept it from being a legal participant until Japan, Germany, and Italy declared war upon it at the close of 1941. The support the neutral US had provided to Britain included co-operating on various levels of foreign policy, enabling Britain to purchase war materiel from American manufacturers, co-operating on counter-espionage (all trans-Atlantic mails from the US to Europe were secretly landed at Bermuda for inspection by British censors searching for secret communications that enabled the discovery of Axis spies in the USA), the US Navy and the US Army Air Forces were taking an increasing role in protecting allied shipping from German U-boats (the first US Navy vessel lost in the war, the destroyer Reuben James, part of the Neutrality Patrol, was sunk by the German U-boat U-552 while escorting Convoy HX 156 across the Atlantic from Halifax in October, 1941), and relieving British forces from guarding strategic neutral territories, and her own overseas territories, allowing British forces to be redeployed to more active theatres of war. This last included the agreement by which Britain handed over to the US the duty of guarding Iceland from German invasion, the first American units arriving there on 7 July 1941. The Reuben James, at the time of her loss, was operating from the new naval base constructed by Britain at Hvalfjordur.

As the war expanded (Germany had invaded the Soviet Union at the end of June), and Britain's purchases from US factories seriously upset the balance of trade, Roosevelt's government considered new ways to assist the Allied war effort without violating US neutrality, or the sensibilities of isolationist voters. The most important result was the Lend-Lease Agreement, and its precursor, the Destroyers for Bases Agreement, by which the US Government loaned war materiel (and transferred outright 50 First World War-era destroyers) to the British Commonwealth (and later to other allies) in exchange for 99-year leases of land in British territories for the purpose of building US military and naval bases. This was portrayed to American voters as a major coup for the US, gaining at little cost the use of bases that would be invaluable to US national security for the next century. Not emphasised was that this had the sleight-of-hand effect of placing the defence of those territories in US hands, allowing British forces to be redeployed to more active theatres, and that the construction of these bases would involve the US paying for and carrying out improvements to road networks and infrastructure in these territories, from which Britain would benefit.

=== American airbases in Bermuda ===
The Destroyers for Bases Agreement was originally meant to give the US leases in a number of West Indian territories. Ultimately, neither of the two most important base locations, both from the perspective of defending the United States from attack, and for the purposes of aiding and protecting air and sea transport across the Atlantic, was in the West Indies. As they were not originally part of the Agreement, the 99-year leases granted to the US for bases in Bermuda and Newfoundland were consequently free, with no destroyers or other war materiel received in exchange.

Two bases were planned for Bermuda, a US Navy base to cater to both shipping and flying boats, and a United States Army Air Forces airfield to allow landplanes to use Bermuda as a trans-Atlantic staging post as only seaplanes had previously been able to. When American surveyors arrived in 1941, the Bermudian government was horrified to learn that tentative plans called for depopulating and levelling most of the West of the archipelago and infilling the Great Sound to create an airfield. The Governor of Bermuda made desperate protestations to the British Government, and a less catastrophic plan was drawn up.

The US Navy's Naval Operating Base was a peninsula created by levelling and joining two small islands together, and to the mainland. Like Darrell's Island, it served only seaplanes. Whereas the RAF, Imperial Airways, and Pan American World Airways used Darrell's only as a staging point for trans-Atlantic flights, the US Navy based a patrol squadron at its base to maintain air patrols within the area (a role that had been performed 'til then on an ad hoc basis by the Fleet Air Arm at Boaz Island).

The US Army established Fort Bell on St. David's Island. The main purpose of this base was originally to host the engineers building the air station, which was achieved also by levelling small islands, infilling waterways, and creating a single landmass contiguous with St. David's Island. The airfield became active as Kindley Field in 1943. As per the agreement, this airfield was used jointly by the US Army Air Forces and the Royal Air Force (which transferred its Transport Command from Darrell's Island, although its Ferry Command remained at the flying boat base).

=== US Army ground forces in Bermuda ===
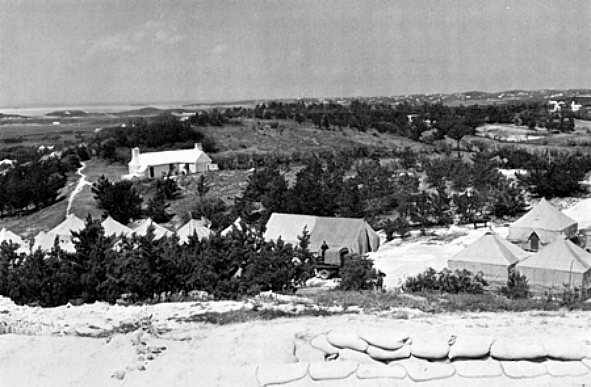
US Army camp at Turtle Hill Bermuda in WWII

In addition to the airbases, the US built up a large garrison to protect its new assets and the entire archipelago from attack or invasion. US Army coast and field artillery batteries were put in long-term emplacements around Bermuda, from St. George's Island to Southampton. This greatly supplemented the artillery defenses of the Bermuda Militia Artillery, the active forts of which contained only four 6-inch guns in April 1941, at St David's Battery and Warwick Camp.

The United States Army Coast Artillery Corps deployed coastal defense weapons in Bermuda beginning in April 1941. A Harbor Defense Command was established to coordinate these weapons with each other and with British defenses. Battery F, 52nd Coast Artillery Regiment (Railway 8-inch gun) and Battery B, 57th Coast Artillery Regiment (155 mm gun) (Mobile) initially manned the guns. Company G, 11th Infantry Regiment, arrived at the same time for ground defense. On 20 February 1942 the US coast artillery units in Bermuda were combined as the 27th Coast Artillery Battalion (Composite); these were Battery F, 52nd CA and Batteries B, G, and H (searchlight) of the 53rd Coast Artillery Regiment; the latter three had been redesignated from components of the 57th CA in July 1941. By June 1941 the company of the 11th Infantry was replaced by the 3rd Battalion, 89th Infantry Regiment and Battery A, 214th Field Artillery Battalion, at Fort Langton with four 105 mm howitzers. In April 1942 the Bermuda Base Command was placed under the US Eastern Defense Command. The 27th CA Battalion was inactivated in Bermuda on 1 June 1944.

The US coast artillery firing batteries included:

Location	No. of guns	Gun type	Carriage type	Years active
Scaur Hill Fort	2	8-inch gun M1888	railway M1918	1941-1944
Fort Victoria	2	8-inch gun M1888	railway M1918	1941-1944
Turtle Hill	2	155 mm gun M1918	towed with "Panama mounts"	1942-1946
Cooper's Island	2	155 mm gun M1918	towed with "Panama mounts"	1942-1946
Tudor (Stone) Hill	2	6-inch gun M1905	shielded barbette M1	1943-1946
Fort Victoria	2	6-inch gun M1905	shielded barbette M1	1943-1946
Fort Victoria	4	90 mm gun	fixed T2/M1	unknown

The railway guns were placed on short sections of track that were not connected to rail lines. The 6-inch batteries at Tudor Hill and Fort Victoria were known as Battery Construction Numbers 283 and 284, respectively. The 90 mm guns were dual-purpose, and were called Anti-Motor Torpedo Boat guns.

=== Postwar ===
The United States Army would continue to garrison Bermuda for the remainder of the war. Following the end of hostilities, the ground forces were withdrawn, other than those required for the defense of Fort Bell and Kindley Field. On 1 January 1946 the US Army Air Transport Command took control of the entire base. The airfield ceased to be distinguished within the base, as the name Fort Bell was discontinued, and Kindley Field was applied to the entire facility. The US Army finally exited Bermuda in 1948, when the US Army Air Forces became the independent United States Air Force, and Kindley Field Kindley Air Force Base.

== See also ==
- Caribbean Defense Command
- Greenland Base Command
- Iceland Base Command
- Newfoundland Base Command
- Seacoast defense in the United States
- Alaska Defense Command
- Northwest Service Command
