= Bluck's Island, Bermuda =

Island in Bermuda

Bluck's Island
- Location within Bermuda

Geography
- Location: Warwick
- Coordinates: 32.28640°N 64.81011°W
- Length: 291 m (955 ft)
- Highest elevation: 9 m (30 ft)

Administration
- Bermuda

Bluck's Island (formerly Denslow's Island, Dyer's Island) is an island of Bermuda. It lies in the harbor of Hamilton in Warwick Parish.

Previously known as Dyer's island, it was once owned by the Dyer family in the 19th century. Originally owned by Henry Thomas Dyer, son of Patrick O'dwyer.

In the early 20th century the island was owned by illustrator William Wallace Denslow who built a house there and declared himself "King Denslow I, Monarch of Denslow Islands and Protector of Coral Reefs".

Between 1917 and 1919, the island hosted the Bermuda Biological Station for Research; this was transferred for the period from Agar's Island, which had been "requisitioned for military purposes".
