= Rogue Island =

Rogue Island or Rogue's Island may refer to:

- Rogue Island, Bermuda, an island of Bermuda
- Little Rogue's Island, an island of Bermuda
- Rhode Island, a U.S. state (facetiously nicknamed "Rogue's Island" in the 18th century)
