= Alpha Island, Bermuda =

Island of Bermuda

Alpha Island
Nickname: Diving Board Island
- Location of Alpha Island in the Great Sound

- Location within Bermuda
- Etymology: First letter of the Greek alphabet

Geography
- Location: Great Sound
- Coordinates: 32.2833322°N 64.83333°W
- Adjacent to: Atlantic Ocean

Administration
- Bermuda
- Parish: Warwick

Alpha Island is an island of Bermuda, located in the Great Sound. It may be better known as "Diving Board Island", or "Jump Rock", as it is a popular spot for cliff jumping.

== In popular culture ==
In 2018, Snapchat allowed users to enable the new alpha version of its Android app, Snapchat Alpha, by clicking on an easter egg in Alpha Island.
