= United States Naval Station White's Island, Bermuda =

Coordinates: 32°17′19″N 64°47′04″W

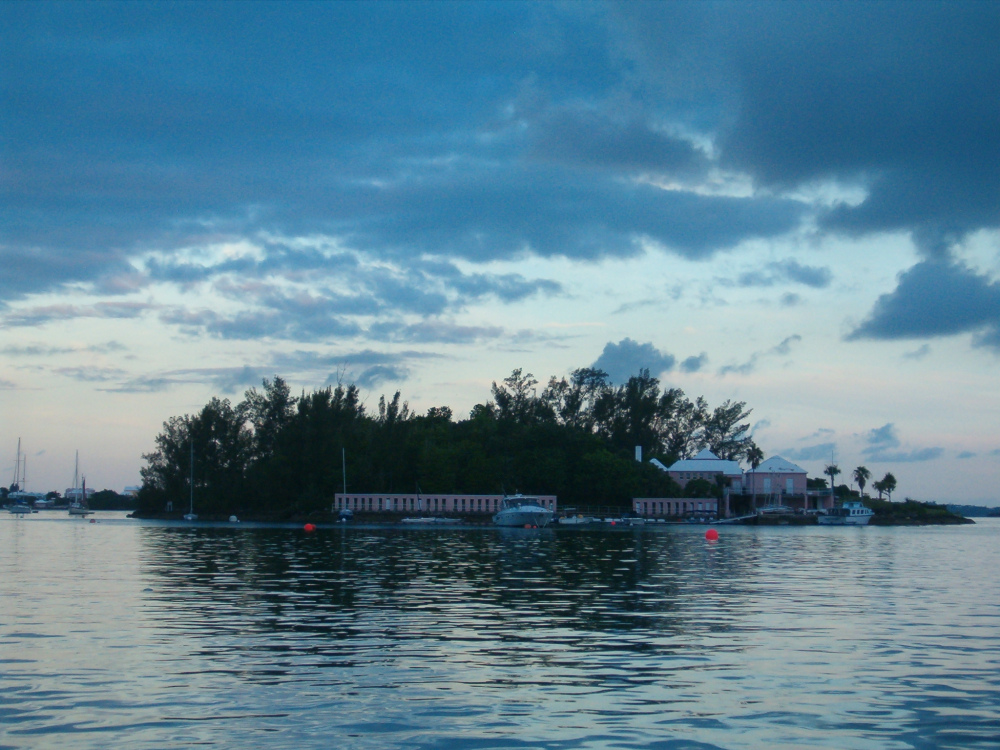
White's Island in 2006

The United States Naval Station Whites Island was a United States Navy (USN) facility located on White's Island in Hamilton Harbour, in the British Colony of Bermuda, 640 miles off the coast of North Carolina.

It was established during the First World War (or the Great War, as it was originally known in Britain) by the US Navy for use by anti-submarine vessels transiting on their way from the United States to the European theatre of operations.

Bermuda had already housed the Admiralty House, dockyard, and naval base of the North America and West Indies Squadron since the American War of Independence had cost the Royal Navy all of its continental bases between Nova Scotia and the West Indies. During the Great War, the Royal Naval vessels based in Bermuda had been used to enforce Britain's control of the Atlantic, hunting down German commerce raiders and fighting the Battle of the Falkland Islands. Bermuda's location in the North Atlantic, the presence of the Royal Naval base, and the enclosing barrier reef that protected its anchorages from submarines, resulted in the colony becoming a major forming-up point for trans-Atlantic convoys (Bermuda would serve all these roles and more during the Second World War) used as a convoy staging point during both World War I and World War II.

When the US entered the war in 1917, it required a staging point for smaller anti-submarine vessels that were deploying to Europe to use during the voyage across the Atlantic. Most of the small islands in Hamilton Harbour and the Great Sound, including White's Island, were at that point property of the Royal Navy or the British Army. Other than several of the islands, which had been used to isolate servicemen infected with Yellow Fever, and as a Prisoner of War (POW) camp for Boer prisoners during the Second Boer War, and Agar's Island, a secret British Army munitions depot, these islands had seen little development or use.

On 15 April 1918, US Naval Captain, W. G. Cutter, arrived in Bermuda on the SS Arethusa to assume command of the new US Naval Base 24. Together with a US Naval detachment, operation a supply station on Agar's Island, this station operated for the remainder of the war, serving one hundred and twenty-six transiting submarine hunters, which travelled in convoys of between one and two dozen vessels (one vessel sank in Two Rock Passage, the main channel into Hamilton Harbour. It was refloated, but sank again off Agar's Island).

The US bases were closed on 1 April 1919 (by when the senior US Naval officer in Bermuda was Captain Richard H. Jackson), following the cessation of hostilities.

== See also ==
(For a full list of British Empire and Commonwealth and United States naval, military, and air bases historically and currently located in Bermuda, see Military of Bermuda).

=== Other US bases in Bermuda ===
- United States Navy Supply Station, Bermuda at Agar's Island. First World War.
- US Naval Operating Base, Naval Station Bermuda, Naval Air Station Bermuda, and NAS Bermuda Annex. 1941-1995.
- United States Navy Submarine Base, Ordnance Island. Second World War.
- United States Navy, Naval Facility Bermuda. (Tudor Hill) 1954-1995.
- United States Army, Fort Bell 1941-1948
- United States Army Air Forces, Kindley Field. 1943-1948.
- United States Air Force, Kindley Air Force Base. 1948-1970.
- United States Army Bermuda Garrison. 1941-1945
- United States Navy, Naval Air Station Bermuda (originally Kindley Field) 1970-1995.
- United States Coast Guard Air-Sea Rescue, at Naval Station Bermuda and Kindley AFB
- National Air and Space Administration, at Kindley AFB/US NAS Bermuda

=== Other naval bases in Bermuda ===
- Royal Naval Dockyard Bermuda, and the Royal Navy in Bermuda 1795-1995.
- Royal Navy (Fleet Air Arm), Royal Naval Air Station Boaz Island (HMS Malabar)
- Royal Canadian Navy, HMCS Somers Isles. 1944-1945.
- Royal Canadian Navy, Naval Radio Station Bermuda. 1944-1968.
- Canadian Forces Station Bermuda, Daniel's Head. 1968-1993.
