= Somerset Island =

Somerset Island may refer to:

- Somerset Island, Bermuda
- Somerset Island (Nunavut), Canada
