= Agar's Island, Bermuda =

Island in Bermuda

Agar's Island
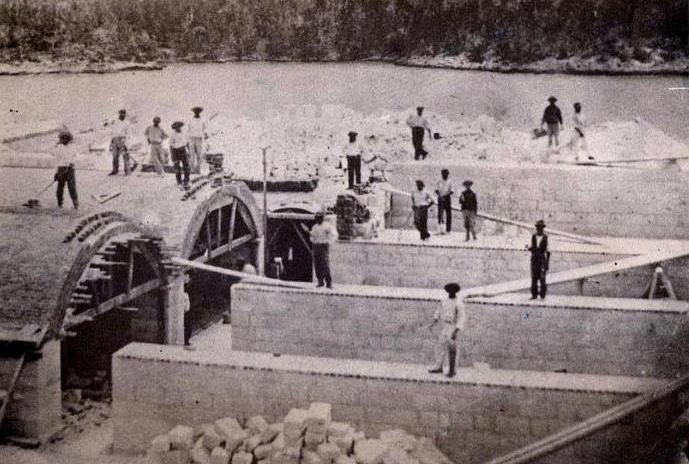
- Construction of British Army's magazine on Agar's Island, Bermuda in 1870

- Location within Bermuda

Geography
- Location: Great Sound
- Coordinates: 32.294°N 64.809°W

Administration
- Bermuda
- Parish: Pembroke Parish

Agar's Island is an island of Bermuda. Located in the Great Sound, near to the shore of Pembroke Parish, it was owned by billionaire James Martin, and was historically a secret munitions store, part of the Bermuda Garrison of the British Army.

== History ==
Bermuda had become an Imperial fortress, the primary base, dockyard, and headquarters of the North America and West Indies Squadron of the Royal Navy following the independence of the US. The British Army had consequently garrisoned and heavily fortified the colony.

In the 1790s, when the Royal Navy had begun planning what would become the Royal Naval Dockyard on Ireland Island, it had purchased most of the smaller islands in the Great Sound and Hamilton Harbour. Although the Royal Navy made occasional use of these smaller islands, it was to be the army that would carry out the greatest development on them. Many were used to compose a Prisoner-of-War camp during and after the Second Boer War. Agar's, however, was to see another use.

Although the ring of fortresses operated by the Royal Garrison Artillery held munitions stores in their magazines, central supply depots were also operated by the Royal Army Ordnance Corps, which operated a depot on Ordnance Island, dangerously close to the King's Square of St. George's town. In 1870, a secret, underground powder magazine was built on Agar's Island, reputed to be the largest in the world at that time, although the army remained highly secretive of its existence. The magazine still exists, restored by James Martin, although it is not open to the public.

During the final year of the First World War, the United States Navy was permitted to establish a supply station on Agar's Island, as well as a Naval station on White's Island. These facilities were closed on 1st April, 1919, following the cessation of hostilities.
