= Edward Bailey (disambiguation) =

Edward Bailey (1814–1903) was a missionary artist.

Edward Bailey may also refer to:

- Edward Battersby Bailey (1881–1965), English geologist
- Edward Phillip Bailey, member of the Parliament of Bermuda
- Edward Bailey, a character in the film Red 2 played by Anthony Hopkins
- Edward Bailey, victim of the mutiny on Victory
- Edward Bailey (hammer thrower), winner of the 1962 NCAA DI hammer throw championship

== See also ==
- Edward Baily (disambiguation)
- Edward Bayley (disambiguation)
- Ed Bailey (1931–2007), American baseball player
- Teddy Bailey (1944–2021), American football player
