= Saltus Island, Bermuda =

Island of Bermuda

Coordinates: 32°17′N 64°48′W

Saltus Island is an island of Bermuda in Pembroke Parish.

Named after the Saltus family that once owned it. It is now owned by the Bermuda National Trust and managed as a conservation project by the science department at Saltus Grammar School.
