= Ely's Harbour, Bermuda =

Natural harbour of Bermuda

Coordinates: 32°17′00″N 64°52′50″W

Ely's Harbour is a natural harbour on the west coast of Bermuda.

The harbour is located between the northwestern tip of the mainland and the southern end of Somerset Island. The harbour is guarded from the Atlantic Ocean by a string of islands across its mouth, the largest of which are Bethell's Island, Bermuda and Morgan's Island.

The harbour has two natural arms, The Scaur in the east, and Pilchard Bay in the south. At its easternmost extreme, Ely's Harbour is connected to the Great Sound by a narrow channel which passes under the historic Somerset Bridge.
