= Gibbet Island, Bermuda =

Island of Bermuda

Coordinates: 32°19.4′N 64°44.6′W

Gibbet Island is an island of Bermuda. It is located at the mouth of Flatt's Inlet which leads to Harrington Sound. Its name arises from the fact that criminals were gibbetted, or hung here. Flatt's inlet was not a major shipping route so the reason for hanging the slaves here was not for the benefit of incoming vessels but instead because locals did not want to have hangings on the mainland due to superstition. Witches were also burned here.

Today, the property is owned by a private family.
