= Little Sound =

Body of water in Bermuda

Coordinates: 32°15′43″N 64°51′02″W

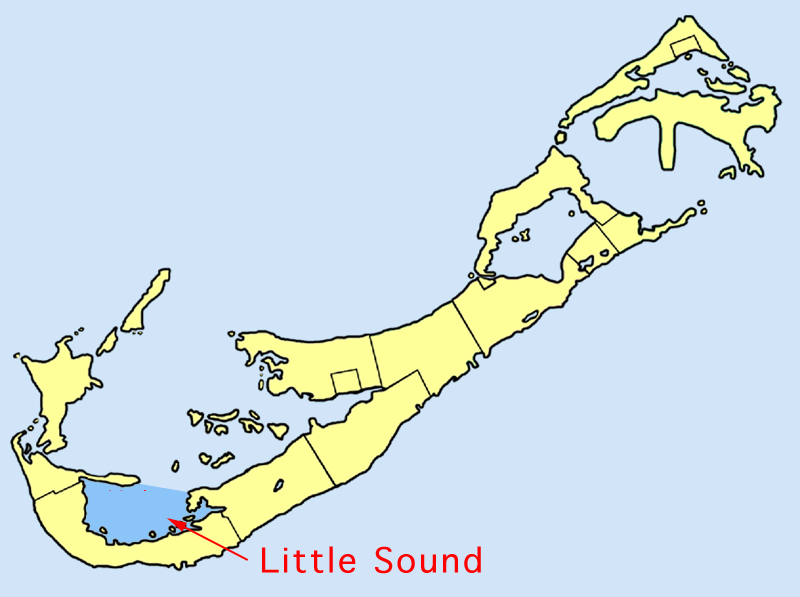

The Little Sound in Bermuda is a small part of the Great Sound, the body of water that is almost entirely encircled by the Bermuda chain in the west of the territory. The Little Sound lies at the south of the Great Sound, and is separated from it by two peninsulas which extend into the sound from Sandys Parish in the west and Warwick Parish in the east.
