= Hen Island, Bermuda =

Island of Bermuda

Coordinates: 32°23′N 64°40′W

Hen Island is an island of Bermuda. A human skeleton believed to belong to Thomas Squires, a gunman who died on the island in 1825, was unearthed in 2011.
