= St. Anthony's Church, Warwick =

Catholic church in Bermuda

Coordinates: 32°15′49″N 64°48′57″W

St. Anthony's Church
- St. Anthony's Church
- Location: Warwick
- Country: Bermuda; United Kingdom
- Denomination: Catholic Church
- Sui iuris church: Latin Church

The Church of St. Anthony is a parish of the Catholic Church located at 26 Middle Road in the town of Warwick in the south of the main island of the British Overseas Territory of Bermuda, in the Diocese of Hamilton in Bermuda (Dioecesis Hamiltonensis in Bermuda).

It was built and consecrated between 1957 and 1958.

Its name derives from the devotion of the Portuguese community in Bermuda to St. Anthony of Lisbon (Santo António de Lisboa), better known as St. Anthony of Padua, a priest of the Franciscan Order, preacher and Portuguese theologian.

== See also ==
- Catholic Church in the United Kingdom
- Stella Maris Church
