= War Office =

British Government department, 1857 to 1964

- Royal Coat of Arms as used by HM Government

Department overview
- Formed: 1857; 169 years ago
- Preceding Department: Various
- Dissolved: 1964; 62 years ago
- Superseding Department: Ministry of Defence (MoD)
- Jurisdiction: Government of the United Kingdom
- Headquarters: War Office building Whitehall London; 51°30′20″N 0°07′33″W
- Department executive: Secretary of State for War
- Parent Department: HM Government

The War Office has referred to several British government organisations throughout history, all relating to the army. It was a department of the British Government responsible for the administration of the British Army between 1857 and 1964, at which point its functions were transferred to the new Ministry of Defence (MoD). It was equivalent to the Admiralty at that time, which was responsible for the Royal Navy (RN), and (much later) the Air Ministry, which oversaw the Royal Air Force (RAF). The name 'Old War Office' is also given to the former home of the department, located at the junction of Horse Guards Avenue and Whitehall in central London. The landmark building was sold on 1 March 2016 by HM Government for more than £350 million, on a 250-year lease, for conversion into a luxury hotel and residential apartments.

Prior to 1855, 'War Office' signified the office of the Secretary at War. In the 17th and 18th centuries, a number of independent offices and individuals were responsible for various aspects of Army administration. The most important were the Commander-in-Chief of the Forces, the Secretary at War, and the twin Secretaries of State; most of whose military responsibilities were passed to a new Secretary of State for War in 1794. Others who performed specialist functions were the controller of army accounts, the Army Medical Board, the Commissariat Department, the Board of General Officers, the Judge Advocate General of the Armed Forces, the Commissary General of Muster, the Paymaster General of the forces, and (particularly with regard to the Militia) the Home Office.

The term War Department was initially used for the separate office of the Secretary of State for War; in 1855, the offices of Secretary at War and Secretary of State for War were merged, and thereafter the terms War Office and War Department were used somewhat interchangeably.

== History ==
The War Office developed from the Council of War, an ad hoc grouping of the King and his senior military commanders which managed the Kingdom of England's wars and campaigns. The management of the War Office was directed initially by the Secretary at War, whose role had originated during the reign of King Charles II as the secretary to the Commander-in-Chief of the Army. In the latter part of the 17th century, the office of Commander-in-Chief was vacant for several periods, which left the Secretary at War answering directly to the Sovereign; and thereafter, even when the office of Commander-in-Chief was restored on a more permanent basis, the Secretary at War retained his independence.

The department of the Secretary at War was referred to as the 'Warr Office' (sic) from as early as 1694; its foundation has traditionally been ascribed to William Blathwayt, who had accompanied King William III during the Nine Years' War and who, from his appointment as Secretary in 1684, had greatly expanded the remit of his office to cover general day-to-day administration of the Army.

After Blathwayt's retirement in 1704, Secretary at War became a political office. In political terms, it was a fairly minor government job (despite retaining a continued right of access to the monarch) which dealt with the minutiae of administration, rather than grand strategy. The Secretary, who was usually a member of the House of Commons, routinely presented the House with the Army Estimates, and occasionally spoke on other military matters as required. In symbolic terms, he was seen as signifying parliamentary control over the Army. Issues of strategic policy during wartime were managed by the Northern and Southern Departments (the predecessors of today's Foreign Office and Home Office).

From 1704 to 1855 the post of Secretary remained occupied by a minister of the second rank (although he was occasionally part of the Cabinet after 1794). Many of his responsibilities were transferred to the Secretary of State for War after the creation of that more senior post in 1794 (though the latter was also responsible for Britain's colonies from 1801, and renamed Secretary of State for War and the Colonies, an arrangement which only ceased with the establishment of the Colonial Office in 1854).

From 1824 the British Empire (excepting India, which was administered separately by the East India Company and then the India Office) was divided by the War and Colonial Office into the following administrative departments:

North America

- Upper Canada, Lower Canada
- New Brunswick, Nova Scotia, Prince Edward Island
- Bermuda, Newfoundland

West Indies

Mediterranean and Africa

- Malta
- Gibraltar
- Ionian Islands
- Sierra Leone and the West African Forts, Consulates to the Barbary States

Eastern colonies

- New South Wales
- Van Dieman's Land
- Ceylon
- Mauritius

The War Office, after 1854 and until the 1867 confederation of the Dominion of Canada, was to split the military administration of the British Empire much as the War and Colonial Office had:

British colonial and foreign military districts and stations
District	Station
North America and North Atlantic	Bermuda (Prospect Camp; St. George's Garrison; Boaz and Watford Islands)† **; Halifax, Nova Scotia† **; Kingston, Canada West; New Brunswick; Newfoundland; New Westminster, British Columbia; Toronto, Canada West; Quebec, Canada East
West Indies	Bahamas; Barbados; British Honduras; Jamaica – Up Park Camp; Jamaica – Newcastle; Trinidad
Mediterranean	Corfu, United States of the Ionian Islands; Gibraltar **; Greece-Cephalonia; Greece-Zante; Malta **; Scutari, Turkey
West Coast of Africa and South Atlantic	Bathurst, Gambia Colony and Protectorate; Gold Coast; Sierra Leone; St. Helena
South Africa	Cape Colony – Cape Town; Cape Colony – Graham's Town; Natal
Egypt and the Sudan (Soudan)	Egypt – Assouan; Egypt – Korosko; Wady Halfa, Sudan
Indian Ocean	Ceylon – Colombo; Ceylon – Kandy; Ceylon – Nuwara Eliya; Ceylon – Trincomalee; Mauritius; Singapore
Australasia	Auckland, New Zealand; Fremantle, Western Australia; New South Wales
China	Hong Kong

** Indicates an Imperial Fortress
† Bermuda and Halifax were linked, under the Commander-in-Chief at Halifax, with units and strength at Bermuda included in figures for Halifax

In February 1855 the new Secretary of State for War was additionally commissioned as Secretary at War, thus giving the Secretary of State oversight of the War Office in addition to his own department. The same procedure was followed for each of his successors, until the office of Secretary at War was abolished altogether in 1863.

In 1855 the Board of Ordnance was abolished as a result of its perceived poor performance during the Crimean War. This powerful independent body, dating from the 15th century, had been directed by the Master-General of the Ordnance, usually a very senior military officer who (unlike the Secretary at War) was often a member of the Cabinet. The disastrous campaigns of the Crimean War resulted in the consolidation of all administrative duties in 1855 as subordinate to the Secretary of State for War, a Cabinet job. He was not, however, solely responsible for the Army; the Commander-in-Chief had a virtually equal degree of responsibility. This was reduced in theory by the reforms introduced by Edward Cardwell in 1870, which subordinated the Commander-in-Chief to the Secretary for War. In practice, however, a large influence was retained by the conservative Commander-in-Chief Field Marshal Prince George, 2nd Duke of Cambridge, who held the post between 1856 and 1895. His resistance to reform caused military efficiency to lag well behind that of Britain's rivals, a problem that became obvious during the Second Boer War. The situation was only remedied in 1904, when the job of Commander-in-Chief was abolished, and replaced with that of the Chief of the General Staff, which was replaced by the job of Chief of the Imperial General Staff in 1908. An Army Council was created with a format similar to that of the Board of Admiralty, directed by the Secretary of State for War, and an Imperial General Staff was established to coordinate Army administration. The creation of the Army Council was recommended by the War Office (Reconstitution) Committee, and formally appointed by Letters Patent dated 8 February 1904, and by Royal Warrant dated 12 February 1904.

The management of the War Office was hampered by persistent disputes between the civilian and military parts of the organisation. The government of H.H. Asquith attempted to resolve this during the First World War by appointing Lord Kitchener as Secretary for War. During his tenure, the Imperial General Staff was virtually dismantled. Its role was replaced effectively by the Committee of Imperial Defence, which debated broader military issues.

The War Office decreased greatly in importance after the First World War, a fact illustrated by the drastic reductions of its staff numbers during the inter-war period. Its responsibilities and funding were also reduced. In 1936, the government of Stanley Baldwin appointed a Minister for Co-ordination of Defence, who was not part of the War Office. When Winston Churchill became Prime Minister in 1940, he bypassed the War Office altogether, and appointed himself Minister of Defence (though there was, curiously, no ministry of defence until 1947). Clement Attlee continued this arrangement when he came to power in 1945, but appointed a separate Minister of Defence for the first time in 1947. In 1964, the present form of the Ministry of Defence was established, unifying the War Office, Admiralty, and Air Ministry.

== The Old War Office building ==
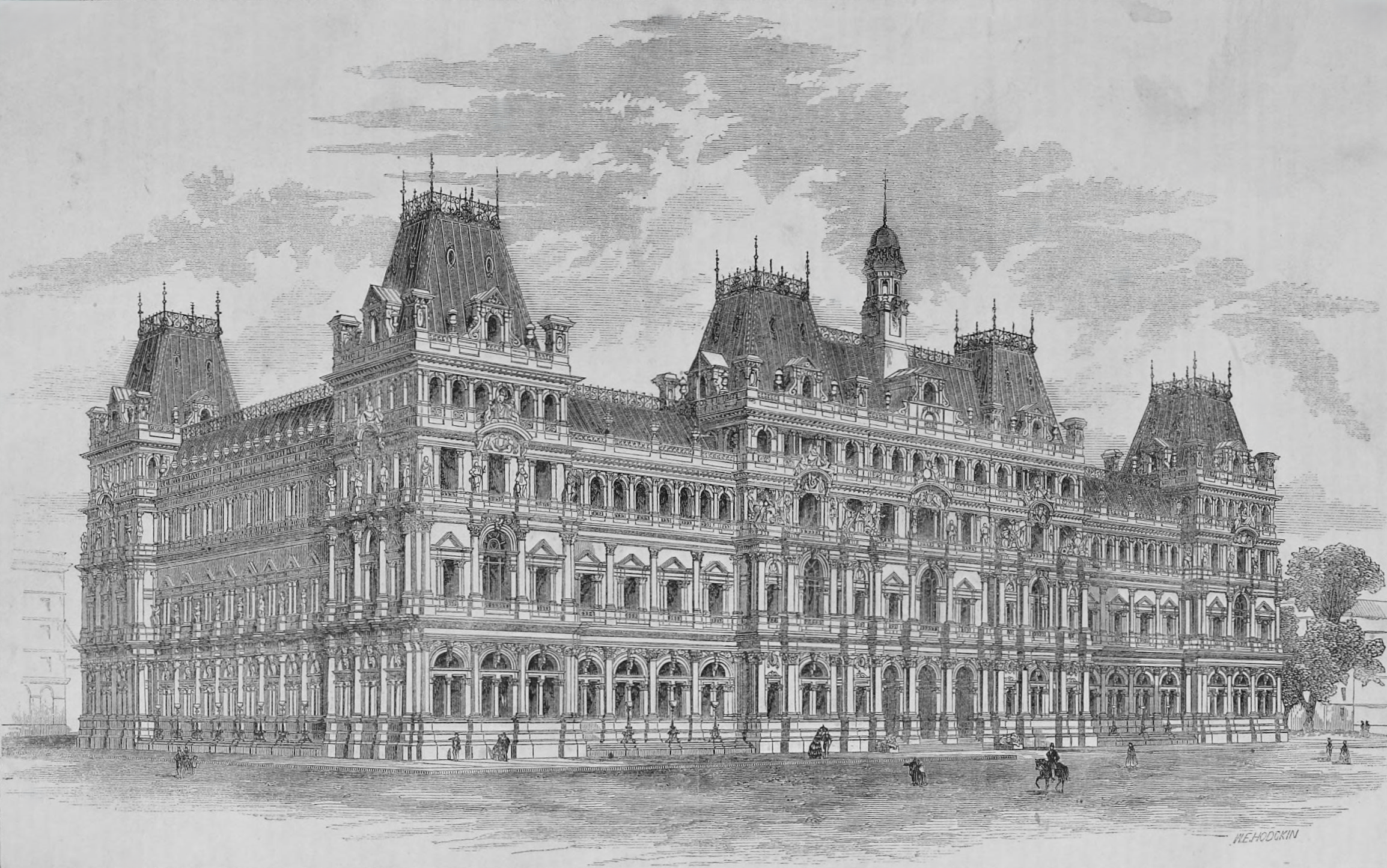
The proposed War Office of 1857, designed by Henry Bayly Garling. The building was unexecuted, and instead the department obtained Cumberland House for its use.

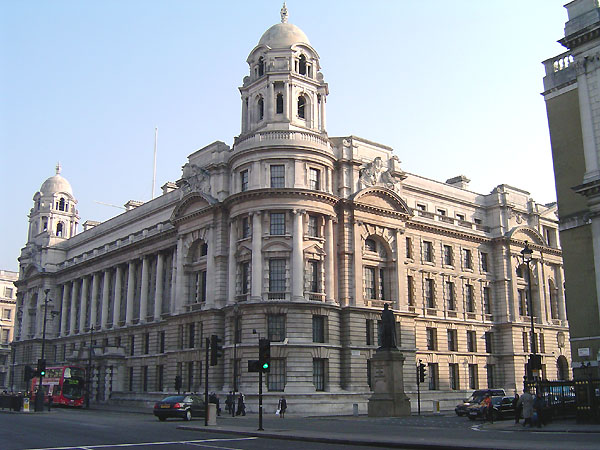
View of the former War Office building from Whitehall.

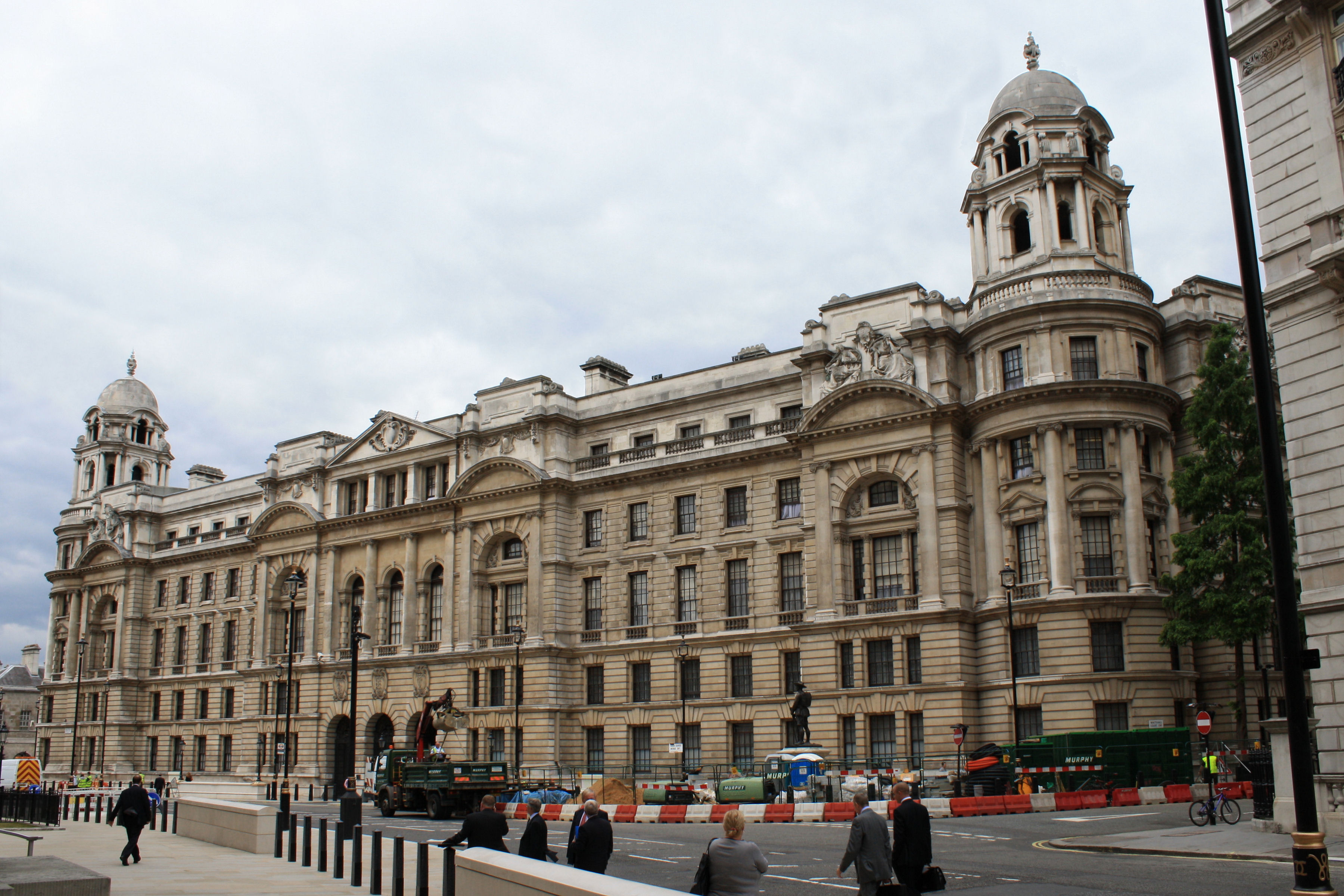
The former War Office building facing Horse Guards Avenue.

As early as 1718 letters from the Secretary at War were addressed from "The War Office". His department had several headquarters in London until it settled at Horse Guards in Whitehall during 1722. It remained there until 1858. Then, following the dissolution of the Board of Ordnance, the War Office moved into the Board's former offices in Cumberland House, Pall Mall. Over the ensuing years it expanded into adjacent properties on Pall Mall before it was relocated to purpose-built accommodation, in what is now known as the Old War Office Building, in 1906.

Between 1906 and its abolition in 1964 the War Office was based in a large neo-Baroque building designed by William Young, completed during 1906, and located on Horse Guards Avenue at its junction with Whitehall in central London. The construction of the building required five years to complete, at a cost of more than 1.2 million pounds. The building is somewhat oddly shaped, forming a trapezoid to maximise the use of the irregularly shaped plot of land on which it was built: its four distinctive domes were designed as a decorative means of disguising the shape. It has around 1,100 rooms on seven floors.

After 1964 the building continued to be used, under the name The Old War Office, by the Ministry of Defence.

On 1 June 2007 the building, other than the steps that give access to it, was designated as a protected site for the purposes of Section 128 of the Serious Organised Crime and Police Act 2005. The effect was to make it a specific criminal offence for a person to trespass on the building.

In August 2013 it was announced that the building would be sold on the open market, with a goal of realising offers above 100 million pounds. On 13 December 2014 the Ministry of Defence confirmed that the building would be sold to the Hinduja Group for an undisclosed amount. The building's sale was completed on 1 March 2016, for more than £350 million, on a 250-year lease, to the Hinduja Group (in partnership with OHL Developments) for conversion to a luxury hotel and residential apartments. The Hinduja Group and Raffles Hotels opened the hotel, named Raffles London at The OWO, in 2023.

== War Office departments ==
The War Office departments were as follows:

- Office of the Secretary of State
  - Military Secretary's Department (1870–1964)
- Department of the Parliamentary Under-Secretary for War
  - Directorate-General of Lands (?–1923)
  - Directorate of Lands (from 1923)
  - Directorate-General of the Territorial and Volunteer Forces (?–1921)
  - Directorate-General of the Territorial Army (from 1921)
- Central Department (Department of the Secretary)
  - Department of the Chaplain-General
  - Department of the Judge Advocate-General
  - Publicity Section/Information Section
- Department of the Financial and Parliamentary Secretary (Finance Department)
  - Directorate of Army Contracts (from 1924)
- Imperial General Staff
  - Directorate of Military Intelligence (?–1922)
  - Directorate of Military Operations (?–1922)
  - Directorate of Military Operations and Intelligence (from 1922)
  - Directorate of Military Training (from 1922)
  - Directorate of Army Staff Duties
- Department of the Adjutant-General
  - Directorate-General of Graves Registration and Enquiries (?–1921)
  - Directorate-General of Army Medical Services
  - Directorate of Mobilisation
  - Directorate of Organisation
  - Directorate of Army Personal Service
  - Directorate of Prisoners of War (?–1921)
  - Directorate of Recruiting and Organisation
- Department of the Quartermaster-General
  - Directorate of Equipment and Ordnance Stores (?–1927)
  - Directorate of Movements
  - Directorate of Quartering
  - Directorate of Remounts
  - Directorate of Supplies and Transport
  - Controller of Surplus Stores and Salvage
  - Surveyor-General of Supply (?–1921)
  - Directorate-General of Army Veterinary Services
  - Directorate of Works (from 1927)
- Department of the Master-General of the Ordnance
  - Directorate of Artillery
  - Directorate of Factories
  - Directorate of Fortifications and Works (?–1927)
  - Directorate of Ordnance Services (from 1927)
  - Chief Technical Examiner for Works Services
- Directorate of Military Aeronautics (1913–1918)

== James Bond films ==
The former War Office building served as the filming location for the MI6 headquarters (M's office) in five James Bond 007 movies. The landmark building appears in Octopussy (1983), A View to a Kill (1985), The Living Daylights (1986), Licence to Kill (1989), Skyfall (2012), and Spectre (2015).

== See also ==
- Directorate of Military Intelligence (United Kingdom)
- Secretary at War
- United States Department of War

== Sources ==
- Clark, Andrew (20 February 1904). "The Army Council and Military Medical Administration". The British Medical Journal. 1 (2251): 442. JSTOR 20279611.
- Faught, C. Brad (2016). Kitchener: Hero and Anti-Hero. London and New York, I.B. Tauris. ISBN 978-1784533502.
- https://Discovery.NationalArchives.gov.uk/details/r/C259pen-government-licence/version/3/ (Open Government Licence v3.0) Crown copyright
