= Somerset Bridge, Bermuda =

Drawbridge in Bermuda

Coordinates: 32°16.713′N 64°52.593′W

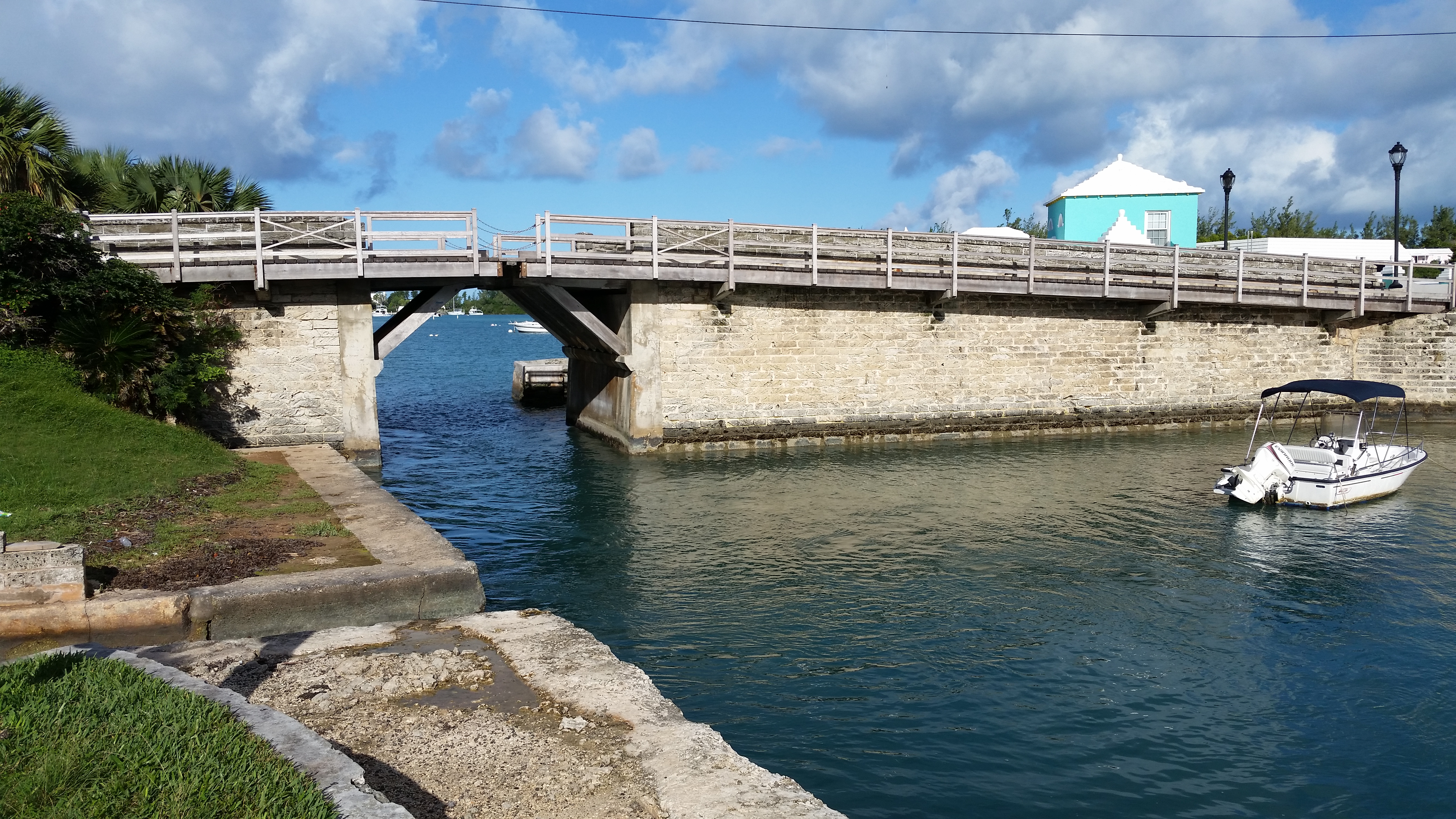
Somerset Drawbridge

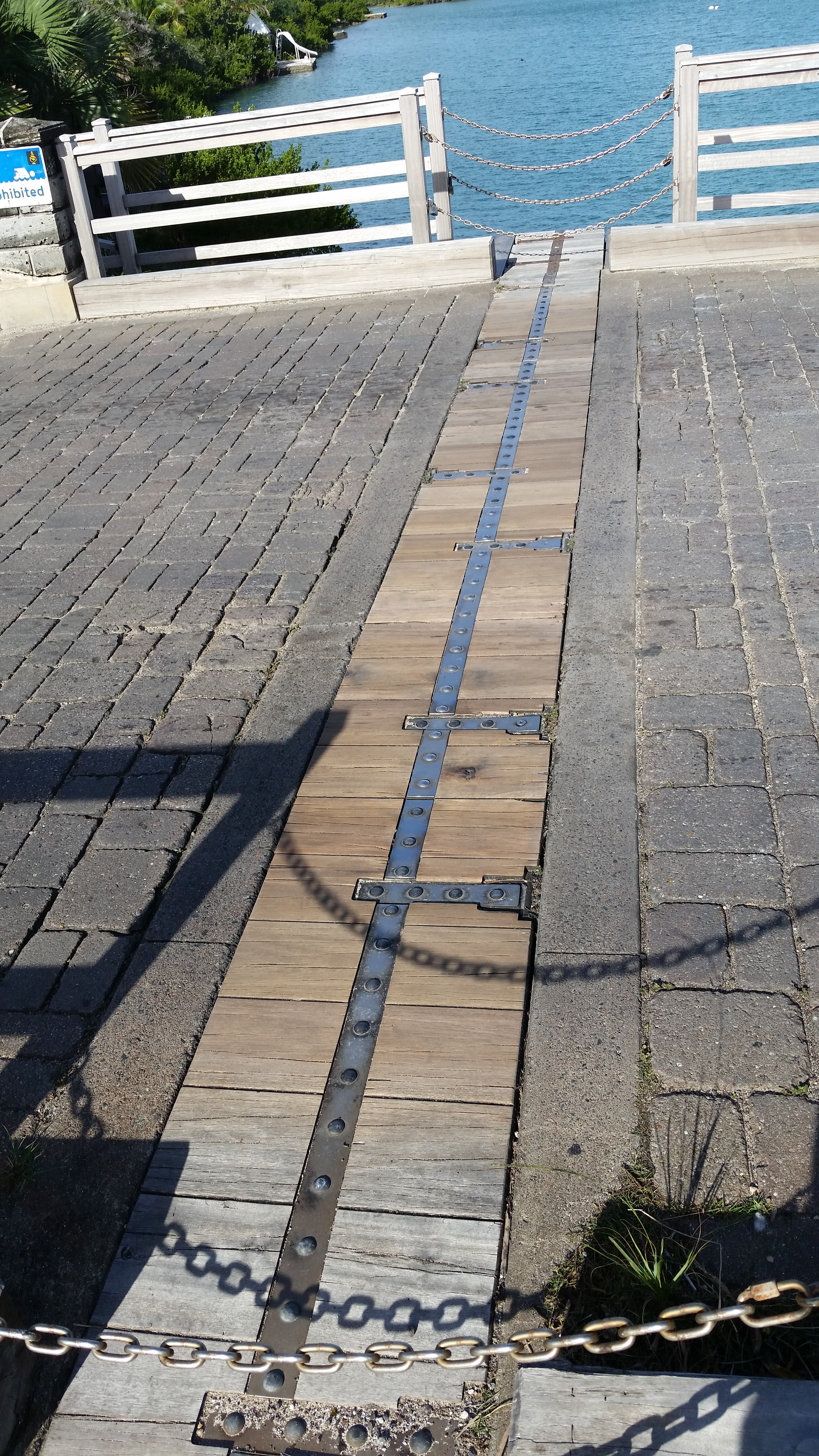
Somerset Drawbridge center with 32 inch bisected plank opened by hand to allow the passage of sailboat masts

Somerset Bridge is a small bridge in Bermuda connecting Somerset Island with the mainland in the western parish of Sandys, Somerset Bridge is reputedly the smallest working drawbridge in the world. It crosses a small channel connecting the Great Sound with Ely's Harbour.

The bridge is mentioned in the acts of Bermuda's first parliament, held in St. George's on 1 August 1620. Bridges were to be constructed at Somerset, the Flatts, and Coney Island. Additionally, the road from Somerset to Warwick was to be improved, and extended to Castle Point. The bridge appears on a 1624 map of Bermuda.

The bridge is opened by hand, creating a 32-inch gap that allows the passage of a sailboat's mast. The drawbridge is depicted on a Bermudian banknote.

== Somerset Bridge's design ==
One of the most remarkable aspects of Somerset Bridge is its design. Thought to be the smallest drawbridge in the world, Somerset Bridge features a 32-inch bisected plank that opens manually to allow the passage of sailboat masts. This simple yet ingenious mechanism has made Somerset Bridge a subject of fascination for visitors.

== Somerset Bridge on Bermuda's $20 Bill ==
Somerset Bridge, known for its ingenious design as the world's smallest drawbridge, is also featured on Bermuda's $20 bill, highlighting its cultural significance.
