= Edward Baily =

Edward Baily may refer to:

- Edward Baily (cricketer) (1852–1941), English cricketer
- Edward Hodges Baily (1788–1867), English sculptor
- Eddie Baily (1925–2010), English footballer

== See also ==
- Edward Bailey (disambiguation)
- Edward Bayley (disambiguation)
