= Edward Bayley =

Edward Bayley may refer to:

- Edward Hodson Bayley (1841–1938), British businessman and politician
- Edward Clive Bayley (1821–1884), Anglo-Indian civil servant, statesman and archæologist

== See also ==
- Edward Bailey (disambiguation)
- Edward Baily (disambiguation)
