= Edward Phillip Bailey =

Bermudian politician

Edward Phillip Bailey was a member of the Parliament of Bermuda for Sandys North.
