= Rogue Island, Bermuda =

Island in Bermuda

Coordinates: 32.364570°N 64.708426°W

Rogue Island is an island of Bermuda that is a nature reserve.
