= Somerset Island, Bermuda =

Island of Bermuda

Somerset Island

Geography
- Coordinates: 32°17′47″N 64°52′10″W
- Area: 2.84 km^{2} (1.10 sq mi)

Administration
- Bermuda
- Parish: Sandys Parish

Somerset Island is one of the main islands of the chain that makes up Bermuda. It lies in the far west of the territory, and covers 2.84 square kilometres (700 acres).

== Description ==
Somerset Island comprises about half of the parish of Sandys, and is the largest of a chain of islands which extends along the northwestern coast of the Great Sound. The village of Somerset lies in the northern part of the island, which is connected to Boaz Island in the northeast and the Bermudian mainland in the south by bridges (the latter of these being the historic Somerset Bridge).

== Geography ==
The coast of Somerset island includes several bays, notably Mangrove Bay in the northeast and the natural harbour, Ely's Harbour, in the southwest. Other features of the island include Daniel's Head, the island's westernmost point near Daniel's Island, and historic Scaur Hill Fort.
