= Watford Island, Bermuda =

Island of Bermuda

Coordinates: 32°18′N 64°51′W

Watford Island is an island of Bermuda, which has an area of 4 acres (1.6 ha) and is part of Sandys Parish.

Watford Island was part of the British Admiralty presence at the west end of Bermuda. Together with neighbouring Boaz Island it was developed in the 1840s as a prison to house convicts transported to Bermuda to labour on the construction of the Royal Naval Dockyard on Ireland Island and other Government works. Prior to this, convicts had been accommodated in unhealthy conditions aboard prison hulks. Clarence Barracks were built on Boaz Island. Watford Island held a hospital for the convicts, who had previously been treated at the Royal Naval Hospital on Ireland Island. This hospital building no longer survives, though a separate building used to isolate patients with contagious diseases (principally Yellow fever) still remains. A convict cemetery with over 400 burials was located on the island. After the last convicts were removed from Bermuda in the 1860s, Boaz and Watford Islands were transferred from the Admiralty to the War Department, which used them as a British Army base, replacing the bridge that had linked them with a man-made isthmus, effectively turning the two islands into one and the channel between into a camber. As the Bermuda Garrison was reduced after the First World War, Boaz and Watford Islands were transferred back to the Admiralty in the 1930s and re-developed as Royal Naval Air Station Bermuda. This was placed on a care-and-maintenance basis with the end of the war, and both islands were among the Admiralty and War Department lands that were transferred to the local government of the British Overseas Territory in the 1950s. The buildings became derelict, and many have since been demolished, though one on Watford was converted by the local Government to Police barracks in 1956 (no longer serving that function).
