= Hamilton Harbour, Bermuda =

Natural harbour in Bermuda

Coordinates: 32.289°N 64.784°W

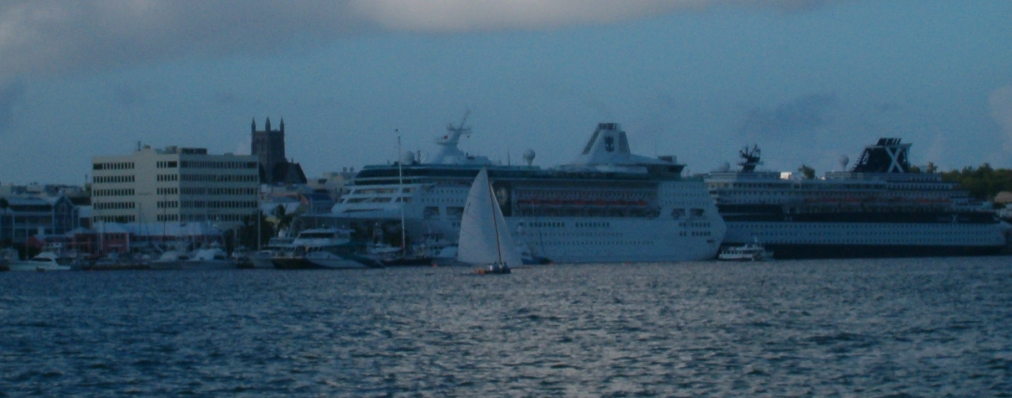
A Bermuda Fitted Dinghy, being put through its paces in Hamilton Harbour, Bermuda.

Hamilton Harbour is a natural harbour in Bermuda which serves as the port for the capital, the City of Hamilton. It is an arm of the Great Sound, and forms a tapering wedge shape of water between Paget Parish and the peninsula which forms Pembroke Parish, and upon which the capital sits.

The approaches to the harbour are protected by a chain of islands (notably Hinson's, Marshall's, Long, and Hawkins), and by the small Salt Kettle Peninsula. Another island sits inside the harbour itself, White's Island. The eastern end of the harbour, the narrow corner of an isosceles triangle, is a small mangrove grown bay used for mooring smaller pleasure boats.

== History ==
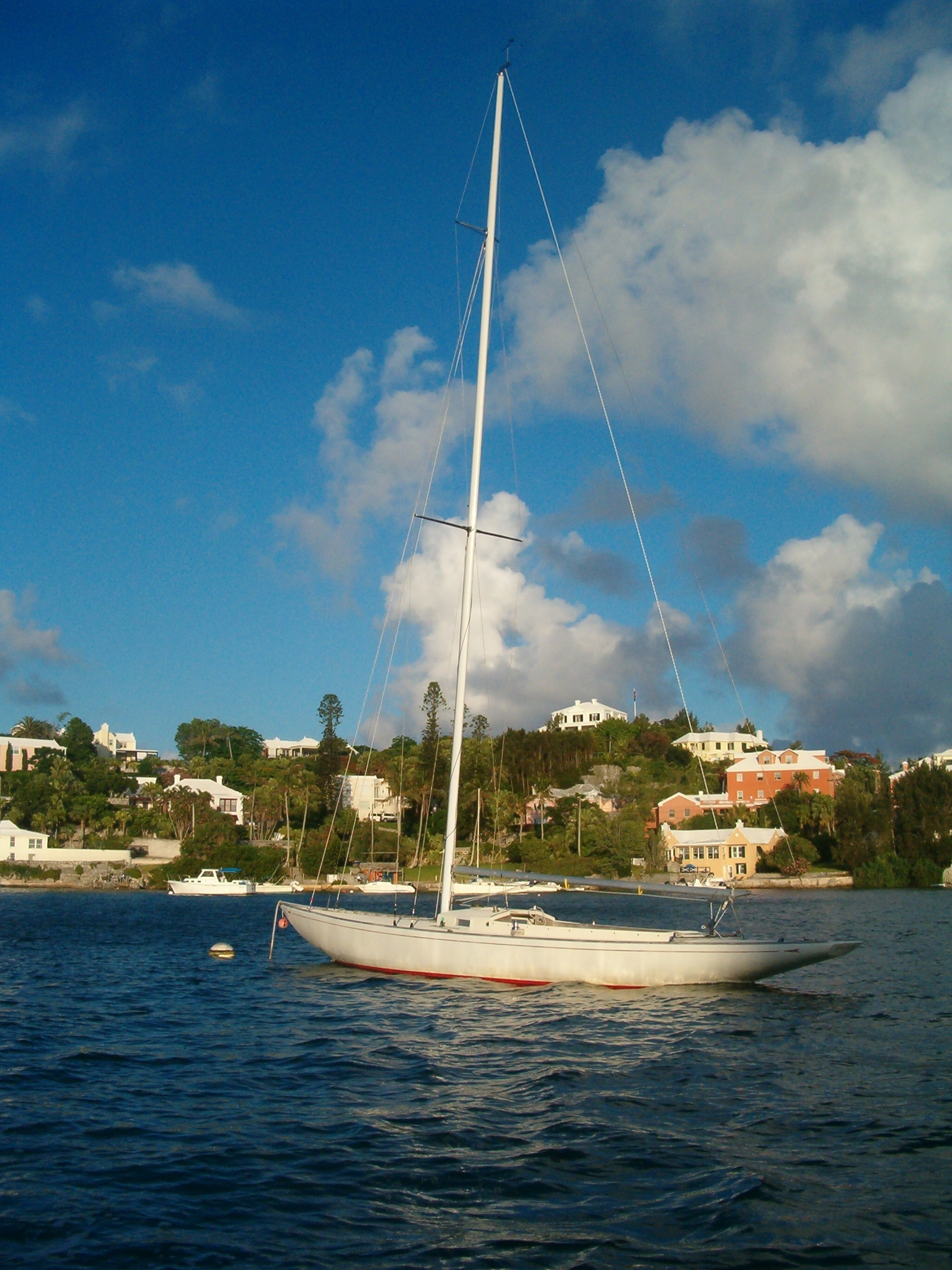
The Paget shoreline on the southern side of Hamilton Harbour.

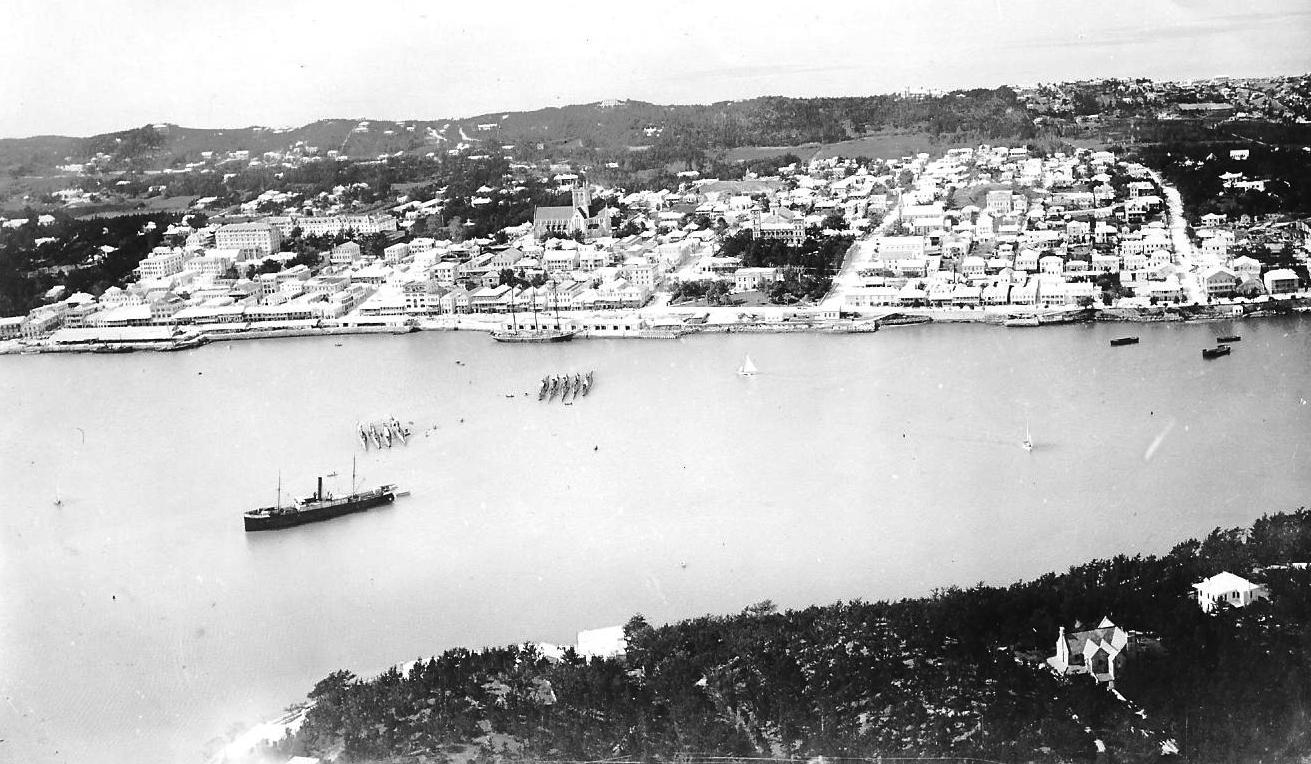
Aerial view of Hamilton Harbour in 1926

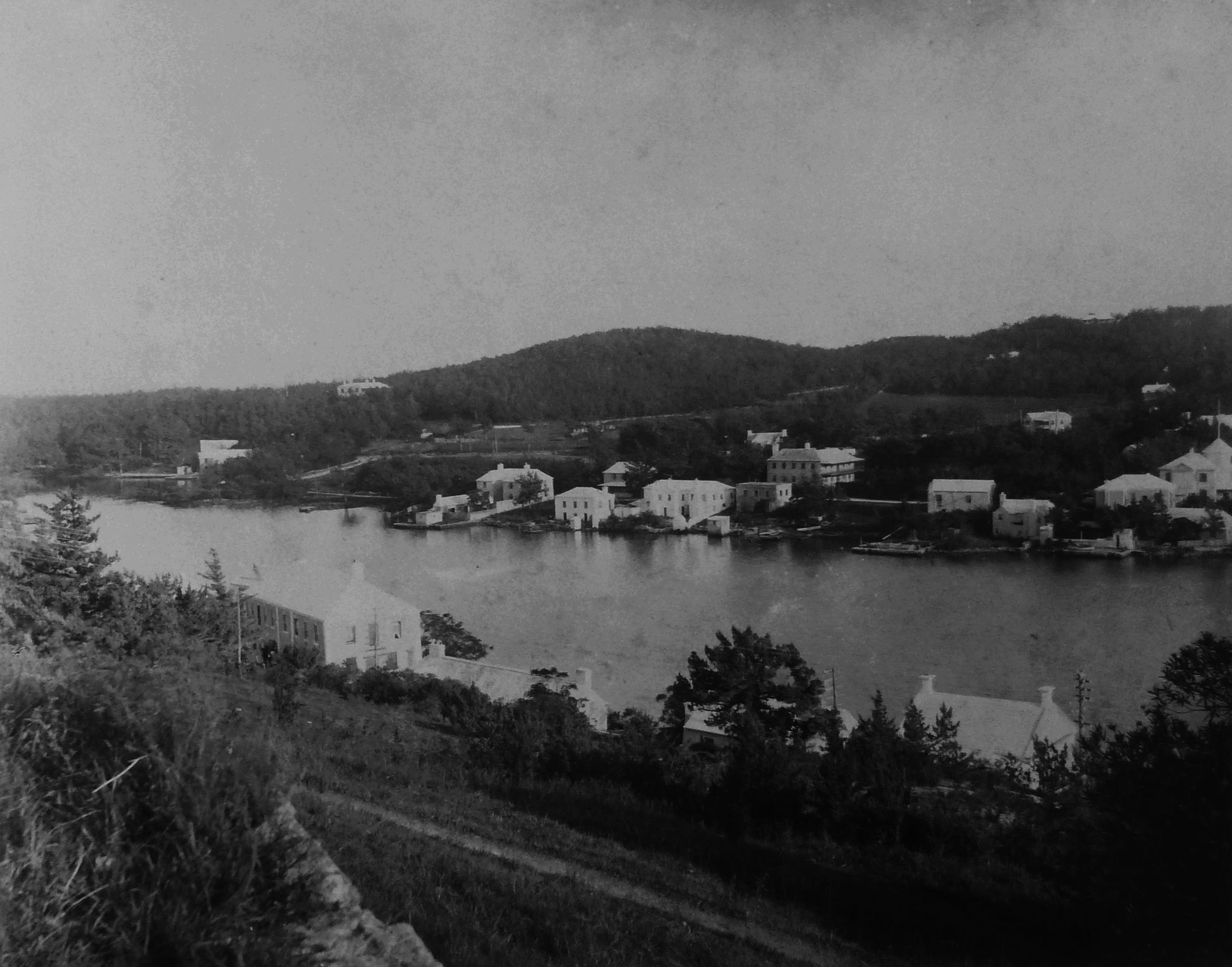
1904 view across Hamilton Harbour from Fort Hamilton towards Paget Parish

The name Hamilton Harbour is taken from the City of Hamilton, itself named for the Governor of Bermuda at the time of its 1793 founding, Sir Henry Hamilton. Prior to this, the harbour was known as Paget's Port, taking its name from the parish of Paget to its south (the parish having been named for William Paget, 4th Baron Paget de Beaudesert).

Although superior in many ways to St. George's Harbour at the east of the archipelago, no easy route of access to Hamilton Harbour for large vessels from the open ocean through the reefline which surrounded Bermuda was known until the narrows was located by a Royal Naval hydrographer, Thomas Hurd, who spent twelve years charting Bermuda's reefs following US independence. The reason for the Royal Navy's effort was its development of Bermuda as a major naval base, to replace the bases lost along the US Atlantic Seaboard when those colonies seceded. Although it initially began operating out of Convict Bay in St. George's Harbour, the Navy began buying up land at the West End of Bermuda with a view to establishing what would become the Royal Naval Dockyard. It also bought up most of the smaller islands in the Great Sound, including those in Hamilton Harbour. Its plans for the development of the base were stymied, however, until it could discover a route by which its warships could reach the Great Sound. When it discovered this, allowing naval operations to begin to be transferred to the West End, it also opened the Great Sound and Hamilton Harbour for access by merchant shipping, accelerating the development of the port of Hamilton, and of the central parishes, to the point that by 1815 Hamilton was clearly a more important town than St. George's, and the capital of Bermuda was relocated there.

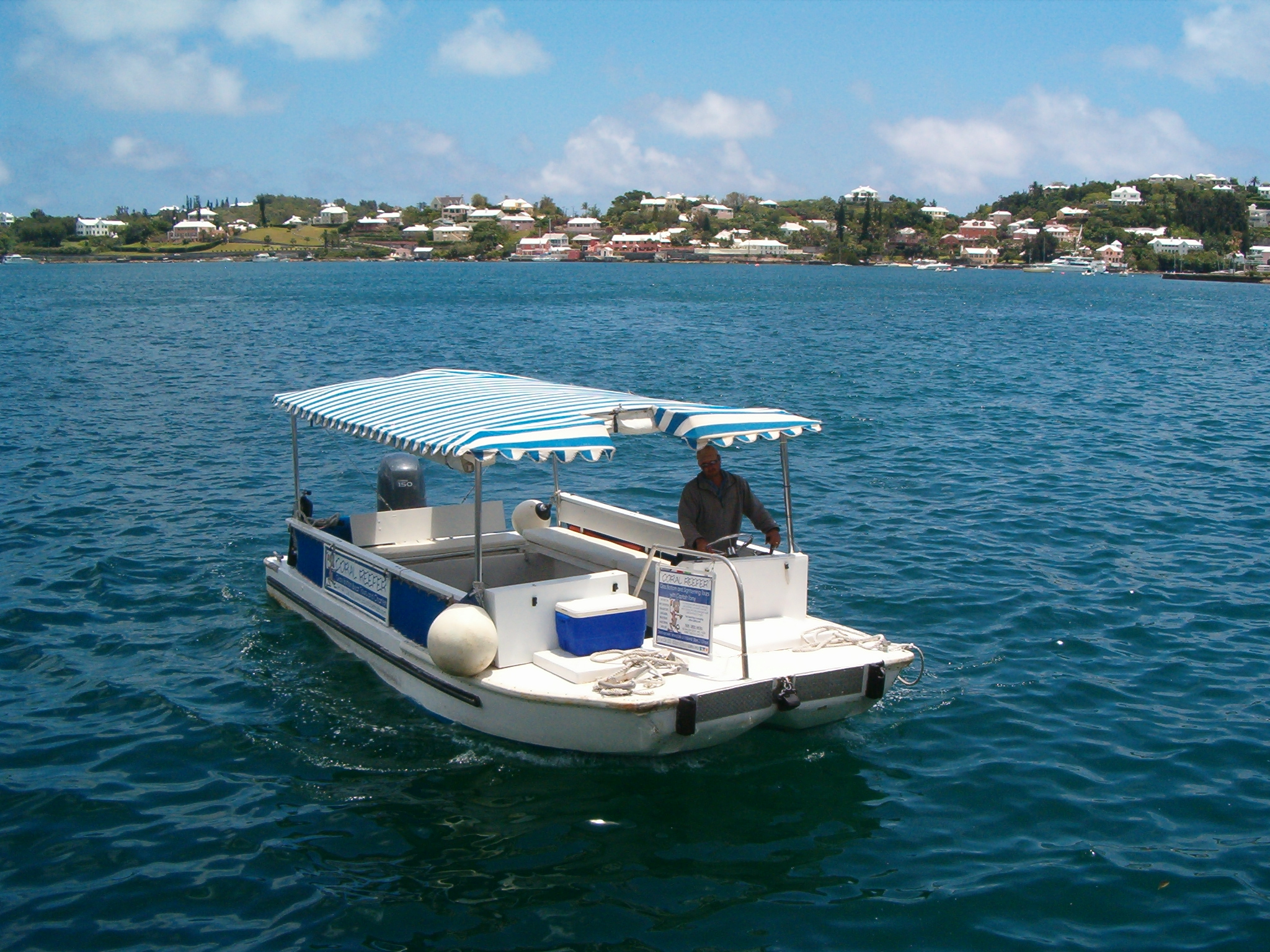
Hamilton Harbour, looking south-eastward from Hamilton towards Paget.

Hamilton has remained Bermuda's primary port ever since. Despite dredging of the narrow channels into St. George's Harbour, the largest merchant vessels which visit the island are unable to enter it (many cruise ship operators have preferred in recent decades not to enter it, as Hamilton was seen as a more lucrative destination). The port of Hamilton includes Bermuda's primary freight docks and cruise ship docks along Front Street in Hamilton, as well as yacht marinas in Hamilton, Pembroke, and Paget. Although very large vessels, such as the ships delivering cars and other motor vehicles from factories in Asia, call at Hamilton, recent years have seen an increase in the size of the cruise ships which visit Bermuda to the point that none can fit through the channel into Hamilton Harbour (in past, only the very largest ocean liners, like the QE2 and the Canberra, were unable to enter, being forced to use an anchorage beyond the Great Sound). Today, most cruise ships must moor at the former Royal Naval Dockyard, their passengers using tenders and ferries to reach Hamilton. Despite the suggestion of removing White's Island in order to widen the accessway into Hamilton Harbour, current plans of the Corporation of Hamilton (the municipal government of the City of Hamilton), call for the redevelopment of its docklands for other uses. Even the freight docks may be relocated, though the Corporation of Hamilton earns considerable revenue from them. Even as the commercial applications of the port of Hamilton have dwindled, the use of the harbour for marinas and pleasure craft has increased in recent years, with both the Royal Hamilton Amateur Dinghy Club and the Royal Bermuda Yacht Club having greatly expanded their marinas, and with a new, commercially-operated marina having been developed on Pitt's Bay Road.
