= Southampton Parish, Bermuda =

Parish of Bermuda

Coordinates: 32°15′00″N 64°51′00″W

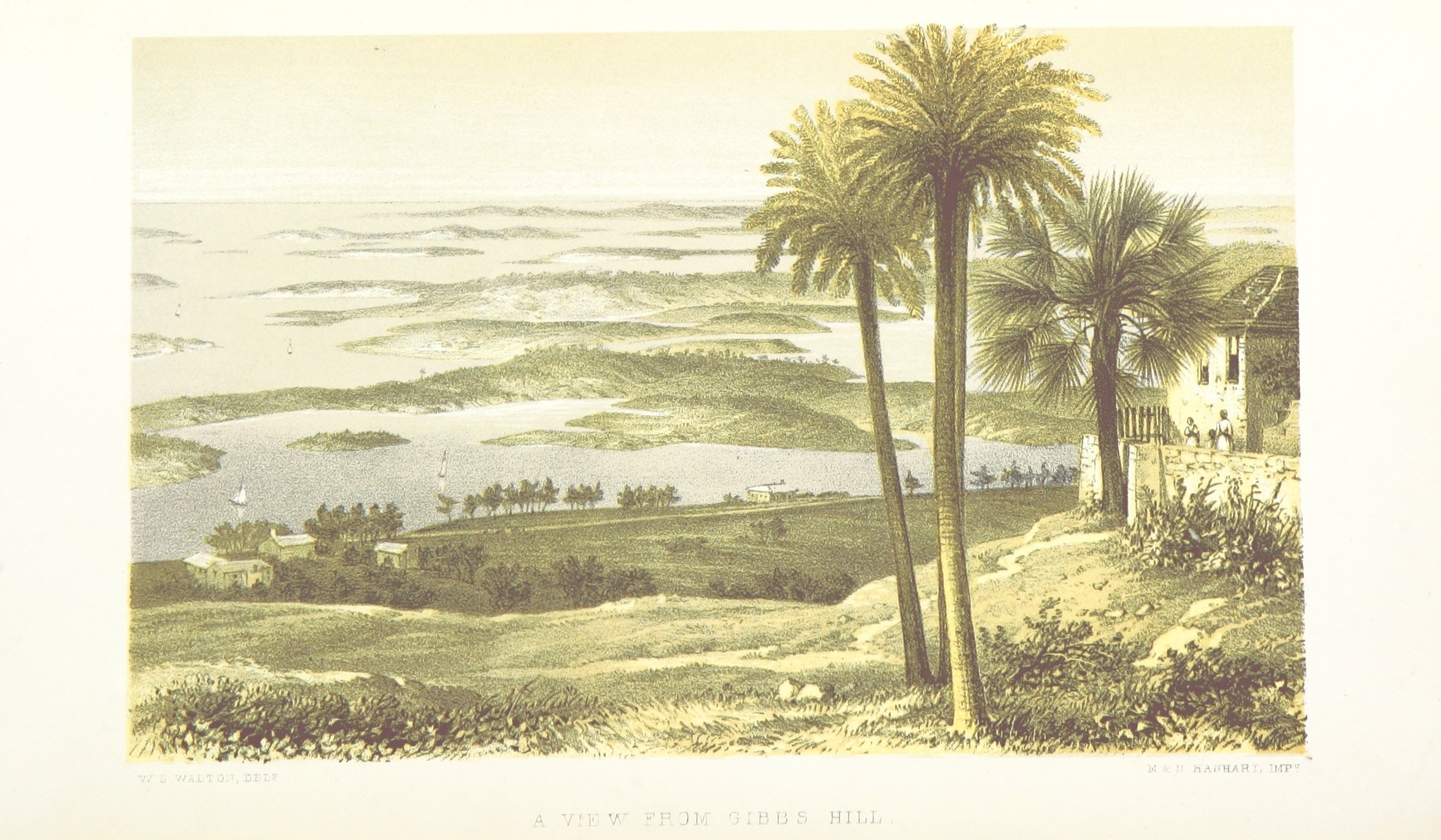
A view from Gibbs Hill, 1857

Southampton Parish is one of the nine parishes of Bermuda. It is named for Henry Wriothesley, 3rd Earl of Southampton (1573-1624).

It is located in the southwest of the island chain, occupying all of the western part of the main island, except for the westernmost tip (which is part of Sandys Parish). It includes the chain's southernmost point, and its north coast comprises much of the coast of the Little Sound (an arm of the Great Sound, the large expanse of water which dominates the geography of western Bermuda). in the east it is joined to Warwick Parish. As with most of Bermuda's parishes, it covers just over 2.3 square miles (about 6.0 km^{2} or 1500 acres). It had a population of 6,421 in 2016.

Natural features in Southampton include Church Bay, Horseshoe Bay, Riddell's Bay, Turtle Bay, and Whale Bay,

Other notable features of Southampton include the Whale Bay Fort, and Gibbs Hill Lighthouse, which stands on the chain's highest point.

== Education ==
Schools in the parish:

- Southampton Preschool
- Heron Bay Primary School
- Port Royal Primary School
- Dalton E. Tucker Primary School
- Bermuda Institute (private school)

Hotels The Reefs Resort and Club

== Sports ==
Southampton Rangers football club play their home games at the Southampton Oval.
