= RNAS Bermuda =

Former Royal Naval Air Station and flying boat base in Bermuda

RNAS Bermuda or Boaz Island (HMS Malabar)

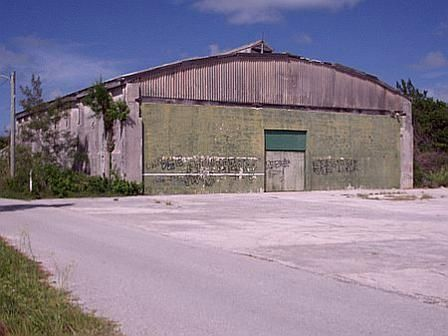
- The surviving hangar at the Fleet Air Arm's Royal Naval Air Station on Boaz Island

Site information
- Type: Royal Naval Air Station
- Owner: Admiralty
- Operator: Royal Navy

Location
- Shown within Bermuda
- Coordinates: 32°19′16″N 064°50′25″W

Site history
- Built: 1940
- In use: 1940-1946

Garrison information
- Garrison: America and West Indies Station

Royal Naval Air Station Bermuda (the personnel of which, as with all members of the America and West Indies Station shore establishment in the Imperial fortress colony of Bermuda at the time, were part of the strength of the stone frigate HMS Malabar) was a Royal Naval Air Station in the Royal Naval Dockyard on Ireland Island until 1939, then Boaz Island (and also the conjoined Watford Island), Bermuda. Bermuda became the primary base for the North America and West Indies Station of the Royal Navy in the North-West Atlantic following American independence. It was the location of a dockyard, an Admiralty House, and the base of a naval squadron.

== History ==
In the 20th century, when aeroplanes were added to the naval arsenal, large warships carried seaplanes and flying boats for use in reconnaissance, directing the ship's artillery fire, and for carrying out offensive actions on their own. These aeroplanes were generally carried on, and launched from catapults, and retrieved by crane after landing on the water. Unlike aircraft carriers, the cruisers and capital ships which carried these floatplanes had very limited abilities to maintain their aeroplanes, or to protect them from the elements.

=== Fleet Air Arm ===
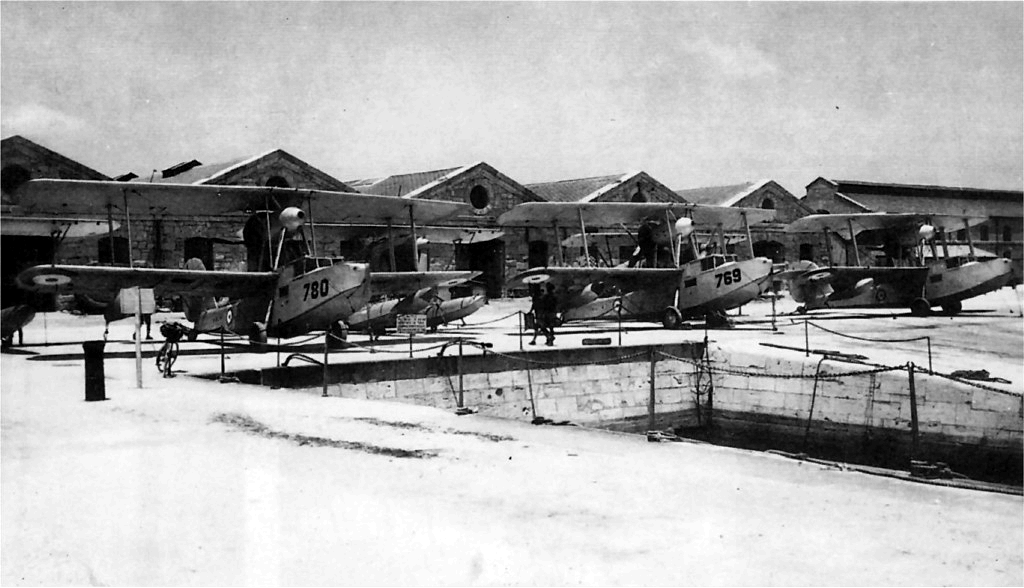
Walrus and Seafox seaplanes at RNAS Bermuda, at the original Royal Air Force-operated location in the North Yard of HM Dockyard Bermuda, in 1938

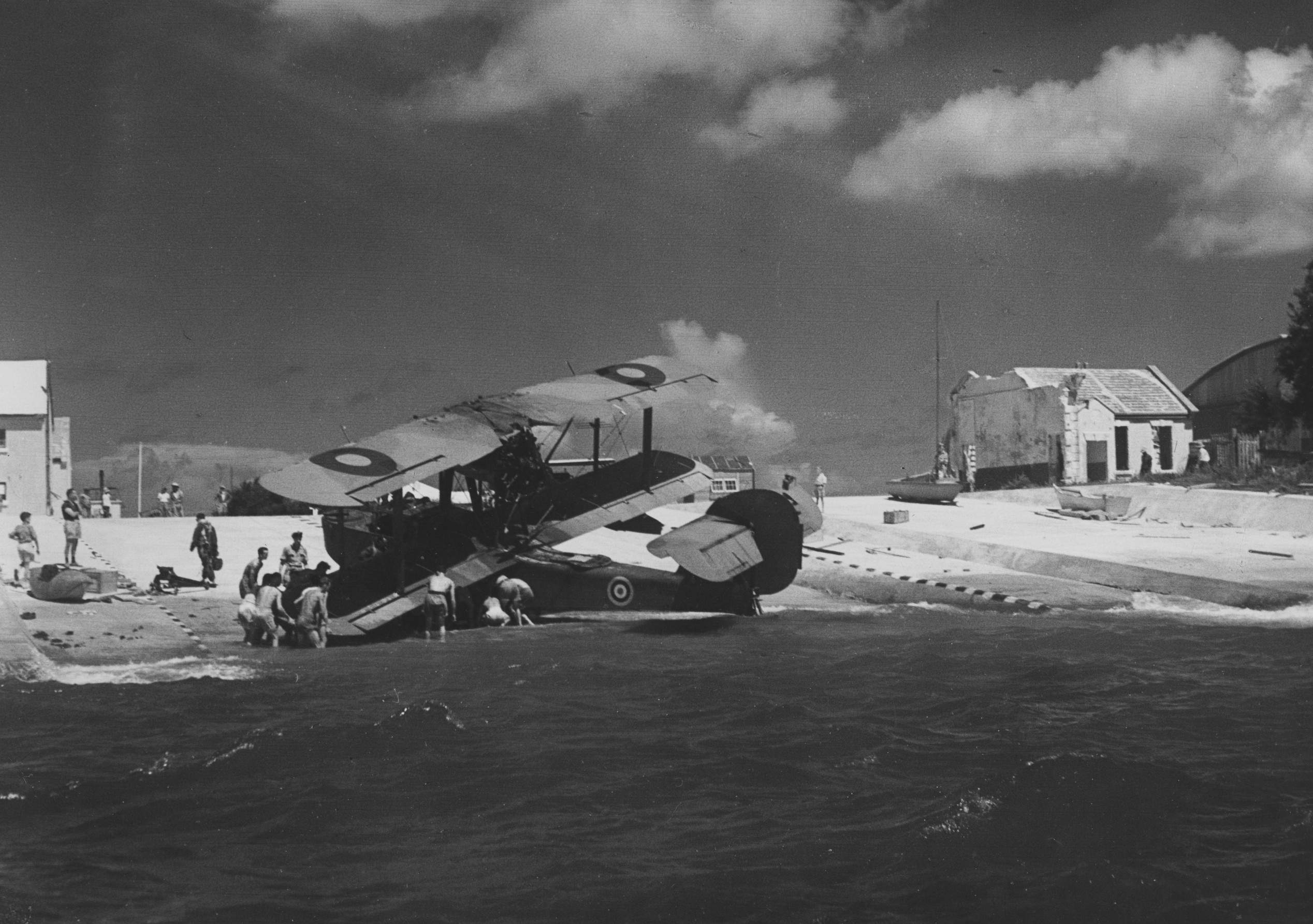
Supermarine Walrus at Royal Naval Air Station Bermuda at Boaz Island

Between World War I and World War II, the Royal Air Force (RAF) had assumed responsibility for operating the Royal Navy's Fleet Air Arm (FAA). From 1933, an RAF Coastal Command detachment at the HM Dockyard, on Ireland Island, was responsible for the maintenance of the aeroplanes carried by the cruisers based at Bermuda, which belonged to the Fleet Air Arm's No. 443 Fleet Spotter-Reconnaissance Flight (which was administered by RAF Coastal Command), starting with HMS Norfolk. Flight Lieutenant Thomas H. Moon was appointed for duty with R.A.F. Detachment Bermuda with effect from 23rd of January, 1934.

This detachment, which originally operated on the dockside within the Dockyard, also held aeroplanes in store, crated in parts. When an aeroplane could not be repaired, another was assembled as a replacement.

=== Move to Boaz Island ===
In 1936 it was decided to move the FAA operation outside of the yard, and to build a dedicated air station. The under-used Boaz Island, to the south of Ireland Island, was selected. The Island was covered with tarmac areas, two hangars, workshops and living quarters. As no landplanes were handled, there was no need for a runway. Seaplanes and flying-boats were brought ashore via two slips and in July 1936 718 (Catapult) Flight was formed equipped with Fairey 111 and Osprey aircraft. The Royal Naval Air Station was completed in 1939 and commissioned as HMS Malabar II, the year the Second World War began. The decision had by then been made that the Royal Navy would resume responsibility for its own air-arm. Although RAF personnel would continue to make up the shortfalls in the FAA's naval manpower, Boaz Island would be operated as a completely naval facility. The responsibility of the station remained the maintenance and storage of aeroplanes. The transfer took place on 24 May 1939 and 718 Flight became 718 Squadron now equipped with Supermarine Walrus amphibians and Fairey Seafox seaplanes in support of the six ships of the 8th Cruiser Squadron. On 21 January 1940, all the catapult units worldwide were combined into 700 Squadron and soon afterwards Malabar II was decommissioned and now operated as part of the main base HMS MALABAR (a stone frigate to which the Royal Naval shore establishment in Bermuda (but not the crews of ships on the station) belonged to administratively). As the waters around Bermuda became a working-up area for US Navy and Royal Canadian Navy, as well as lend-lease ex-US Navy vessels of the Royal Navy, vessels preparing to join the Battle of the Atlantic, Fleet Air Arm target tugs were based at Boaz Island to assist in training anti-aircraft gunners afloat or ashore. 773 Fleet Requirements Unit was formed at Bermuda on the 3 June 1940, equipped with Blackburn Roc target tugs. These were normally meant to operate from carrier decks, and had retractable undercarriage. To operate from RNAS Bermuda, they were fitted with floats. They towed targets for anti-aircraft gunnery practice by Allied vessels working-up at Bermuda (this included US Navy and lend-lease ex-US Navy vessels commissioned into the Royal Navy and Royal Canadian Navy), as well as by a United States Navy anti-aircraft gunnery training centre operating on shore at Warwick Parish for the duration of the war. When the United States Army's Kindley Field became operational in 1943, the floats were removed from the Rocs, which thenceforth operated from the British end of the airfield as landplanes, being the first aircraft based there. 773 Fleet Requirements Unit disbanded on 25 April 1944.

=== Royal Air Force flying boat station ===
Although the Royal Air Force handed off RNAS Bermuda to the Royal Navy in 1939, the civil flying boat station at Darrell's Island, was taken over by RAF establishment in Bermuda for use by the Royal Air Force's own flying boats operated by Transport Command and Ferry Command during the War. The pre-war civil operator, Imperial Airways/BOAC, as a government airline, was put to war-service. The Bermuda Flying School, also operating from Darrell's, was created to train pilots for the RAF in 1940. The United States Navy would also begin its air operations from Bermuda with Vought Kingfishers based at Darrell's Island pending completion of the United States Naval Operating Base Bermuda.

=== Air patrols ===
Despite the presence of these two air stations, during the first years of the War there was no unit in Bermuda tasked with flying air patrols. Air cover became an immediate requirement as the Colony resumed its Great War role as a staging area for the formation of trans-Atlantic convoys. Air patrols were vital to combating the threat of German U-boats, and the FAA station at Boaz Island, making use of the large store of aeroplanes and munitions on hand, began operating its own air patrols, using whatever aircrew it had on hand. These included Naval pilots from ships in port, and RAF and Bermuda Flying School pilots from Darrell's Island.

Once the USA entered the war, the US Navy began operating anti-submarine air patrols from RAF Darrell's Island, then from its own base, USNOB Bermuda, in the West End (the United States Army built Kindley Field at the same time, at the East End), and the FAA station ceased its own air patrol. Its normal operations ceased, too, when it was placed on a 'care and maintenance' footing in 1944. By now catapult aircraft had in the main been retired.

== Closure ==
The station never re-opened, and Boaz and Watford Islands were part of the land disposed of by the Admiralty in 1957, following the reduction of the Dockyard to a base in 1951. The slipways and the northern hangar are still extant as at 2020.
