= White's Island =

Island in Paget, Bermuda

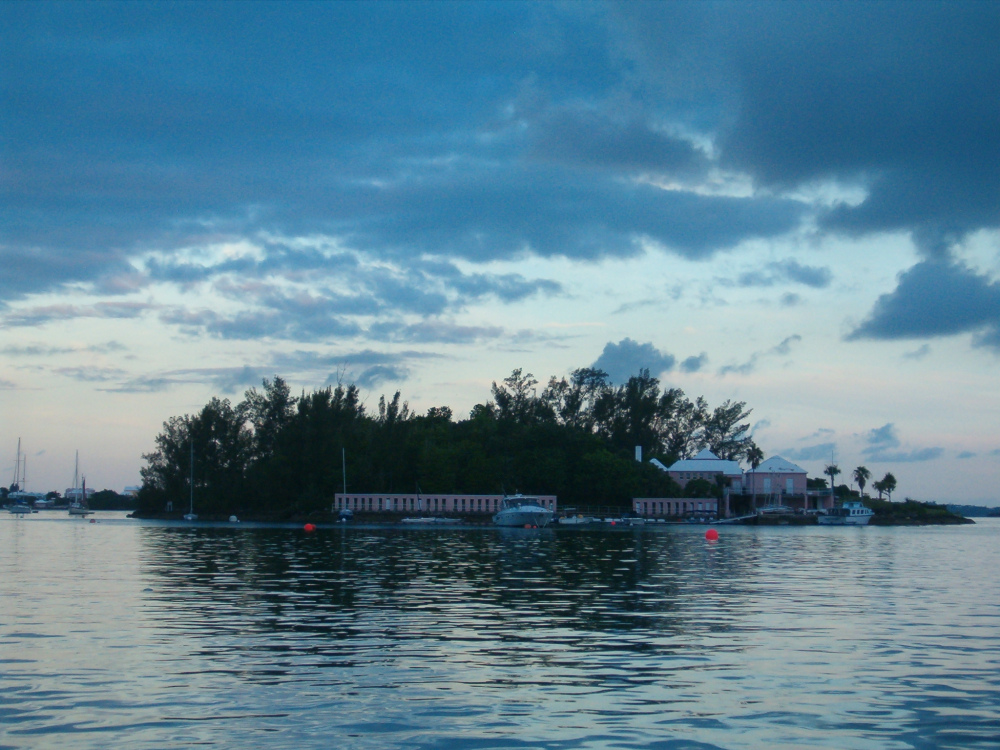
- White's Island in 2006

- Location of White's Island in Bermuda

Geography
- Location: Hamilton Harbour
- Coordinates: 32.2881°N 64.7847°W

Administration
- Bermuda

White's Island is an island located in Hamilton Harbour in Hamilton, Bermuda, the only island directly adjoined on all sides by the harbour.

== History ==
The island was originally known as Hunt's Island. Following US independence, the Royal Navy, deprived of its continental bases between Nova Scotia and the West Indies, established the Royal Naval Dockyard on Ireland Island. In addition to Ireland, Boaz, and Watford islands at the West of the Great Sound, the Admiralty purchased most of the small islands in the Great Sound and Hamilton Harbour. Over the following century, the Royal Navy and the British Army found various uses of these smaller islands.

=== US Naval use ===
White's Island served as a United States Navy base (Number 24) during the closing years of the First World War, being used as a staging point for anti-submarine vessels deploying to the European theatre of operations during their trans-Atlantic crossings.

== Controversies ==
White's Island currently belongs to the Bermuda Government, assigned to its Department of Youth, Sport and Recreation, which has permitted its use for many years by youth charities. The Bermuda Sailing Association (BSA) had an informal lease, which it lost on September 28, 2010, when a minister of the Progressive Labour Party government granted a 21-year lease to a new charity, CARTEL (Challenging and Reclaiming the True Essence of Life), for use in its youth rehabilitation programme. The government of Bermuda closed the Training School, its last facility for juvenile delinquents (a youth prison that had been located on Paget Island, Bermuda, in St. George's Harbour), two decades before. Leases of government land for twenty-one years or longer require parliamentary approval. The PLP government avoided this by granting a lease for one day short of twenty-one years. The BSA was forced to relocate its youth sailing programme to Darrell's Island. The Bermuda Amateur Swimming Association (BASA), which had also long had free use of White's Island for its own youth programme, was advised it would have to pay CARTEL $10 per child per week for its continued use of the island. The Bermuda Rowing Association was permitted to continue its use of the island for its youth programme at no charge. The granting of a lease to CARTEL, which is controlled by PLP party officers, is tied to wider accusations of the misappropriation of government revenues and assets by the PLP, which was defeated in the parliamentary election of 2012.

The association typically welcomes 80 to 120 children a week to the camp, meaning it could have to pay CARTEL as much as $7,200 before the end of the summer.

In 2013, the Corporation of the City of Hamilton revealed its controversial redevelopment plans for the Hamilton waterfront, which include a casino hotel on White's. As gambling is illegal in Bermuda, and a promised referendum on its legalisation has not yet been held, critics have questioned why the corporation and the private company with which it has partnered are already planning a casino.

== See also ==
- Hamilton Harbour
- Hamilton, Bermuda
- Paget, Bermuda
- United States Naval Station White's Island, Bermuda
