= Boaz Island, Bermuda =

Island of Bermuda

Boaz Island
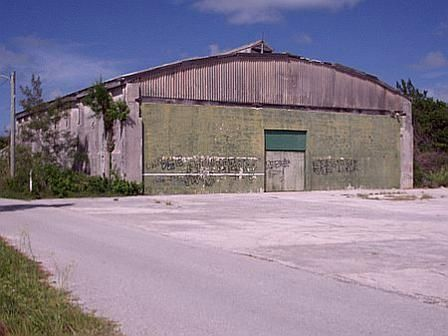
- Hangar at RNAS Bermuda on Boaz Island

- Map of Bermuda showing Boaz Island in red

Geography
- Coordinates: 32°18′22″N 64°51′23″W

Administration
- Bermuda
- Parish: Sandys Parish

Boaz Island, formerly known as Gate's Island or Yates Island, is one of the six main islands of Bermuda. It is part of a chain of islands in the west of the country that make up Sandys Parish, lying between the larger Ireland Island and Watford Island, with which it has been joined by a man-made isthmus. South of Watford Island is Somerset Island.

Boaz and Watford are connected to Somerset by Watford Bridge, and to Ireland by Gray's Bridge. Watford's east coast forms part of the edge of the Great Sound. The western end of the channel between Boaz and Watford was blocked by the isthmus, creating a camber that opens to the Great Sound.

Boaz and Watford Islands were parts of the Royal Naval base, which included the HM Dockyard on Ireland Island.

Constructed in the mid-19th century, the Clarence Barracks on Boaz Island housed convict laborers who had previously lived aboard prison hulks, while a hospital and related facilities were established on neighboring Watford Island. After the withdrawal of the Convict Establishment in the 1860s, both islands were transferred to the British Army, and the bridge connecting them was replaced with a man-made isthmus.

With the reduction of the Bermuda Garrison after the First World War, both islands were returned to the Royal Navy in the 1930s. From 1939, Boaz Island and Watford Island were used as Royal Naval Air Station Bermuda (which had previously been located in the North Yard on Ireland Island). The primary role of the air station was the servicing, repair and replacement of spotter floatplanes and flying boats belonging to naval vessels. Early in the Second World War, with no other units to fill the role, aeroplanes from Boaz Island were used to maintain anti-submarine air patrols, using whatever aircrew were on hand, including pilots from the Bermuda Flying School on Darrell's Island. Subsequently, target tugs were based at the air station to service the Allied naval vessels working-up on Bermuda's waters.

The air station was placed on a care and maintenance footing after the war and both islands were among the former Admiralty and War Office lands transferred to the local government in the 1950s. All that remains of the Fleet Air Arm facility today is a hangar on runway road, and two slips.
