= Sandys Parish =

Parish of Bermuda

Coordinates: 32°18′00″N 64°52′00″W

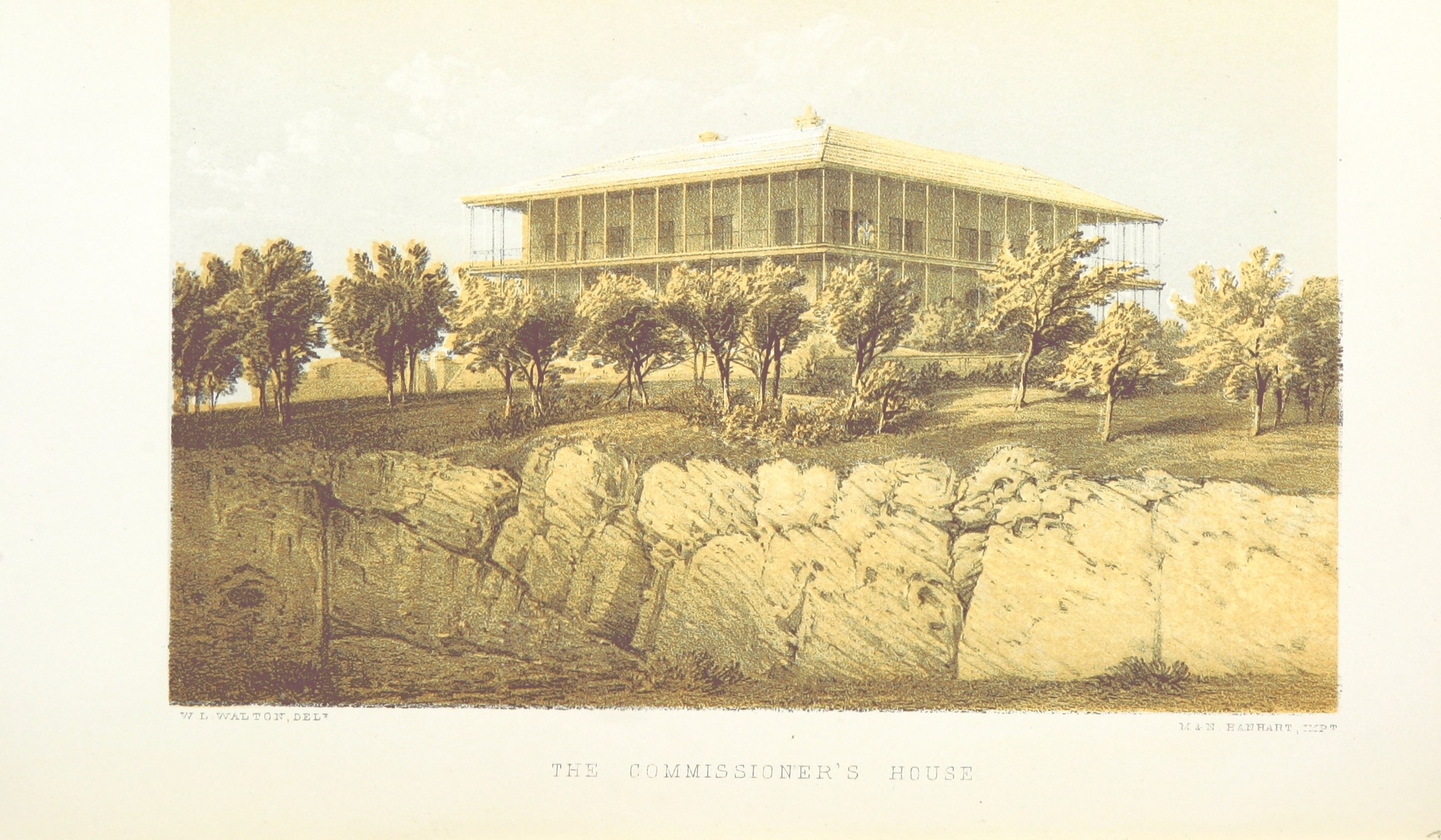
Commissioner's House on Ireland Island, 1857

Sandys Parish (/sændz/ "sands") is one of the nine parishes of Bermuda. It is named for English aristocrat Sir Edwin Sandys.

It is located in the south west of the island chain, occupying the three islands of Ireland Island, Boaz Island, and the larger Somerset Island, as well as a small part of the main island of Bermuda. These islands make up the western coast of the Great Sound, the large expanse of water which dominates the geography of western Bermuda, where it is joined to Southampton parish. Like most other parishes in Bermuda, it covers 2.3 square miles (about 6.0 km^{2} or 1500 acres). It had a population of 6,983 in 2016.

Natural features in Sandys include Ely's Harbor, the Cathedral Rocks, Daniel's Head, and Mangrove Bay.

Other notable features of Sandys include the Somerset Bridge, which links the mainland to Somerset Island, and the old Royal Naval Dockyard on Ireland Island.

== Education ==
Schools in the Parish:

- Lagoon Park Preschool
- Somerset Primary School
- West End Primary School
- Sandys Middle School

== Notable people ==
- Kim Wilson, Minister for Health
- Edward Philip Bailey, former member of Parliament
