= Administrative divisions of Bermuda =

The land area of Bermuda is divided into nine parishes. There are also two defined municipalities, located in the boundaries of two of the parishes.

== Parishes ==
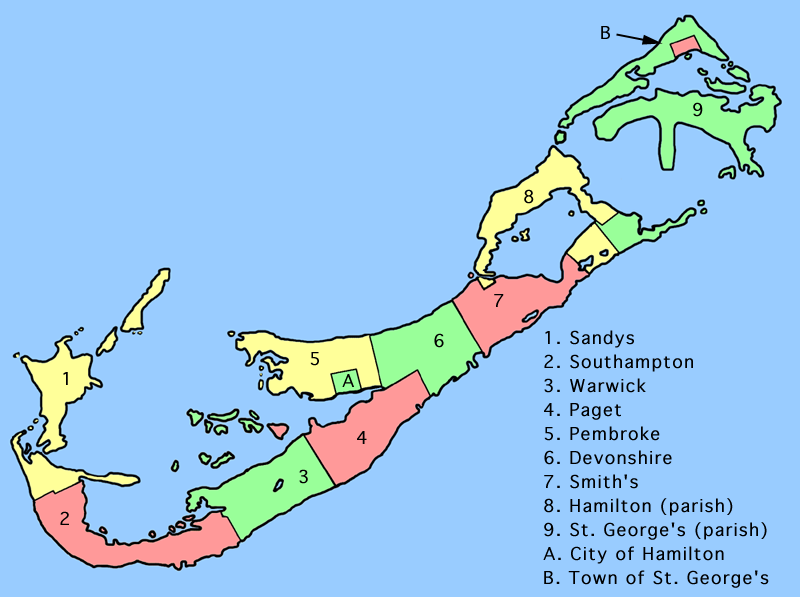

Bermuda has nine "Parishes", originally called "Tribes". Each of the nine parishes with the exception of St. George's covers the same land area of 597 hectares. The Parishes are not administrative divisions, and have no relationship with Bermuda's electoral districts.

Parish	Population (2016)	Population (2010)	Change (%)	Land area (km^{2})	Population density
Devonshire	7,087	7,330	−3.3%	5.97	1,187.1/km^{2}
Hamilton	5,584	5,862	−4.7%	5.97	935.3/km^{2}
Paget	5,899	5,702	+3.5%	5.97	988.1/km^{2}
Pembroke	11,160	10,614	+5.1%	5.97	1,869.3/km^{2}
St George's	5,659	6,422	−11.9%	6.6	857.4/km^{2}
Sandys	6,983	7,653	−8.8%	5.97	1,169.7/km^{2}
Smith's	5,984	5,406	+10.7%	5.97	1,002.3/km^{2}
Southampton	6,421	6,633	−3.2%	5.97	1,075.5/km^{2}
Warwick	9,002	8,615	+4.5%	5.97	1,507.9/km^{2}

Note on pronunciation:

- The "y" in Sandys is silent (though often mispronounced "san-dees", it should be "sands")
- The second "w" in Warwick is not pronounced

== Municipalities ==
- Hamilton (City) (854) (1.37 km^{2})
- St. George's (Town) (1,527) (0.7 km^{2})

Whereas the town of St George's is surrounded by St George's Parish, Hamilton Parish and the city of Hamilton are not close to each other geographically.

Saint George's, the larger of the two municipalities, served as Bermuda's capital until 1815 until the newly established Hamilton replaced it.

== Villages ==
Bermuda has two villages (unincorporated urban areas)

- Flatts Village (412)
- Somerset Village (1,000)
