= Warwick Parish =

Parish of Bermuda

Coordinates: 32°16′00″N 64°48′30″W

Warwick Parish is one of the nine parishes of Bermuda. It is named after Robert Rich, 2nd Earl of Warwick (1587-1658).

It is located in the central south of the island chain, occupying part of the main island to the southeast of the Great Sound, the large expanse of water which dominates the geography of western Bermuda, and also a number of islands which lie within that sound. It is joined to Southampton Parish in the southwest, and to Paget Parish in the northeast. As with most of Bermuda's parishes, it covers just over 2.3 square miles (about 6.0 km^{2} or 1500 acres). It had a population of 9,002 in 2016.

Natural features in Warwick include Warwick Long Bay, Riddell's Bay, Darrell's Island, Hawkins Island, Long Island, and Marshall's Island. Hinson's Island, once part of Warwick, is now part of Paget Parish. Warwick Long Bay is also located near Jobson’s Cove, with just 0.3 miles (0.5 KM) separating them, making it easy to visit both beautiful spots in one day.

The parish also contains Warwick Camp, the former rifle ranges of the Imperial military garrison, which is, today, the home of the Bermuda Regiment, and most of which doubles as parkland (and the territory of which includes Warwick Long Bay, Horseshoe Bay, and the smaller beaches between).

Christ Church on Middle Road, Warwick is one of the world's oldest Presbyterian churches outside of Europe. It was founded in 1719 and is part of the Church of Scotland.

Warwick Pond was designated a Ramsar site on May 11, 1999.

== Sports ==
PHC Zebras football club returned to PHC Field in 2015 after 17 years. It was named Warwick Stadium when it hosted its first match in the Bermuda Football Union.

== Education ==
Schools in the parish include:

- Warwick Preschool
- Purvis Primary School
- T.N. Tatem Middle School
- Warwick Academy (private school)

== Notable people ==
- Francis Landey Patton (1843–1932) Born and schooled in Warwick Parish. Presbyterian minister who went on to become president of what is today Princeton University (1888–1902).
- William Alexander Scott CBE JP (born 1940 in Bermuda) is a politician in Bermuda who is the MP for the Warwick South East constituency. Between 2003 and 2006 he served as the Premier of Bermuda
- Dale Russell (born 1955 in Warwick Parish) is a U.S. retired soccer forward who played in the North American Soccer League
- Marco Warren (born 1993 in Warwick Parish) is a Bermudian footballer who plays as a midfielder for PHC Zebras

== See also ==
- St. Anthony's Church
