= Western Redoubt =

Fort on Bermuda

- St. George's Garrison, St. George's Island, St. George's Parish, Bermuda
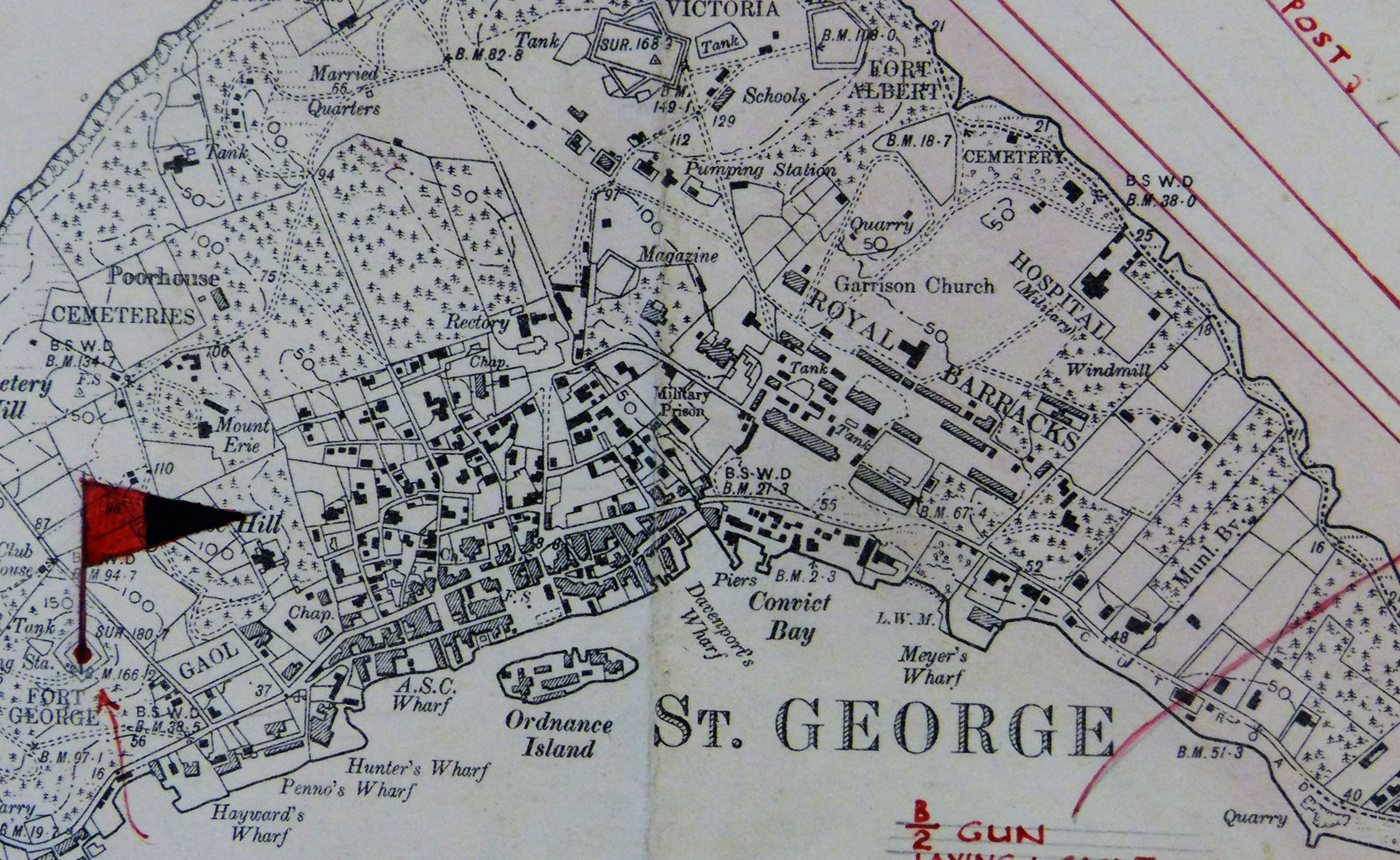
- St. George's Garrison (and St. George's Town) as surveyed by Lieutenant Arthur Johnson Savage, RE, in 1897-1899. Western Redoubt is at centre, marked as Magazine.

Site information
- Type: Fort; Magazine
- Owner: Board of Ordnance; War Office
- Operator: British Army
- Open to the public: No
- Condition: Increasingly derelict

Location
- Location of Western Redoubt in Bermuda
- Location within Bermuda
- Coordinates: 32.384454°N 64.675834°W

Site history
- Built: 1850s
- Built for: Royal Artillery
- In use: 1850s - 1957
- Materials: Stone

Garrison information
- Garrison: St. George's Garrison, Eastern District of the Bermuda Garrison
- Occupants: Royal Artillery; Royal Engineers; Royal Army Ordnance Corps

The Western Redoubt, or Fort William, is a square fort built on a crest on the eastern side of Government Hill, and within the boundaries of the original main British Army camp in the Imperial fortress colony of Bermuda, St. George's Garrison.

== History ==
The fort, originally intended to be named Fort William was built on a hilltop between Government Hill (from which Government House had moved to Mount Langton in Pembroke Parish with the move of the Parliament of Bermuda and the colonial capital from St. George's Town to the then Town of Hamilton in 1815) and Barrack Hill, the site of the Royal Barracks of St. George's Garrison. Below these hills, on the southern, St. George's Harbour, side of the island, is St. George's Town.

Fort William was to be one of a number of new forts (most, though not Fort William, built on the sites of earlier forts) housing coastal artillery built in the early and mid-Nineteenth Century within or satellite to St. George's Garrison. The heaviest concentration of coastal artillery batteries and fortifications in Bermuda had, and would continue to be, at the East End of the archipelago of Bermuda, where St. George's Harbour and Castle Harbour (with its own history of fortification) were the only harbours easily accessible from the open Atlantic due to the reefline surrounding Bermuda. After the American War of Independence, Bermuda had been selected as the only remaining British territory between Nova Scotia and the British West Indies, being also in a position (640 miles off North Carolina) from which to dominate the Atlantic seaboard of the new United States of America. The Royal Navy spent a dozen years surveying the reef, identifying a channel (originally called Hurd's Channel after then-Lieutenant Thomas Hannaford Hurd, the officer who had located it, but now referred to as The Narrows) suitable for ships-of-the-line to enter the Northern Lagoon, the Great Sound, and Hamilton Harbour before establishing a base at Bermuda in 1795. Although the Admiralty began buying and leasing land at Bermuda's West End, on the Great Sound, for the eventual construction of the Royal Naval Dockyard, the lack of development and infrastructure there meant the Navy used St. George's as its base pending the construction of the dockyard on Ireland Island.

Hurd's Channel led from Five Fathom Hole, the opening in the reefline through which vessels previously had already passed into the original main eastern channel (between Paget Island and Governor's Island) into St. George's Harbour, around St. Catherine's Point at the north-eastern end of St. George's Island. A succession of forts named Fort St. Catherine's have existed on this point since 1612, and the fifth and last of these was built in the Nineteenth Century. On Retreat Hill to its rear, Fort Victoria and Fort Albert were built in the 1840s. Between them, the three guarded Hurd's Channel and the Northern Lagoon from navigation by an enemy.

To the rear of these three forts, two identical forts were built on hilltops on either side of St. George's Town. Fort William, on the northern side of the town and Fort George at Mount Hill (or Riche's Mount) on the western side, both overlooking the harbour, and to a greater or lesser degree the northern lagoon to the north of the island (the area of enclosed water immediately to the north of St. George's Island is called Murray's Anchorage, and had been the anchorage for the naval squadron of the North America Station when the naval base was at St. George's). The two forts therefore could operate also against enemy vessels entering the Northern Lagoon, but were primarily intended to fire on an enemy that entered the harbour and to provide rear defence to the forts on Retreat Hill and St. Catherine's Point.

Fort George was completed and armed, and later re-armed with more modern weapons. Fort William was completed but never armed as it was deemed by then to be excess to need. Instead, named the Western Redoubt, a roof was built over the gun floor, moat and keep, and the enclosed structure was used as a magazine. An earlier magazine had existed on Government Hill, from which a hundred barrels of gunpowder was stolen during the American War of Independence and supplied to the rebels in a plot organised by Henry Tucker and Benjamin Franklin. The main powder magazine of Bermuda was later at Hen Island and then Ordnance Island, with another added at Agar's Island later in the Nineteenth Century. The magazine in the Western Redoubt would have been subsidiary to the Ordnance depot on Ordnance Island.

Most of the coastal artillery batteries in Bermuda, excepting St. David's Battery, were either obsolete or reduced to a care and maintenance state that was not ready for war during post First World War cutbacks to the British Army.

In 1957, a later phase of cutbacks resulted in the closure of the Bermuda Garrison, with all regular units and detachments, including the Command staff, withdrawn, leaving only the part-time Bermuda Militia Artillery and Bermuda Rifles. The dockyard was re-rated as a base, losing its ability to repair or refit its vessels, and this was to close in 1995. All Admiralty and War Office, including St. George's Garrison, land was transferred to the colonial government in 1958.

The Western Redoubt would house a restaurant called The Gunpowder Tavern, but has been vacant and increasingly derelict since the 1990s, although it is now part of the UNESCO World Heritage Site the Historic Town of St George and Related Fortifications).

== Design ==
The fort is square shaped, and the gunfloor originally had emplacements for four guns, one on each side behind an earthwork glacis. Inside of these was a higher keep, separated from the gunfloor by a dry moat, with a drawbridge. The intended armament would have been for 64-Pounders on the gun floor, and four 24-Pounders atop the keep. The entire fort was roofed over for use as a magazine. The western slope of the hill was excavated to create a vertical escarpment, from which a tunnel forms an entrance from what is now a small car park beside Government Hill (Road).
