= Fort Victoria, Bermuda =

Fort Victoria
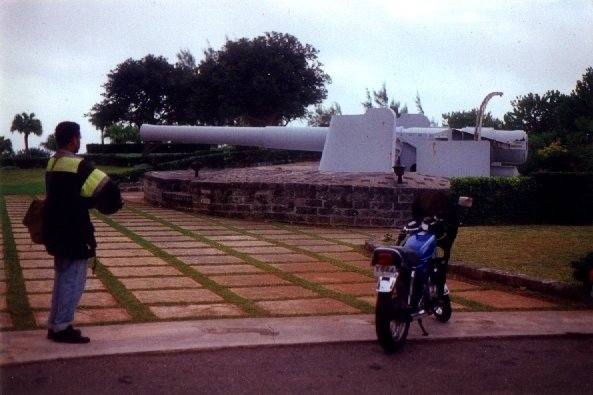
- A BL 9.2 inch gun Mk X at Fort Victoria, circa 1995.

- Location within Bermuda
- 32.3907°N 64.6744°W
- Location: St. George's Garrison, St. George's Island, Bermuda

History
- Built: 1842

UNESCO World Heritage Site
- Type: Cultural
- Criteria: iv
- Designated: 2000 (24th session)
- Part of: Historic Town of St. George and Related Fortifications, Bermuda
- Reference no.: 983
- Region: Europe and North America

Fort Victoria is a disused British Army fort, built to house coastal artillery atop Retreat Hill, within St. George's Garrison, at the North-East of St. George's Island, in the British colony of Bermuda.

The fort shares its hilltop location with Fort Albert, and the pair were named after Her Majesty Queen Victoria and her husband, Prince Albert. Both forts were built in 1842, on the suggestion of Colonel Edward Fanshawe, Royal Engineers, as part of the Bermuda Garrison built up by the British Army to defend the Royal Naval Dockyard and other strategic assets in Bermuda. The only channel through the reefline surrounding the archipelago that is suitable for large vessels passes the North-East ends of St. David's and St. George's Islands, which are at the East End of the archipelago of Bermuda. For this reason, the bulk of the nearly a hundred forts and gun batteries built in Bermuda between 1612 and 1939 are located on the eastern coasts of these two islands, and on Paget Island and the Castle Islands Fortifications, on smaller islands between St. George's and St. David's, and St. David's and the Main Island respectively.

Forts Victoria and Albert overlook Fort St. Catherine's, on the headland below. Fort Victoria is landward of Fort Albert. On the coast to the East is Alexandra Battery. All four of these defence works were placed to fire on enemy ships attempting to enter the Northern Lagoon via Hurd's Channel (also known as The Narrows). On hill tops to the south and southwestward of Retreat Hill, the Western Redoubt (also known as Fort William) and Fort George were built to watch over St. George's Harbour and to defend the forts on Retreat Hill and St. Catherine's Point from attack from the rear. The entire North-Eastern end of the island served as St. George's Garrison, the army base that was initially the headquarters for the Bermuda Garrison. After the infantry component of the garrison and the headquarters were moved to Prospect Camp in the 1860s, St. George's Garrison became primarily a Royal Artillery base, serving the various coastal artillery detachments in the East End forts and batteries.

Fort Victoria was originally armed with eighteen 32 pounder cannon. As with many forts built in this period, the armament was already becoming obsolete by the time it was completed. In the 20th century, the fort was given two Breech-Loading 9.2 inch gun Mk X (although one appears to have been moved to St. David's Battery on St. David's Island, which received two in 1910).

In April 1941 the United States Army Bermuda Garrison was formed under the Destroyers for Bases Agreement enabling the still-neutral United States to aid the British war effort by relieving it of the effort of defending British territory and sea lanes in the western North Atlantic. Several military and naval bases were built on Bermuda, and Fort Victoria became the home of some Coast Artillery Corps weapons as part of the Harbor Defenses of Bermuda. These included two 8-inch M1888 railway guns, initially manned by Battery F, 52nd Coast Artillery Regiment (Railway 8-inch gun). Another pair of these guns was at Scaur Hill Fort. Four 90 mm Anti Motor Torpedo Boat (AMTB) guns and a pair of 6-inch guns with a casemated magazine between them (called Battery Construction Number 284) were also installed by 1943. The railway guns were withdrawn in 1944.

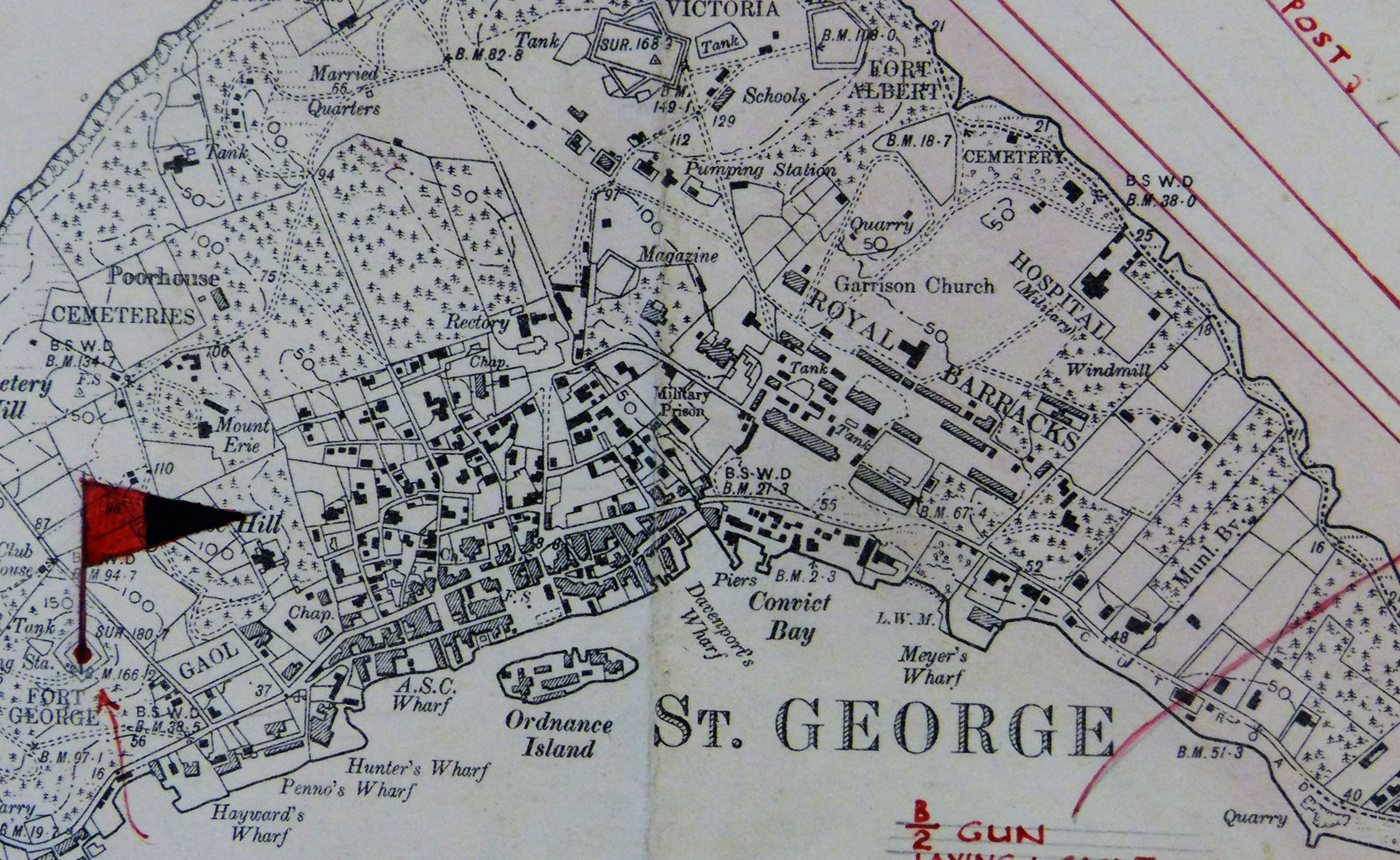
St. George's Garrison (and St. George's Town) as surveyed by Lieutenant AJ Savage, RE, in 1897-1899. Retreat Hill, with Forts Victoria and Albert, is at top-centre.

St. George's Garrison, with most of the other remaining Admiralty and War Office land in Bermuda was transferred to the colonial government in 1957. Forts Victoria and Albert were included in property leased to a succession of hotel operators (Holiday Inn, Loew's, and Club Med), which were permitted to damage the structures to create recreational areas for guests, including demolishing the keep of Fort Victoria. The hotel building itself, after years of sitting vacant, was removed by explosives in 2008, which badly damaged Fort Victoria.

The sole 9.2-inch gun that had been remaining at Fort Victoria was moved to the Royal Naval Dockyard for installation at the Bermuda Maritime Museum in The Keep, the largest fort in Bermuda, where it was emplaced (though not on its mount) for display in 2021, after eleven years of storage.

As a result of their historical significance, with fortifications spanning the full four centuries of English settlement in the New World, the forts at the East End of Bermuda, together with St. George's Town (or the Town of St. George), have been made a UNESCO World Heritage Site (the Historic Town of St George and Related Fortifications).

== Bibliography ==
- Berhow, Mark A., ed. (2015). American Seacoast Defenses, A Reference Guide (Third ed.). McLean, Virginia: CDSG Press. ISBN 978-0-9748167-3-9.
- Defence, Not Defiance: A History Of The Bermuda Volunteer Rifle Corps, Jennifer M. Ingham (now Jennifer M. Hind), The Island Press Ltd., Pembroke, Bermuda. ISBN 0-9696517-1-6
- The Andrew And The Onions: The Story Of The Royal Navy In Bermuda, 1795 – 1975, Lt. Commander Ian Strannack, The Bermuda Maritime Museum Press, The Bermuda Maritime Museum, P.O. Box MA 133, Mangrove Bay, Bermuda MA BX. ISBN 978-0-921560-03-6
- Bermuda Forts 1612–1957, Dr. Edward C. Harris, The Bermuda Maritime Museum Press, The Bermuda Maritime Museum. ISBN 978-0-921560-11-1
- Stanton, Shelby L. (1991). World War II Order of Battle. Galahad Books. ISBN 0-88365-775-9.
- Bulwark Of Empire: Bermuda's Fortified Naval Base 1860–1920, Lt.-Col. Roger Willock, USMC, The Bermuda Maritime Museum Press, The Bermuda Maritime Museum. ISBN 978-0-921560-00-5
