= St. George Island =

St. George Island (or Saint George Island) may refer to:

- St. George Island (Alaska)
- St. George Island (Florida)
- St. George Island, Maryland
- St. George's Island, Bermuda
- St. George Island (Montenegro)
- Looe Island (also known as St George's Island)
- São Jorge Island

== See also ==
- St George's Island (disambiguation)
- George Island (disambiguation)
- Isle St. George AVA, Ohio wine region
