= Historic Town of St George and Related Fortifications, Bermuda =

UNESCO World Heritage Site
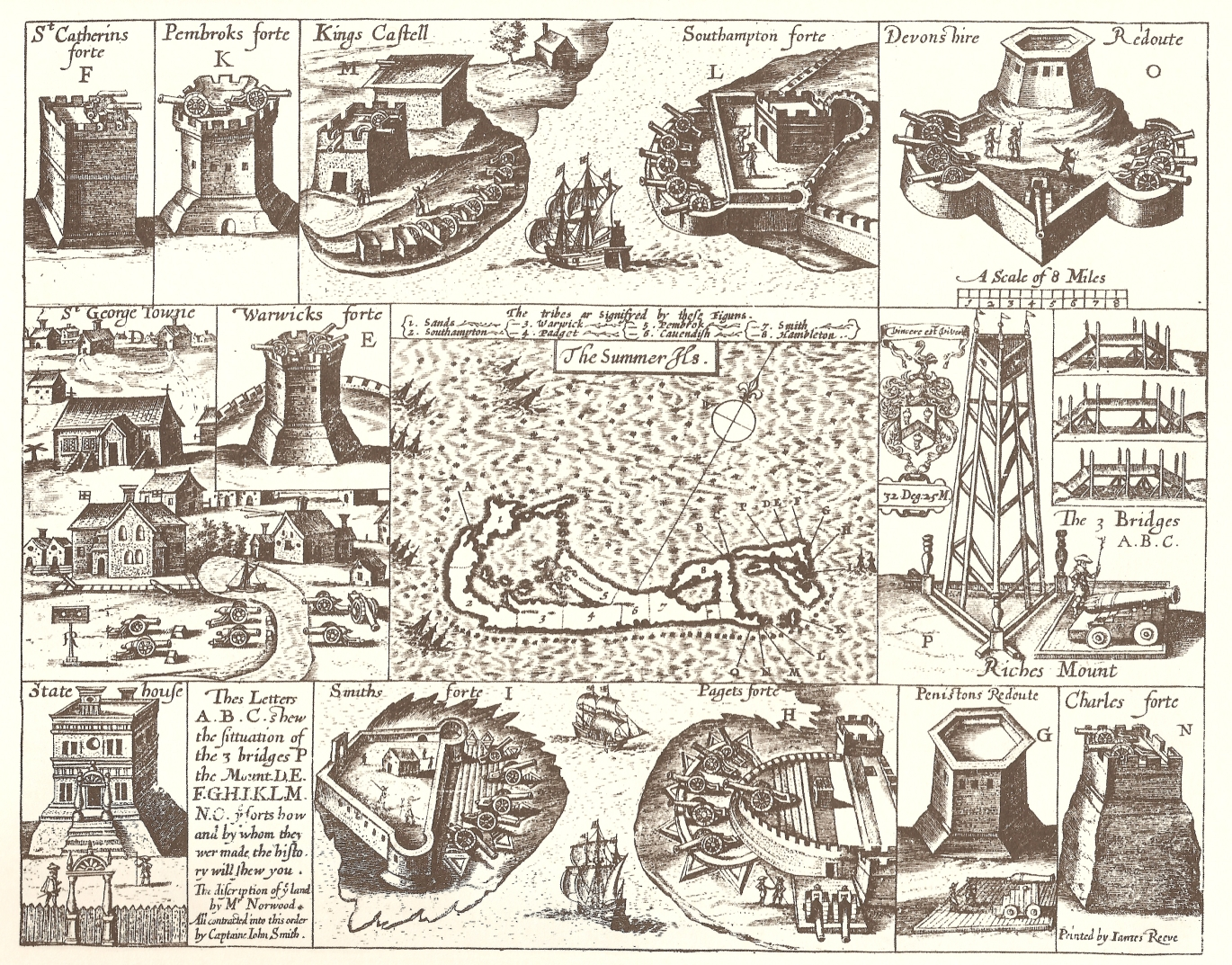
- Captain John Smith's 1624 map of Bermuda, showing contemporary fortifications.

- Location within Bermuda Location within North Atlantic
- Location: Bermuda, British Overseas Territories, United Kingdom
- Criteria: Cultural: (iv)
- Reference: 983
- Inscription: 2000 (24th Session)
- Area: 257.5 ha (636 acres)
- Buffer zone: 746 ha (1,840 acres)
- Coordinates: 32°22′46″N 64°40′40″W

The Historic Town of St George and Related Fortifications is the name used by the United Nations Educational, Scientific and Cultural Organization's (UNESCO) World Heritage Committee to identify collectively as a World Heritage Site St. George's Town, founded in 1612 (following the 1609 wreck on Bermuda's reefs of the Sea Venture), and a range of fortifications, batteries, and magazines built between 1612 and 1939, the last of which was removed from use in 1953.

St. George's, located on the island, and within the parish of the same names, is the oldest surviving English town in the New World. Originally called New London, it was founded by the Virginia Company and was Bermuda's capital until 1815. It contains many historic buildings, including St. Peter's Church (consecrated in 1612, though the oldest parts of the present structure date to 1620), the oldest Protestant church in the New World, the State House, which had housed the Parliament of Bermuda from 1620 until 1815, and many other historical buildings, including the Tucker House, the Globe Hotel, the Mitchell House, Stuart Lodge, the Old Rectory, the Bridge House, the Carriage House, and the Unfinished Church.

== History ==
Starting from settlement of St. George's Town in 1612 (the permanent settlement of Bermuda had begun with the wreck of the Sea Venture, the flagship of the Virginia Company, but the three men who remained from that ship had lived on Smith's Island, prior to the arrival of more settlers in 1612), the colony's militia built and garrisoned a range of fortifications, mostly protecting the entrances to St. George's Harbour and Castle Harbour, both of which gave access to the town. These included forts on a string of islands separating Castle Harbour from the open Atlantic to the South, known collectively as the Castle Islands Fortifications, as well as other forts around the entrances to St. George's Harbour on St. George's, St. David's, and Paget, Islands.

Forts and batteries on the islands of St. George's Harbour (1-13) and Castle Harbour (14-25), Bermuda

Although a company of regular infantry soldiers was detached to Bermuda from 1701 onwards, the militia remained the primary defensive force of the colony. This changed, following US independence, which was recognised by the Crown in 1783. US independence deprived Britain of all of her mainland bases between the Maritimes and Florida (which it returned to Spanish sovereignty, but continued to operate from until the First Seminole War resulted in Spain ceding the colony to the USA). Bermuda was launched into prominence for the Royal Navy, which began buying land at the West End of the archipelago for the construction of a Dockyard and naval base. At that time, no passage through the encircling reef sufficient to allow large Ships-of-the-line to reach the West End was known, so the Royal Navy built up its establishment in and around St. George's Town, including at Convict Bay and the storehouse built on the town's docks (Bermuda's only brick building, which currently houses the Carriage House Museum). Within a dozen years, a suitable passage to the West End (Hurd's Channel) had been located, and the Royal Navy began relocating its shore establishments westwards. The naval base in Bermuda was to play an important role in the American War of 1812. Bermuda would also become the headquarters of the Royal Navy in the Western North Atlantic (in the Western South Atlantic, it was permitted to maintain a large base in Brazil) until the 1950s. Its naval and military importance saw the colony of Bermuda re-designated as an Imperial fortress.

The build up of the naval base in Bermuda made the colony a likely target in any war in the Western North Atlantic. This required the build up by the British Army of a large Bermuda Garrison of professional soldiers. The regular soldiers took over the garrisoning of various militia forts, rebuilding and re-arming many of them. They also set about building a series of new forts and batteries, military camps, and various other military facilities throughout the 19th and early 20th Centuries. Although the Royal Naval Dockyard was at the Western extremity of Bermuda, concentrated on Ireland Island, and the capital of Bermuda had moved from St. George's to Hamilton, in the central parishes (which had already eclipsed St. George's as the economic centre), the only route by which any useful invading force could land, or carry out a naval attack on the West End, was still via the channels that led them around the North-East ends of St. David's and St. George's Islands, and this is where the coastal artillery and fortifications continued to be most concentrated. In addition to the many forts and batteries scattered around the area, the army built a large munitions depot on Ordnance Island, within the Town itself, and barracks and other facilities in the St. George's Garrison area to the North of the town. With so many regular soldiers in Bermuda, the Parliament of Bermuda came to see the militia as superfluous, and allowed it to lapse after the American War of 1812, not authorizing new part-time reserves until compelled to do so by the Secretary of State for War in 1885.

Although no military force ever attempted a serious invasion of Bermuda (a handful of small raids by Spanish, French and Bermudian-American vessels were either fended off with a few shots, or saw the attackers flee before militia and local privateers could reach them), the threat of an attack on Bermuda was increased in the 19th century, not only by the proliferation of strategic targets, like the Dockyard, but because large amounts of munitions were funnelled to the Confederates, primarily through warehouses and docks of St. George's. This resulted in considerable animosity from the US, and despite Britain paying war reparations, there was lingering concern, during the war and for decades after, of either a US attack in force, aiming to capture the archipelago, or of raids and sabotage by US based Fenians. This, in fact, had been one of the issues used by the Secretary of State for War to compel the local government to create Volunteer army units. With commerce in the town stagnating due partly to the constraints of the channels which entered its harbour from the Atlantic, it was desired to widen and dredge the channels to allow easier access for large, modern vessels. At the same time, the Government of Bermuda was supporting the construction of a large new hotel in Hamilton (the Princess) to serve the nascent tourism industry, for which US investment was sought (foreign ownership of property or business in Bermuda was forbidden lest a foreign government use protecting the interests of its nationals as a pretext for invasion). The Secretary stated that he could not allow either project to proceed while Bermuda contributed nothing to her defence, which finally prompted the local government to authorise two part-time units in 1885 (having ignored the requests of the London government for it do so for decades).

Most of the forts, even those only built towards the end of the 19th century, were obsolete by the early years of the 20th century due to advances in both coastal and naval artillery, although some of the later batteries of Rifled Breech Loaders, such as St. David's Battery (also known as the Examination Battery), remained in use as late as 1953. By then, the decision had been made to close the dockyard, withdrawing both the majority of the Royal Naval establishment, and the remaining regular army component of the Bermuda Garrison (the part-time units, the Bermuda Volunteer Rifle Corps, re-titled the Bermuda Rifles, and the Bermuda Militia Artillery continued in existence without an Imperial defence role, amalgamating in 1965 to form the Bermuda Regiment.

== Gallery ==
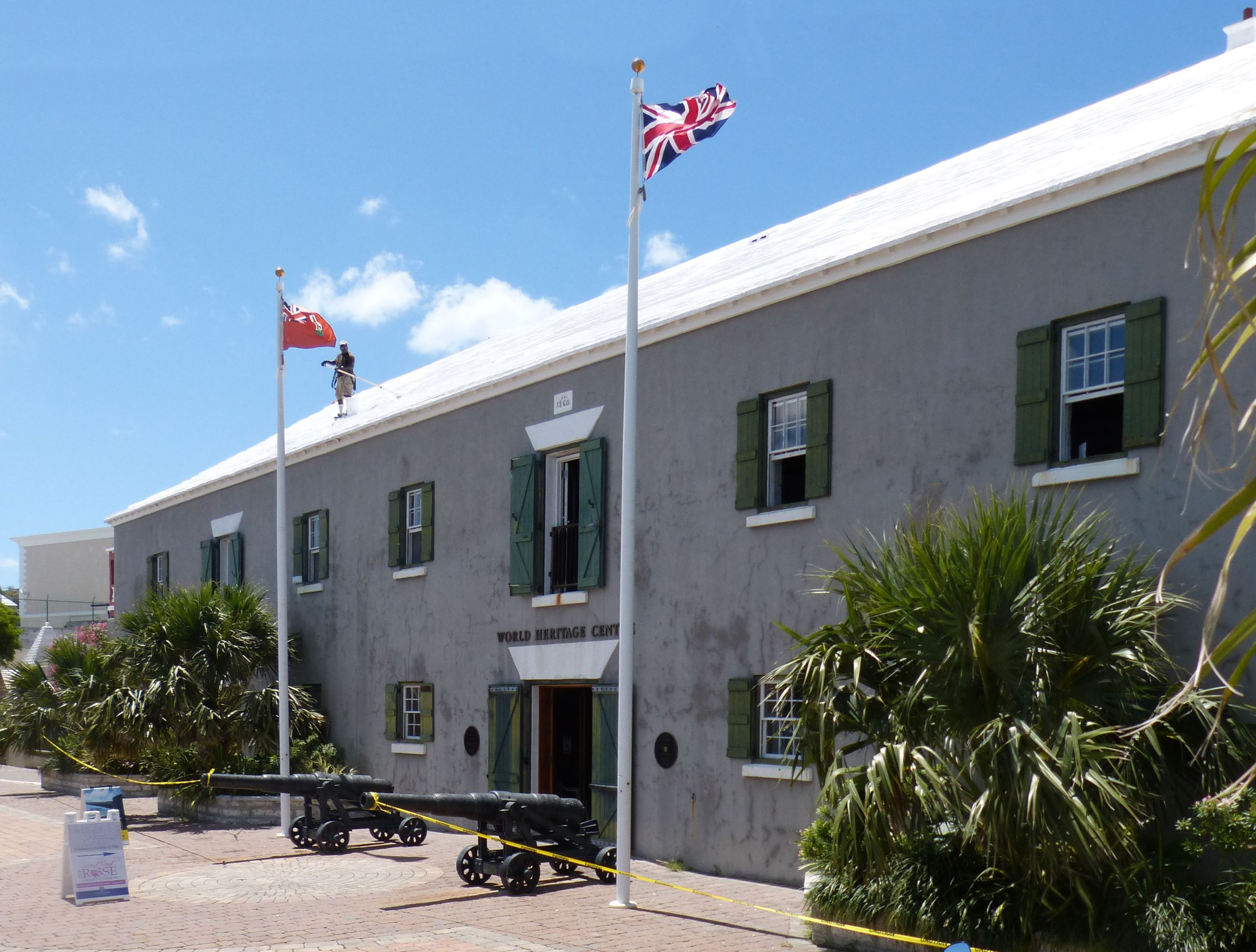
The St. George's Foundation's UNESCO World Heritage Centre, in St. George's Town.

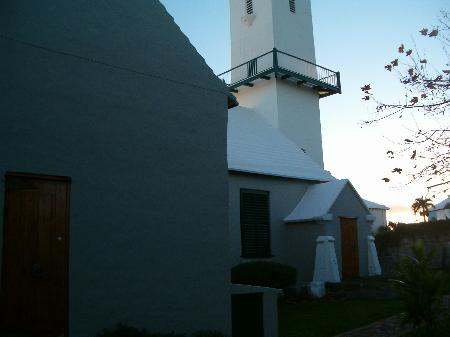
St. Peter's Church, St. George's.

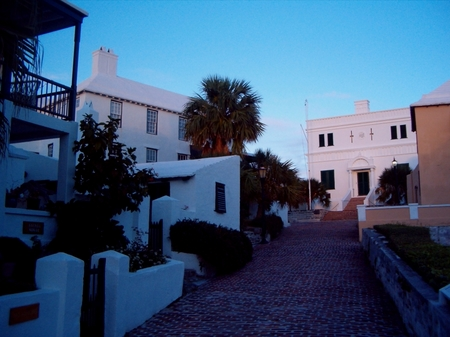
The State House.

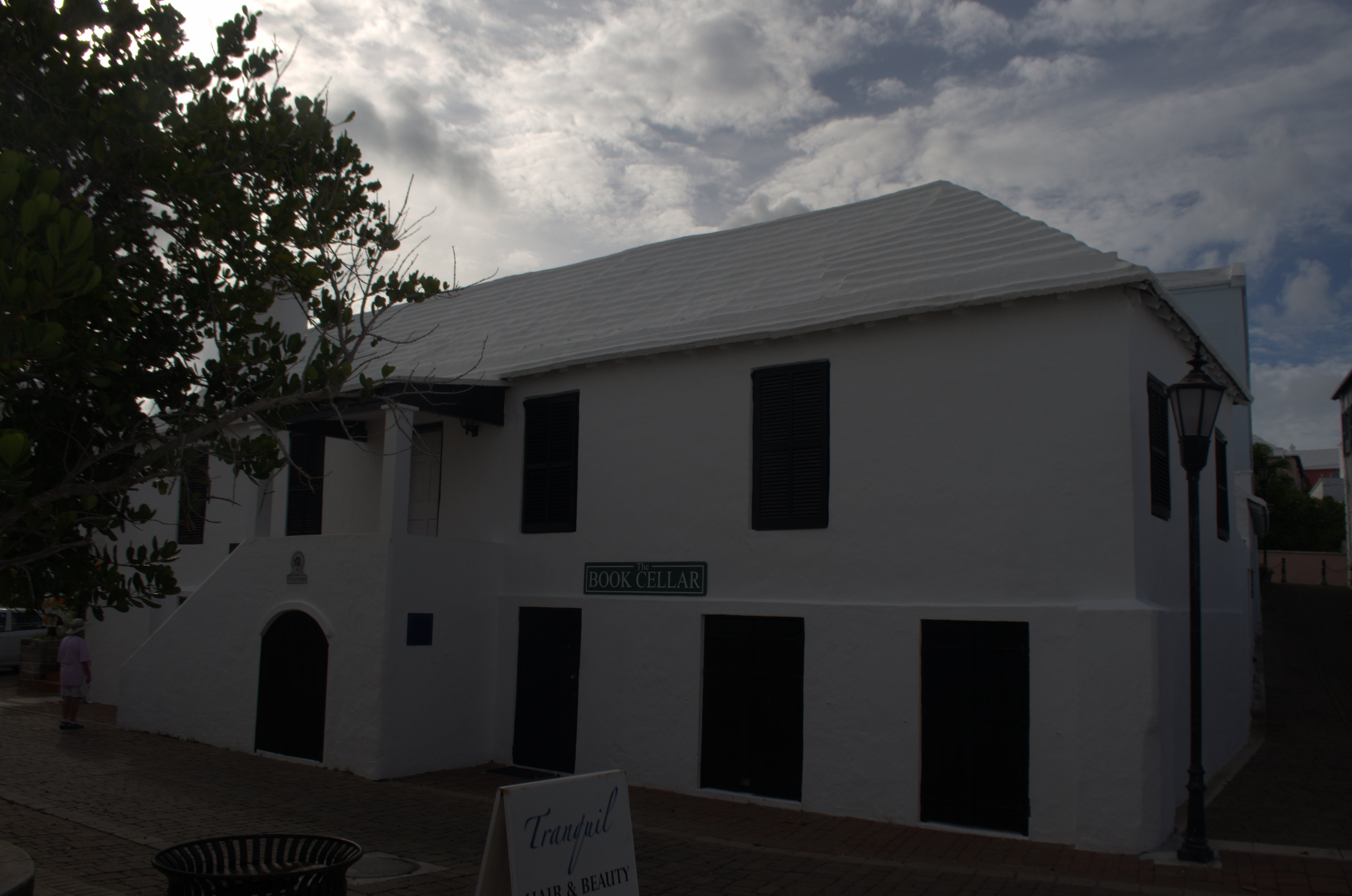
House of George Tucker in St. George, Bermuda

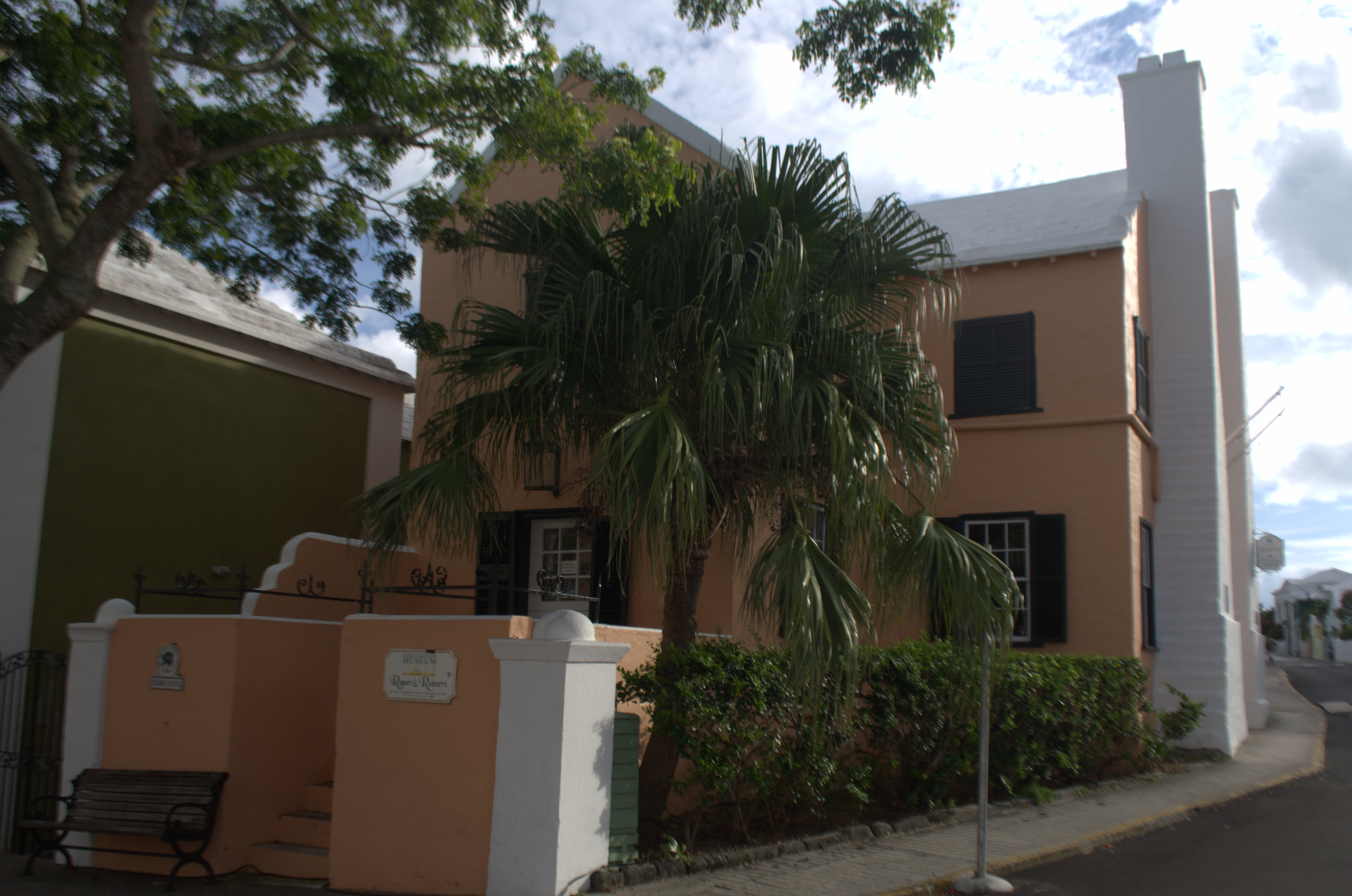
Globe Hotel in St. George, Bermuda

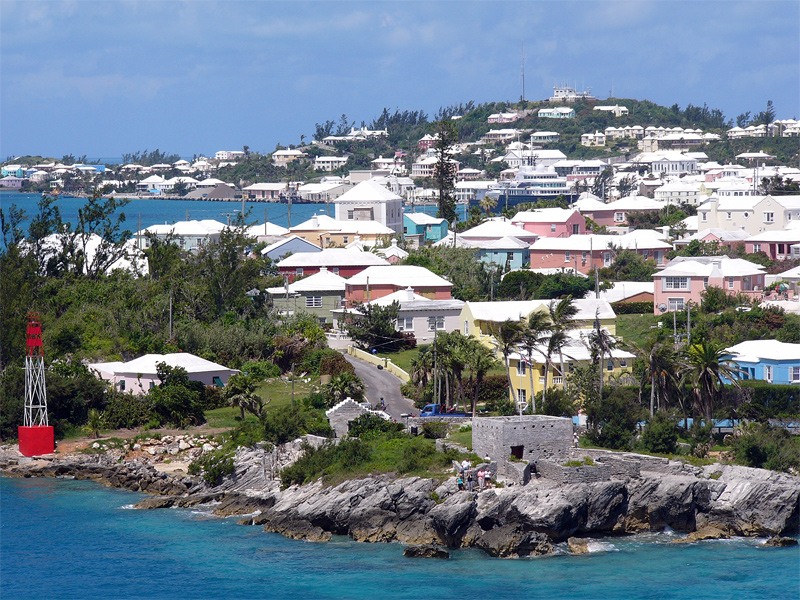
Residential suburb near the old St. George's Garrison, with "Town Cut Battery" or "Gate's Fort" on the shore of the Town Cut, and St. George's Town and harbour in the background

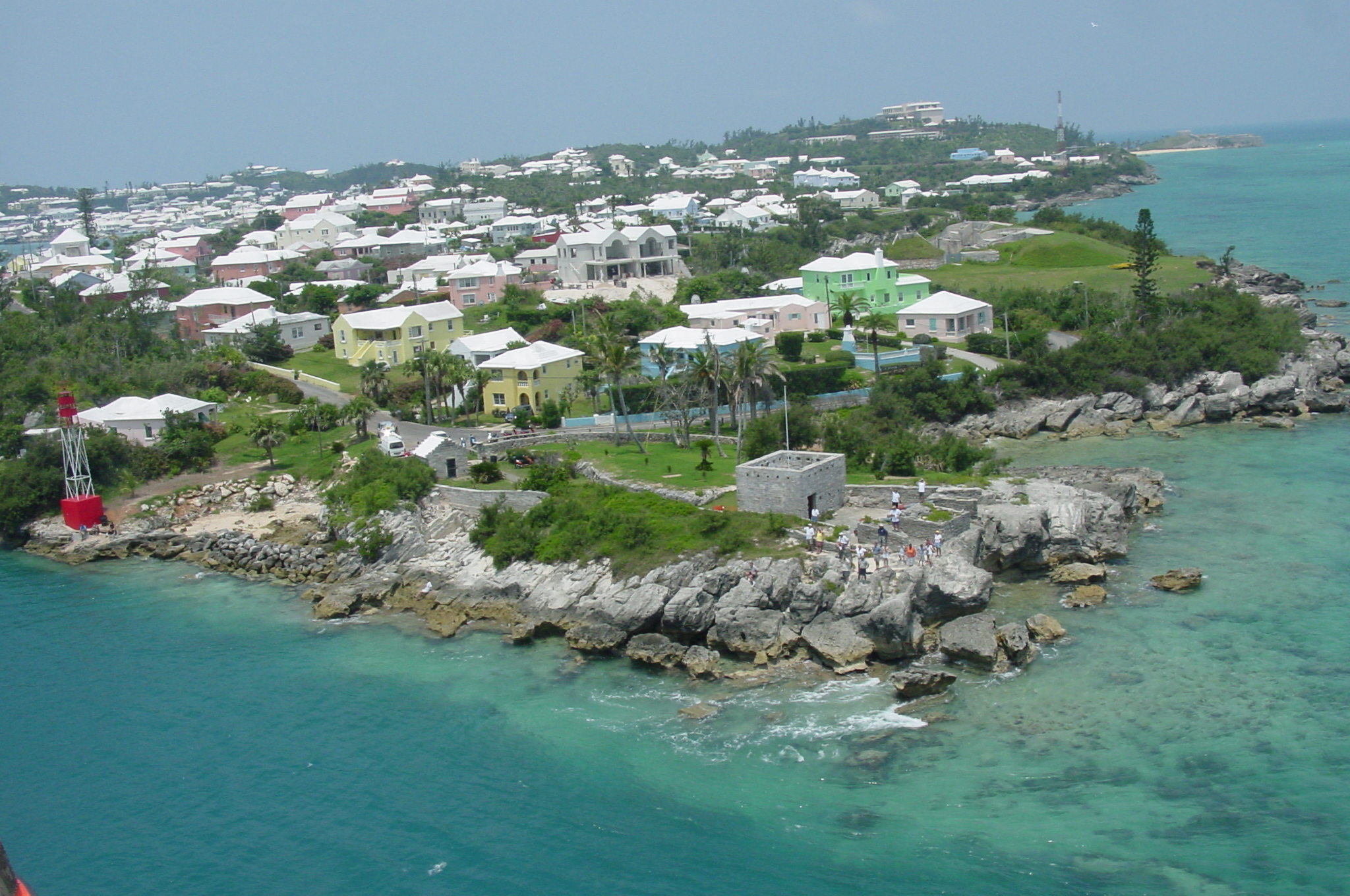
Cut Battery, with Alexandra Battery, Fort St' Catherine's, and Retreat Hill (with Fort Victoria and Fort Albert) visible

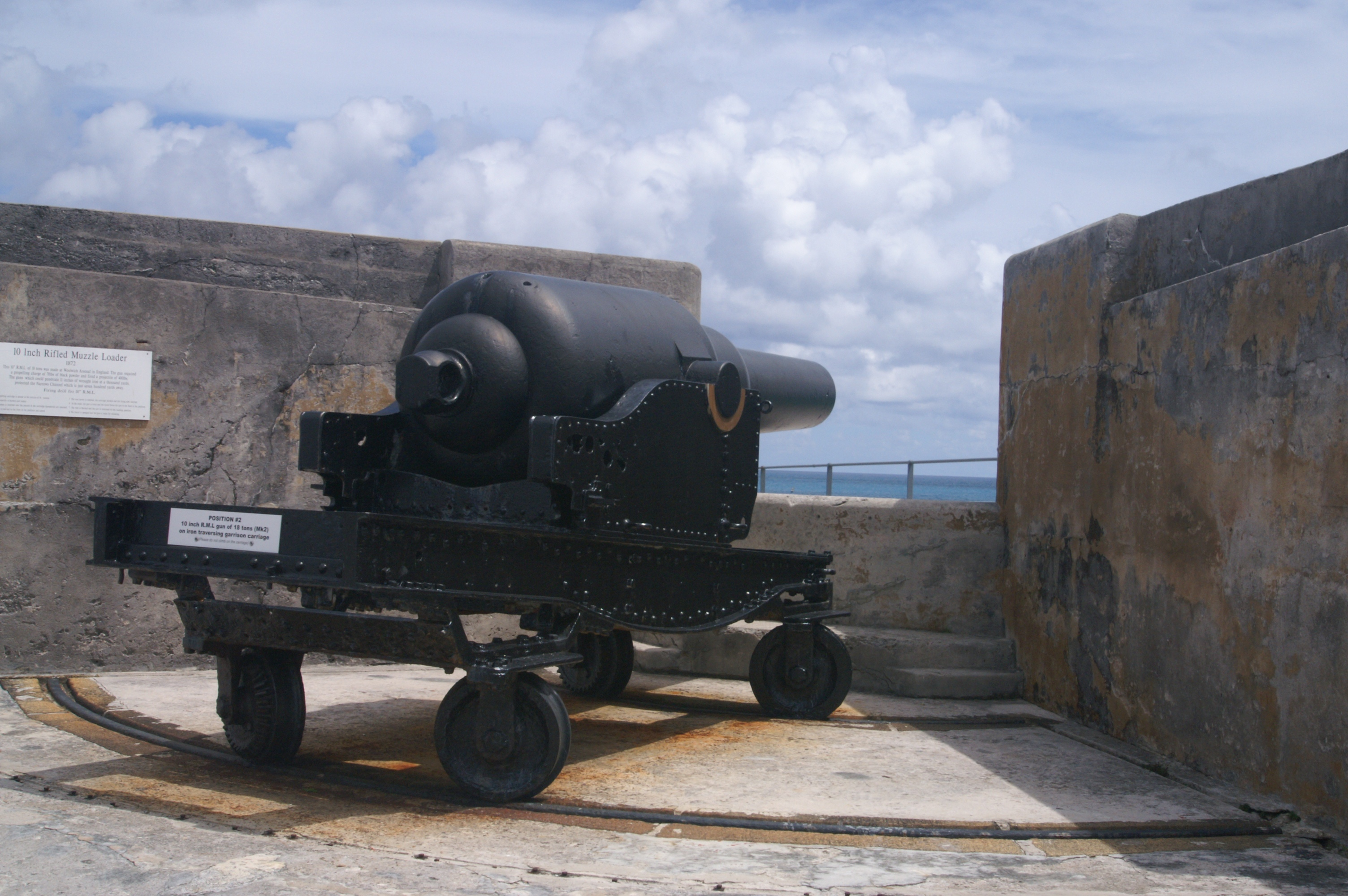
An RML 10 inch 18 ton gun at Fort St Catherine.

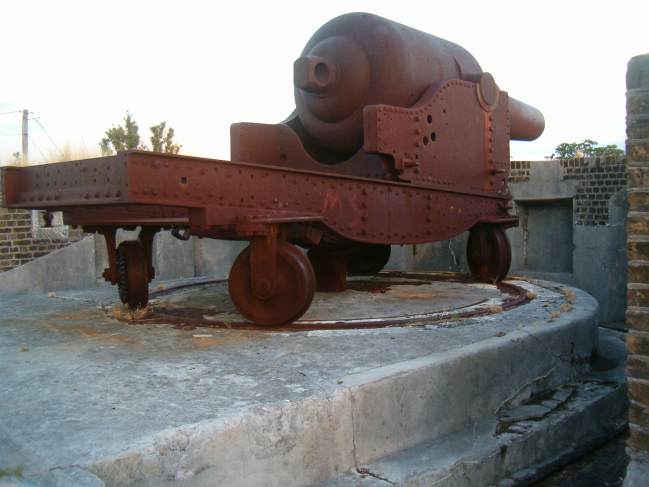
RML 11 inch 25 ton gun at Fort George in St. George's, Bermuda.

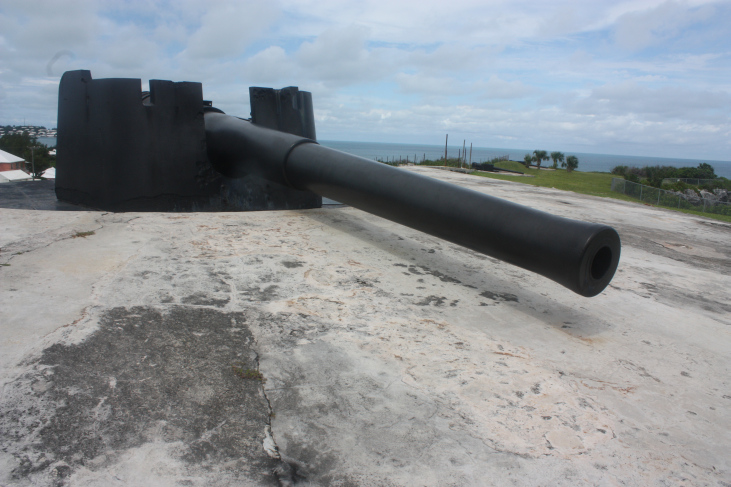
St. David's Battery (or the Examination Battery), St. David's, Bermuda in 2011.

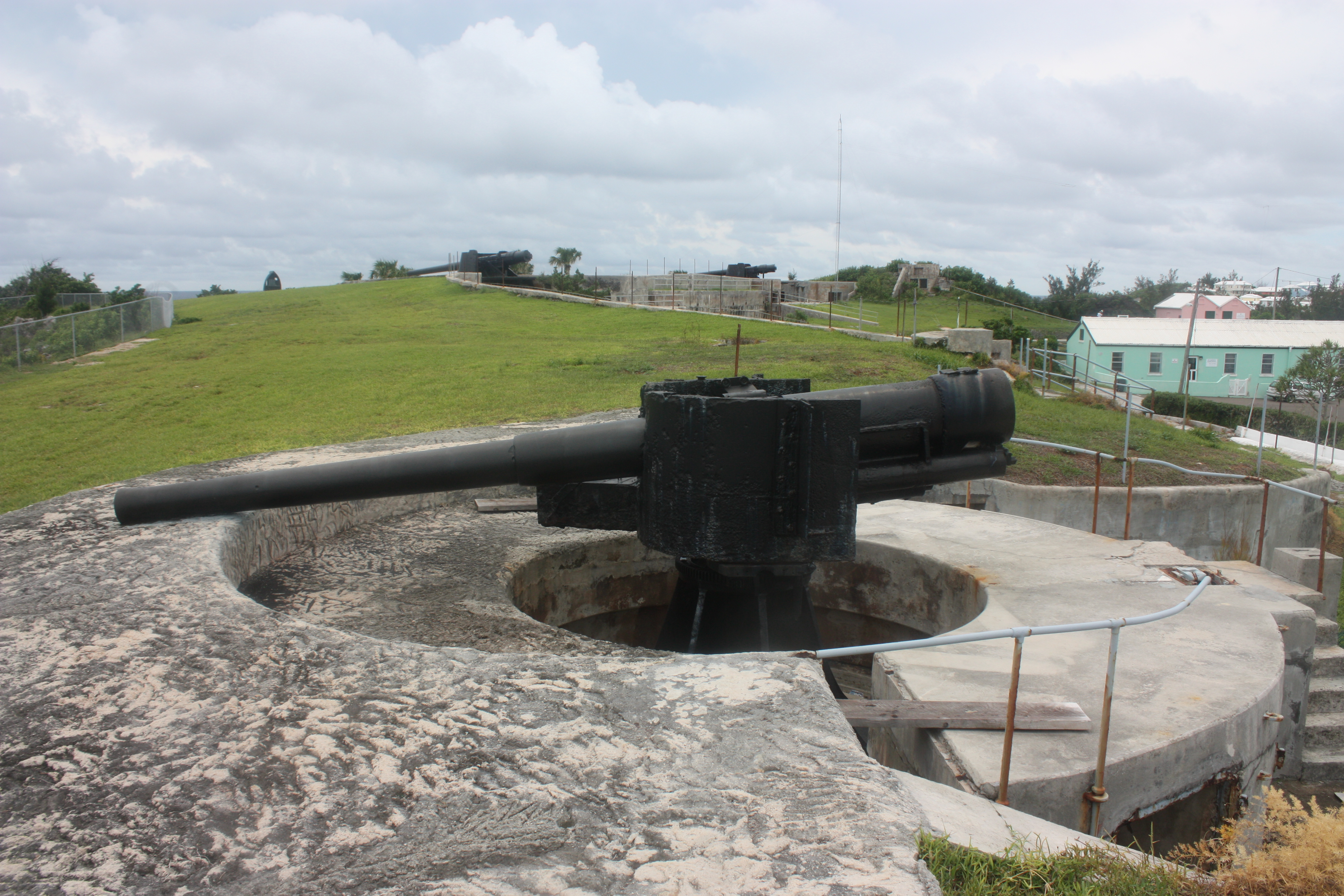
One of two 6 inch Mk VII guns, on Central Pivot Mk II mount, and two 9.2 inch Mk. Xs. St. David's Battery. 2011.

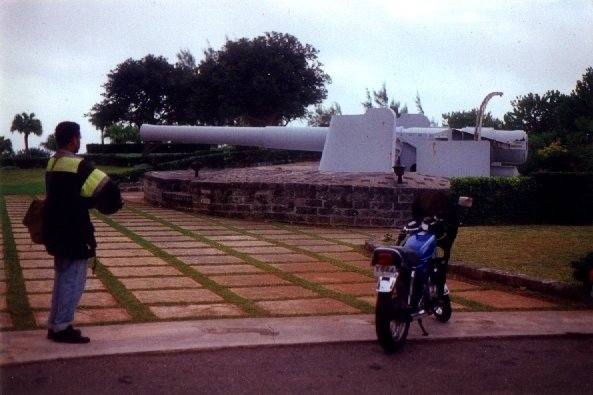
BL 9.2 inch gun Mk X at Fort Victoria on St. George's Island in Bermuda.

== List of included sites ==
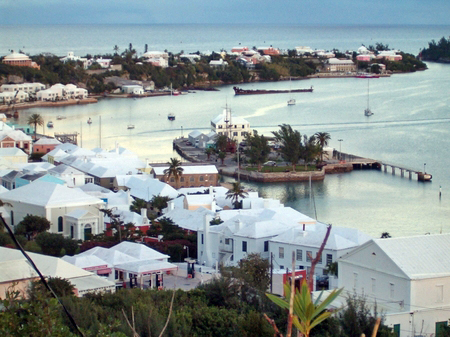
St. George's Town, including Ordnance Island, the former RAOC depot.

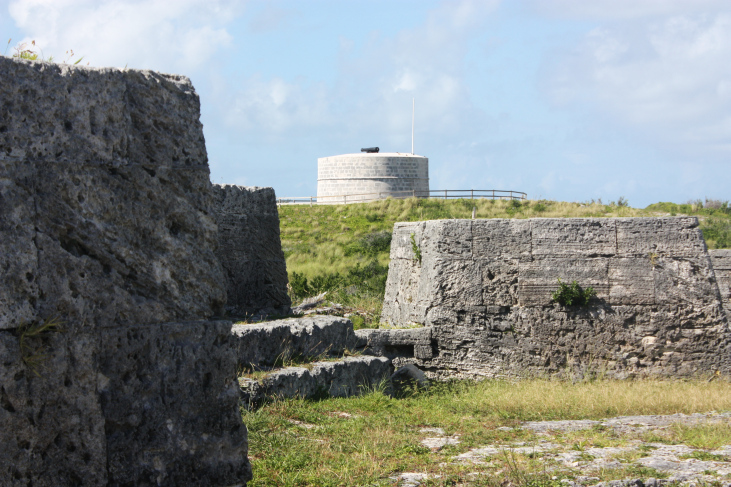
Martello Tower seen from Ferry Island Fort, Ferry Reach, Bermuda 2011.

In sites listed within the description of the World Heritage Site, including the Town of St. George (or St. George's Town, usually referred to simply as St. George's), and the related fortifications (and batteries and magazines) follow:

1. Historic Town of St George (or St. George's Town, shortened to St. George's) (including parts of St. George's Garrison, in addition to certain forts and batteries, that fall within the town boundaries, Ordnance Island, Convict Bay, and other historical naval and military sites within the town)
2. Devonshire Redoubt
3. Landward Fort
4. Seaward Fort (King's Castle)
5. Southampton Fort
6. St. David's Battery
7. Fort Popple
8. Paget Fort
9. Smith's Fort
10. Fort Cunningham
11. Musketry Trenches
12. Peniston's Redoubt
13. Alexandra Battery
14. Gate's Fort (Town Cut Battery)
15. Fort Albert
16. Fort St. Catherine
17. Fort Victoria
18. Western Redoubt (Fort William)
19. Fort George
20. Burnt Point Fort
21. Martello Tower
22. Ferry Reach Magazine
23. Ferry Island Fort
24. Coney Island Kiln
