= St George's Island (disambiguation) =

St George's Island, or Looe Island, is a small island off Cornwall, England.

St George's Island may also refer to:

- São Jorge Island, in the Azores
- St. George's Island, Bermuda, in Bermuda
- St. George's Island, a fictional country in the television show Yes, Prime Minister

== See also ==
- St. George Island (disambiguation)
