= King George Island =

King George Island may refer to:

- King George Island (South Shetland Islands), Antarctica
- King George Island (Tasmania), Australia
- King George Islands, Polynesia
- King George Islands (Canada), part of the Belcher Islands
- King George III Archipelago, a name used for the Alexander Archipelago in the 19th century

== See also ==
- George Island (disambiguation)
