= RML 11-inch 25-ton gun =

Ordnance RML 11-inch 25-ton gun
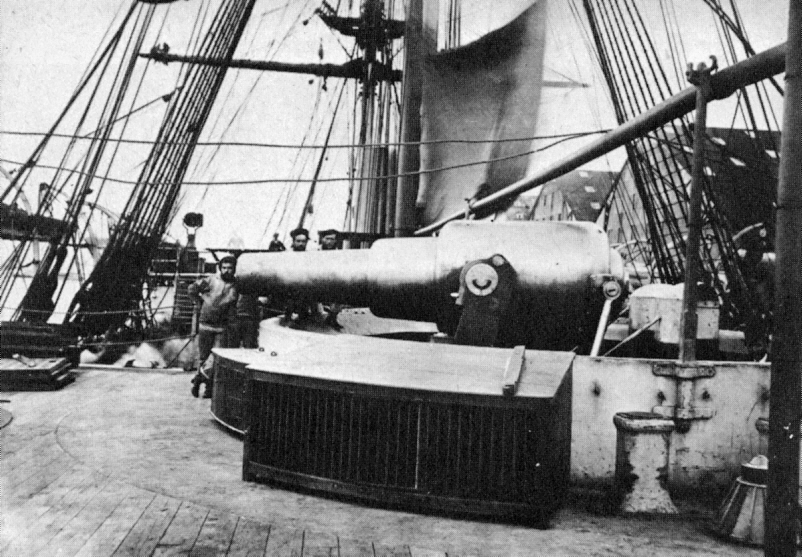
- Disappearing gun on HMS Temeraire in firing position
- Type: Naval gun Coast defence gun

Service history
- In service: 1867–1903
- Used by: Royal Navy
- Wars: Bombardment of Alexandria

Production history
- Manufacturer: Royal Arsenal
- Unit cost: £1,589 (18751)
- Variants: Mk I, Mk II

Specifications
- Mass: 25 long tons (25,000 kg)
- Barrel length: 145 inches (3.7 m) (bore + chamber)
- Shell: 532 to 543 pounds (241.3 to 246.3 kg) Palliser, Common, Shrapnel
- Calibre: 11-inch (279.4 mm)
- Muzzle velocity: 1,360 feet per second (410 m/s)

RML 11-inch 25-ton guns were large rifled muzzle-loading guns used as primary armament on British battleships and for coastal defence. They were effectively the same gun as the RML 12-inch 25-ton gun, bored to 11 inches instead of 12.

== Design ==
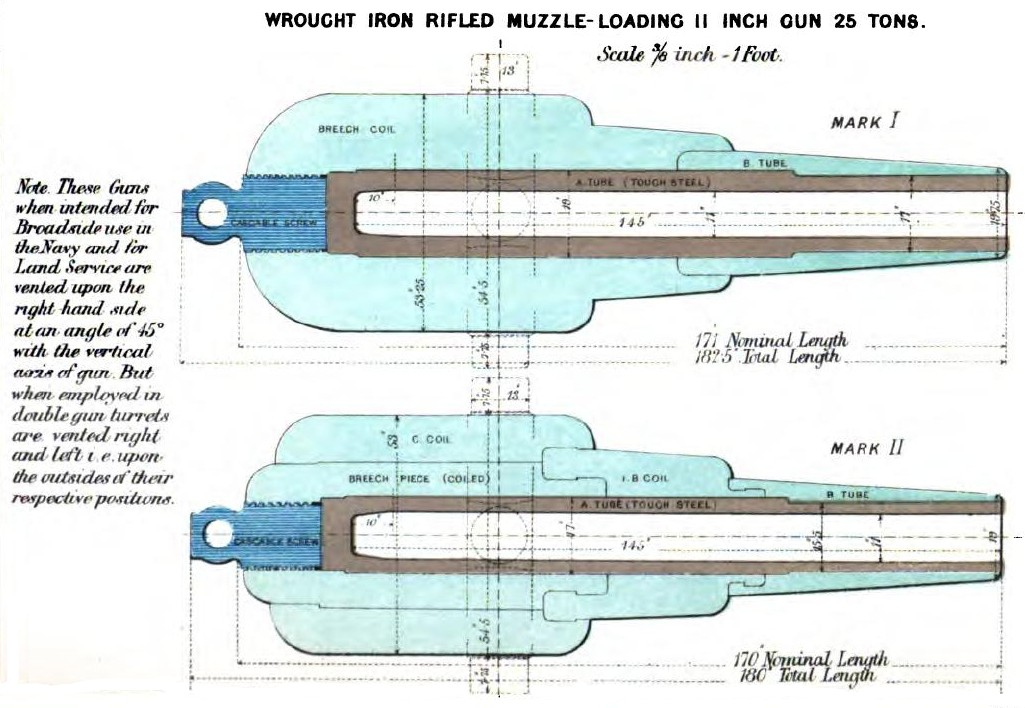
Mark I & II gun construction

Mark I was introduced in 1867. Mark II was introduced in 1871 using the simpler and cheaper "Fraser" gun construction method which had proved successful with the RML 9-inch 12-ton Mk IV gun.

In 1874 the process of development made a "New Eighty-one Ton Gun" available in Woolwich.

== Naval service ==
Guns were mounted on:

- HMS Alexandra, commissioned 1877.
- HMS Temeraire, commissioned 1877.

== Ammunition ==
When the gun was first introduced projectiles had several rows of "studs" which engaged with the gun's rifling to impart spin. Sometime after 1878, "attached gas-checks" were fitted to the bases of the studded shells, reducing wear on the guns and improving their range and accuracy. Subsequently, "automatic gas-checks" were developed which could rotate shells, allowing the deployment of a new range of studless ammunition. Thus, any particular gun potentially operated with a mix of studded and studless ammunition.

The gun's primary projectile was 536–543 lb (243–246 kg) "Palliser" armour-piercing shot, which were fired with a "Battering charge" of 85 lb (39 kg) of "P" (gunpowder) or 70 lb (32 kg) of "R.L.G." (gunpowder) for maximum velocity and hence penetrating power. Shrapnel and Common (exploding) shells weighed 532–536 lb (241–243 kg) and were fired with a "Full charge" of 60 lb (27 kg) "P" or 50 lb (23 kg) "R.L.G.".

== Surviving examples ==
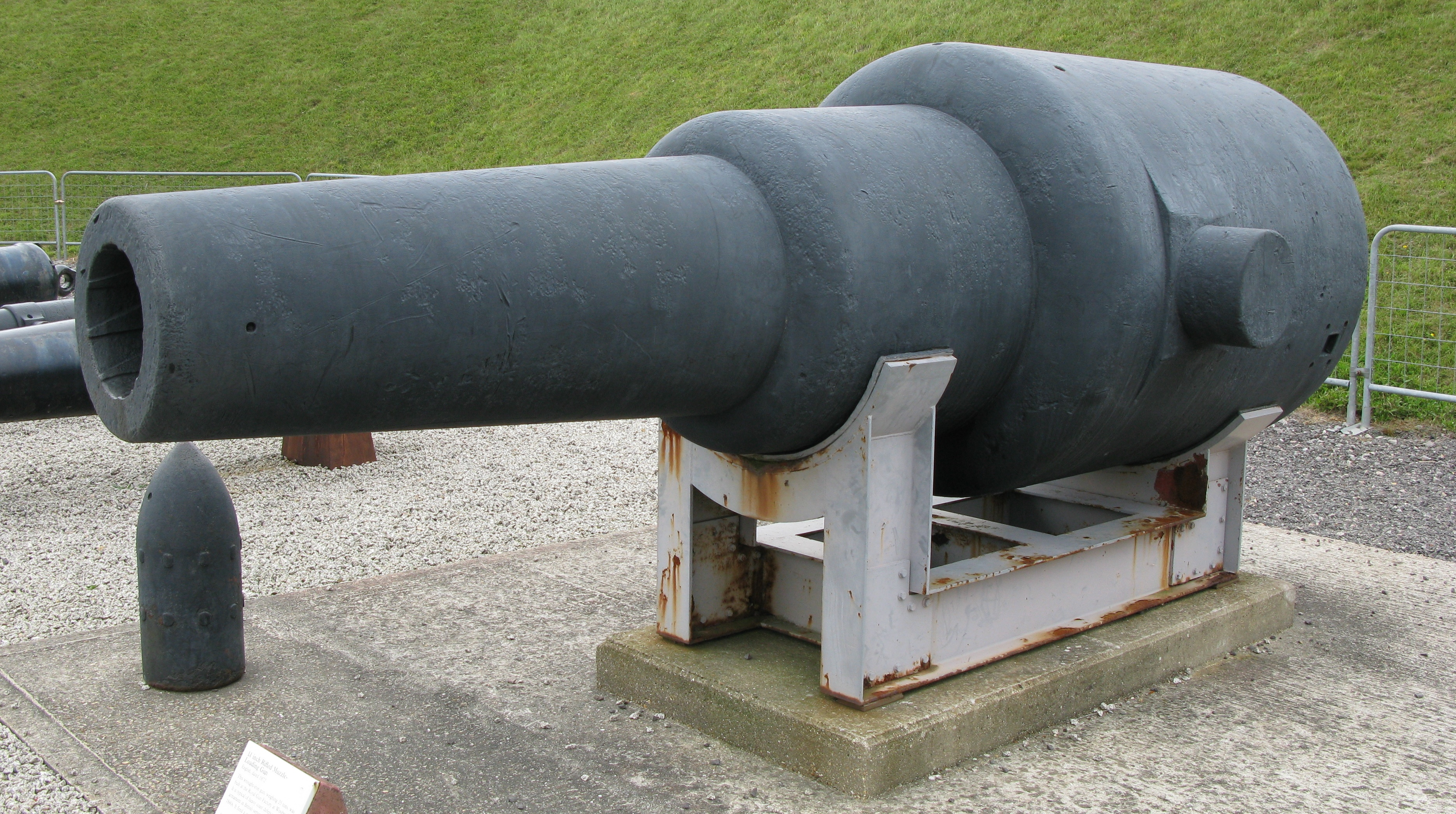
Mk II gun at Fort Nelson, Portsmouth, UK

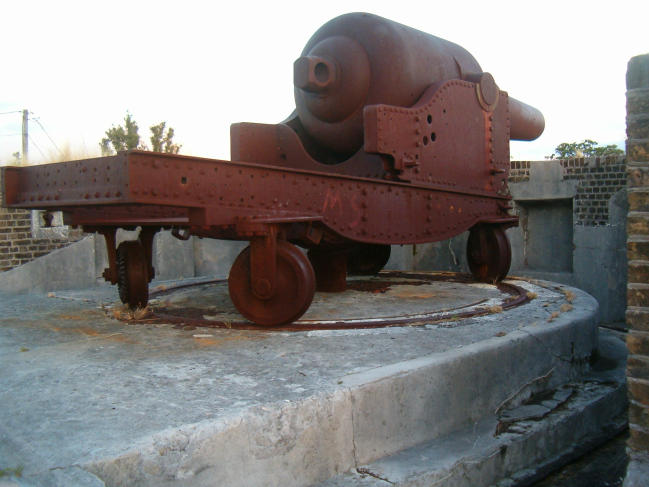
RML 11-inch 25-ton gun at Fort George in St. George's, Bermuda.

- Two Mark II guns, number 12 and 14 at Fort George, Bermuda :
- Mark II gun number 30 at Fort Nelson, Portsmouth, UK
- Three Mark II guns on Drake's Island, Plymouth, UK
- Four guns outside Fort Saint Elmo, Malta
- Mark II gun dated 1871 outside Fort St. Catherine, Bermuda

== See also ==
- List of naval guns
