= George Island (disambiguation) =

George Island is an island in the Falkland Islands. This place may also refer to:

- George Island (Lake Winnipeg)
- George Island (Greenland), near Meteorite Island
- Georges Island (Nova Scotia)
- George Dog Island, British Virgin Islands
- George Rocks, Tasmania

== See also ==
- King George Island (disambiguation)
- St. George Island (disambiguation)
