= St. George's Island, Bermuda =

One of the principal islands of Bermuda

St. George's Island
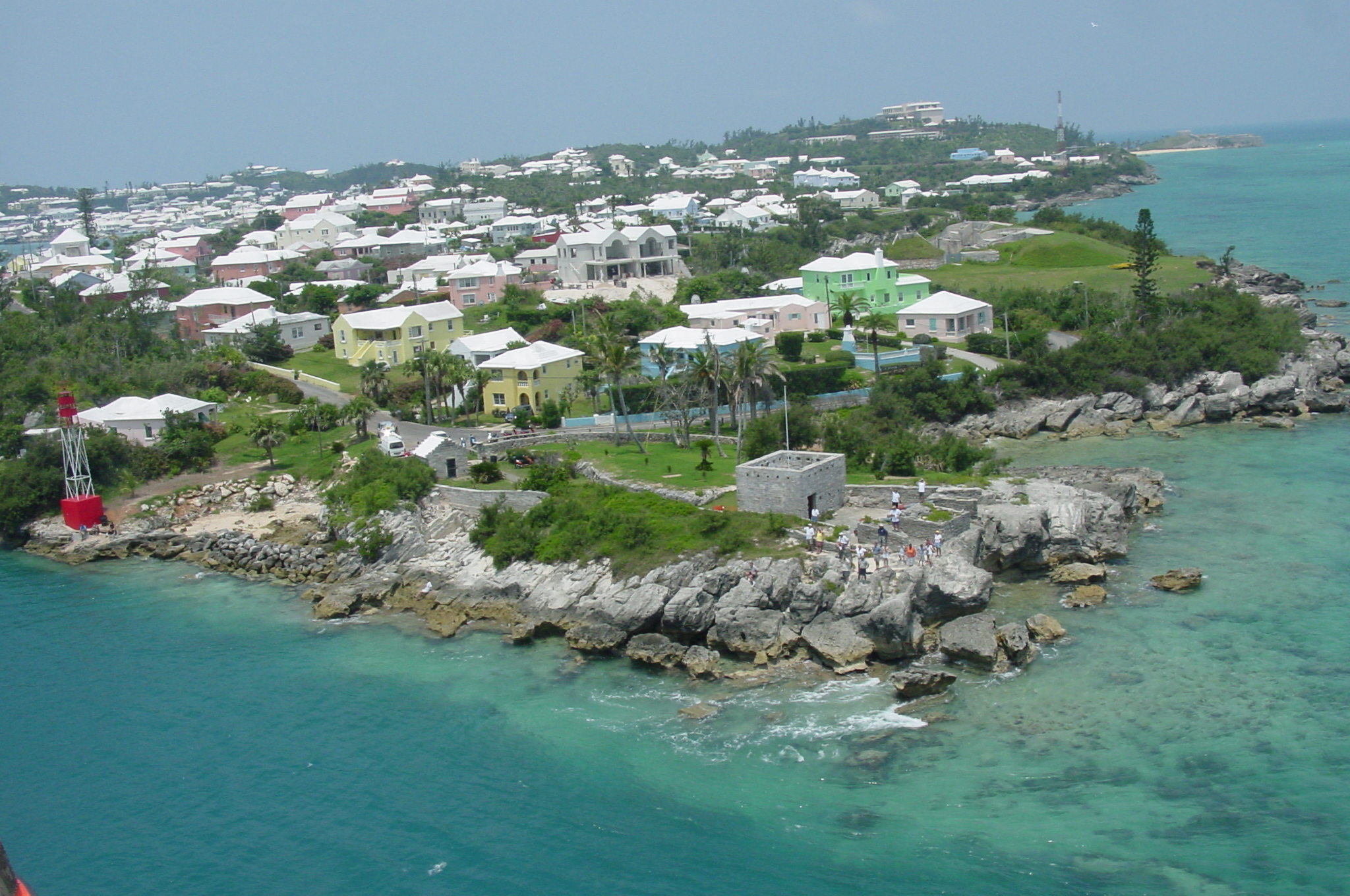
- A view of Gates' Fort on St. George's Island

- Location of St George's Island

- Location within Bermuda

Geography
- Location: North Atlantic Ocean
- Coordinates: 32°23′05″N 64°40′40″W

Administration
- Bermuda
- Parish: St. George's Parish

St. George's Island is one of the main islands of the territory of Bermuda and lies within St. George's Parish (originally designated the General Land, in distinction to the other eight parishes subdivided as private shares) at the East End of the archipelago (actually the northeast of the territory). St. George's Town, the original colonial capital, is located on the southern shore near the eastern end of the island. The island covers 703 acres (284.5 hectares), and is one of the six principal islands of Bermuda.

Originally called King's Island, it was the first part of Bermuda to be extensively colonised, and the town of St. George's contains many of the territory's oldest buildings. Notable among these are St. Peter's Church, and the State House. The island also is the site of the St. George's Garrison and many forts, including Burnt Point Fort, Coney Island Fort, Ferry Point Martello Tower, Gate's Fort, Alexandra Battery, Fort Victoria, Fort Albert, the Western Redoubt, Fort George, and Fort St. Catherine's, the last of which is at St. Catherine's Point, the island's (and the archipelago of Bermuda's) northernmost point, and is a 19th-century construction built upon a 17th-century base. It is beside Gates' Bay, where the first English settlers ship wrecked in the Sea Venture in 1609.

The island is separated from St. David's Island to its south by the St. George's Harbour, and from Coney Island and the Main Island to the south-west by a channel known as Ferry Reach. Bridges and a causeway connect it with the main island via St. David's Island.

The island is nearly split in two by the deep indentation of Mullet Bay, with the western part of the island connected to the rest by a narrow isthmus.

== Education ==
Schools on the island:

- St. George's Preschool
- St. George's Primary School in St. George's
- East End Primary School

== Notable people ==
- John Hamilton Gray
- Robert John Simmons
- Charles Stuart
- George Tucker (1775 in St George's Island – 1861 in Virginia) was an American attorney, politician, historian, author, and educator.
