= St. George's Harbour, Bermuda =

Natural harbour in the north of Bermuda

Coordinates: 32°22′26″N 64°40′32″W

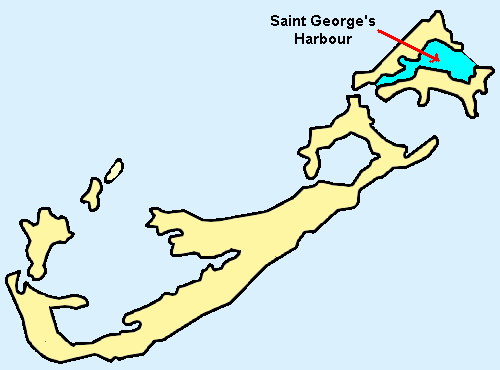
Location of St. George's Harbour in Bermuda

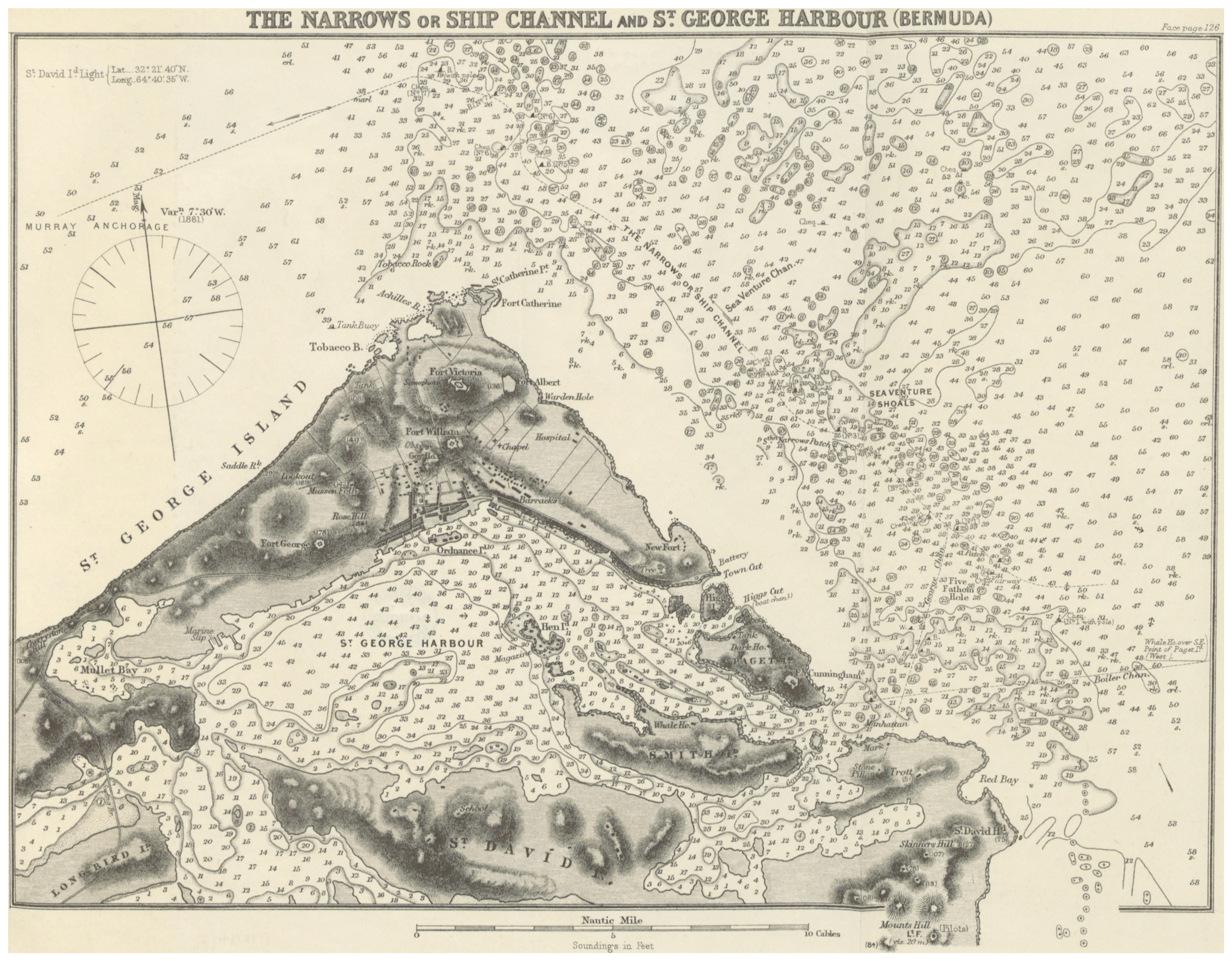
Nautical Chart of St. George's Harbour, Bermuda in the 1880s

St. George's Harbour is a natural harbour in the north of Bermuda. It serves as the port for the town of St. George's, located on St. George's Island, to its north. To its south is St. David's Island. The harbour and both islands lie within St. George's Parish. It was for two centuries the primary harbour of the British Overseas Territory.

== Topography ==
The harbour separates St. George's Island in the north and west from St. David's Island in the south and east. Several other islands lie to the south and east, closing the harbour from the open sea to the east, and separating it from Smith's Sound, to the South. It is open to the Atlantic Ocean at Gunner Bay in the northeast, where its mouth is guarded by numerous islands, notably Smith's and Paget Islands. The waters of Bermuda are also protected by coral reef, which can be perilous to sailors. Several other islands lie within the harbour, notably the historically important Ordnance Island. In the south, a long channel, Ferry Reach, links the harbour with another opening to the Atlantic Ocean and the picturesque Castle Harbour.

== History ==
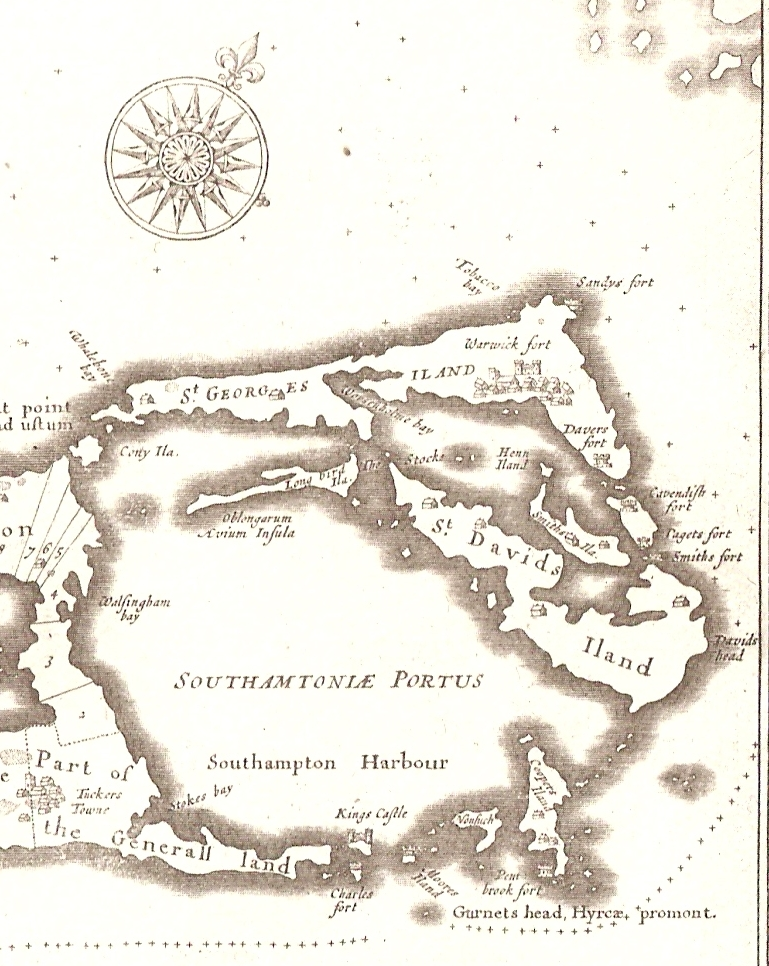
The Parish of St. George's, in 1676. The enclosed harbour to the North-East is St. George's Harbour, that to the South-West is Castle Harbour (originally Southampton Harbour).

The original channel used by shipping to access the harbour lies to the south of Paget Island. This was replaced a century ago by dredging out the passage to the north of Paget Island. At the time, the dredging of that passage had been necessary for St. George's to remain a viable port as steam replaced sail (permission for the dredging had to be granted by the Secretary of State for Defence as it would have enabled easier landing of an invading force. approval for this project, and for American investment into the Princess Hotel, was withheld 'til the Parliament of Bermuda agreed to raise a part-time reserve for the British army units in Bermuda). Most freight, today, is offloaded at Hamilton, but St. George's is still used for offloading of gravel and other consignments, by cruise ships visiting the Old Town, and it is the only port of entry for yachts, which must clear H.M. Customs and Bermuda Immigration at Ordnance Island before visiting other parts of the archipelago.

To enter St. George's Harbour, sailors must fly a yellow quarantine flag, and navigate the ship towards the Customs dock. Boaters who don't bring their vessel through customs will be fined. Before passing through Bermuda customs, visitors must declare all medicines, and cannot bring fruits or vegetables into the country. Animals are only allowed to be brought to Bermuda if they have proof of health and a permit from the Bermuda Department of Environmental Protection.

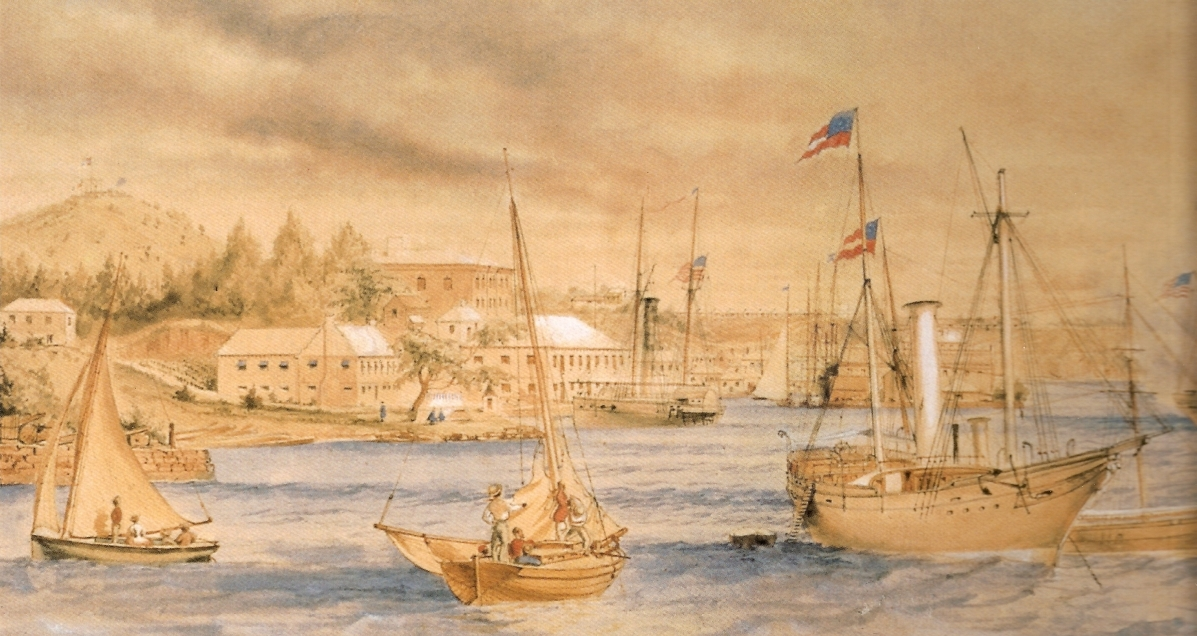
St. George's Harbour, ca. 1864. Confederate blockade runners are visible.

The shore of St. George's Harbour was the site of the first settlements in Bermuda, which occurred in the early 17th century. The crew and passengers of the Sea Venture, driven onto the reefs off St. Catherine's Point in 1609, stayed on St. George's Island for nearly a year. When most departed, two men remained behind on Smith's Island, where a third rejoined them, later. When the first intentional settlers arrived from England in 1609, they settled very briefly on St. David's Island, before moving across the Harbour to create St. George's, the oldest continuously-inhabited English settlement in the New World. The harbour was well fortified during this time, as can still be seen in the several period forts located nearby.

The 19th Century saw the establishment of a Royal Naval base in Bermuda. Initially this was in St. George's Harbour, with the Royal Navy operating from facilities in Convict Bay (so called due to the prison hulks moored there) and within St. George's town. This build up began in 1795, but a decade later, the Royal Navy was actively developing the dockyard on Ireland Island, and it soon withdrew from St. George's completely. The buildup of the dockyard at the West End of the archipelago still resulted in considerable defence infrastructure around St. George's, at the East End, however, as this was the gateway through the surrounding reefs to all of Bermuda. In addition to the 17th and 18th century forts built by the militia, there are many 19th and 20th Century forts and batteries built by the regular British Army on the islands surrounding the harbour, for which Ordnance Island was the primary ammunition depot. The various surviving East End forts, batteries and other military structures, together with the old capital, have been declared by the United Nations Educational, Scientific and Cultural Organization as a World Heritage Site, the Historic Town of St George and Related Fortifications, Bermuda.

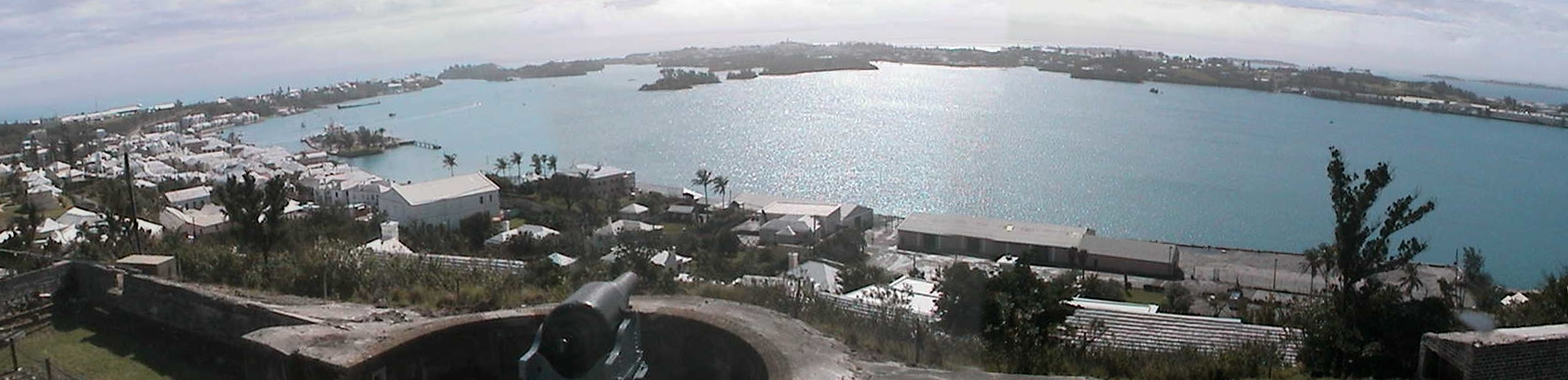
St. George's Harbour, as seen from Fort George

== See also ==
- Castle Harbour, Bermuda
- Hamilton Harbour, Bermuda
