= Military of Bermuda =

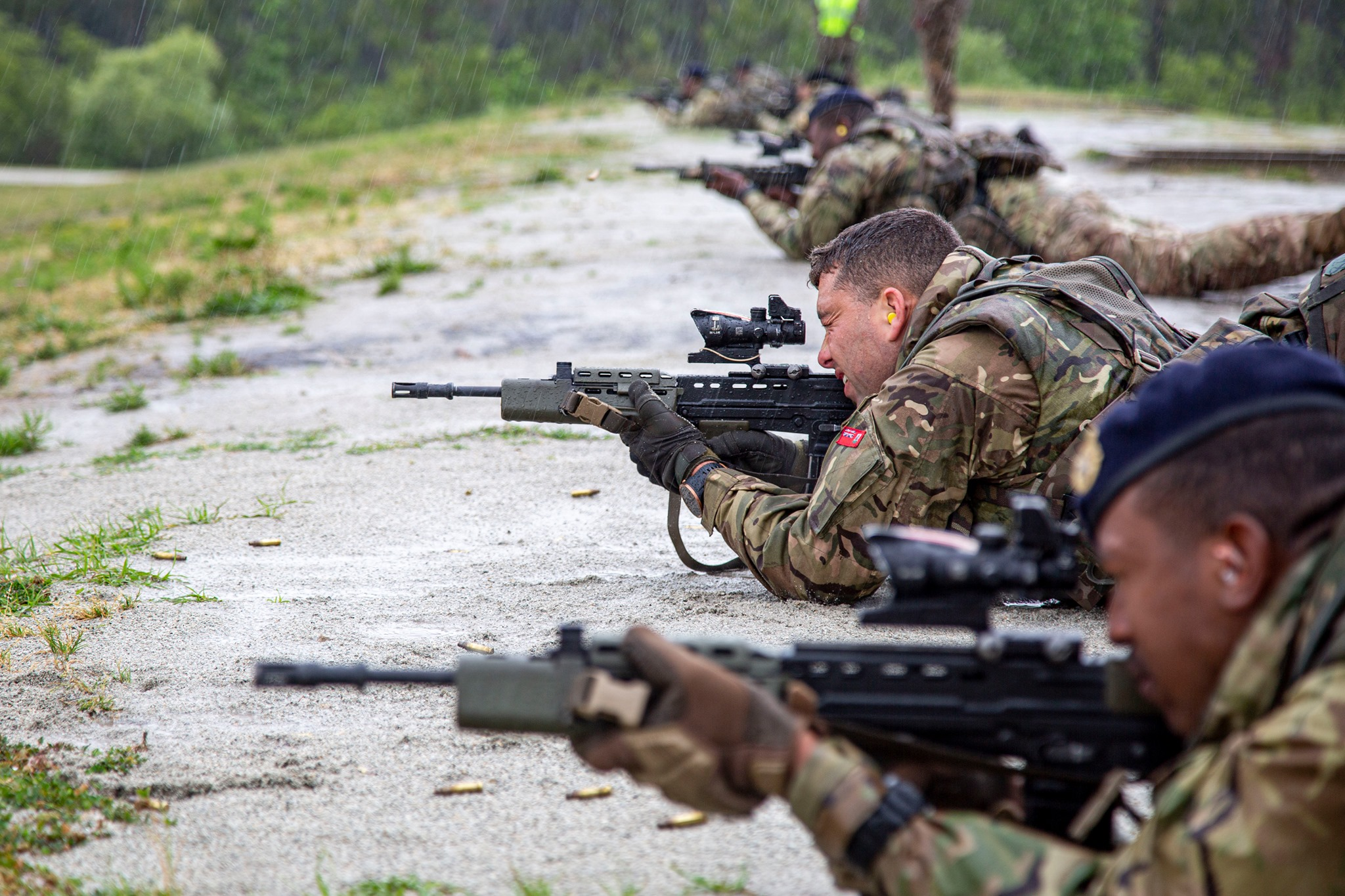
Royal Bermuda Regiment soldiers training at Camp Lejeune, May 2021

While the defence of Bermuda remains the responsibility of the government of the United Kingdom, rather than of the local Bermudian Government, the island still maintains a militia for the purpose of defence.

== History ==
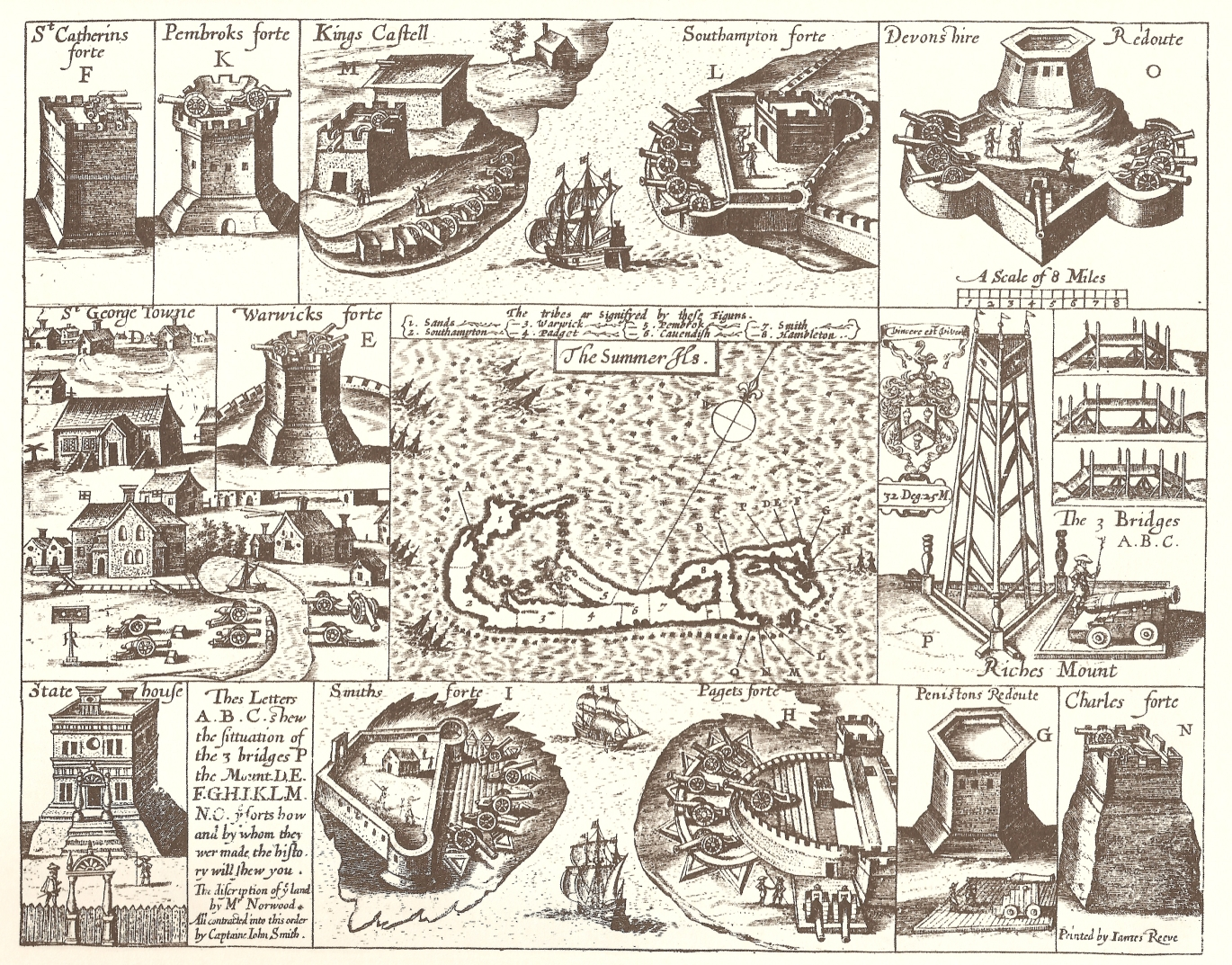
Captain John Smith's 1624 map of Bermuda, showing contemporary fortifications.

The defence of the colony against an expected Spanish attack was the first concern of the first Governor of Bermuda, Richard Moore, when he and fifty-one other settlers arrived at Bermuda aboard the Plough on the 11 July 1612, to join the three men left behind in Bermuda from the 1609 wreck of the Sea Venture. The construction of fortified coastal artillery batteries was consequently prioritised over other construction, with the artillery manned by volunteers (convicted criminals were also sometimes sentenced to serve in the batteries instead of imprisonment). A militia was also raised on the lines of the militia in England, which grew to a battalion composed of nine companies (one for each parish). All fit males between the ages of 16 and 60, whether free, indentured, or enslaved, were liable for militia service.

Bermuda tended toward the Royalist side during the English Civil War, being the first of six colonies to recognise Charles II as King on the execution of his father, Charles I, in 1649, and was one of those targeted by the Rump Parliament in An Act for prohibiting Trade with the Barbadoes, Virginia, Bermuda and Antego, which was passed on the 30 October 1650. With control of the "army" (the militia), the colony's Royalists deposed the Governor, Captain Thomas Turner, elected John Trimingham to replace him, and exiled many of its Parliamentary-leaning Independents to settle the Bahamas under William Sayle as the Eleutheran Adventurers. Bermuda's defences (coastal artillery batteries and forts, as well as its militia) were too powerful for the task force sent in 1651 by Parliament under the command of Admiral Sir George Ayscue to capture the Royalist colonies. The Parliamentary Navy was consequently forced to blockade Bermuda for several months 'til the Bermudians negotiated a peace.

Bermuda became the primary Royal Navy headquarters and dockyard in the Western Atlantic, following American independence, there was a parallel build-up of military defences to protect the naval base. Seeing the militia as having become superfluous, with the large number of regular soldiers then present, the Colonial Government allowed it to lapse after the War of 1812, however, it did raise volunteer units at the end of the century to form a reserve for the military garrison.

Following the loss of Britain's ports in thirteen of its former continental colonies after the American War of Independence, Bermuda assumed a new strategic prominence for the Royal Navy, and it became one of four Imperial fortresses. When Hamilton, a centrally located port founded in 1790, became the seat of government in 1815, it was partly resultant from the Royal Navy having invested twelve years, following American independence, in charting Bermuda's reefs. It did this in order to locate the deepwater channel by which shipping might reach the islands in, and at the West of, the Great Sound, which it had begun acquiring with a view to building a naval base. However, that channel also gave access to Hamilton Harbour. The Royal Navy had originally invested in property around St. George's, but slowly moved all of its operations to the West End once the channel had been charted. In addition to serving as a naval base and coaling station for its North America & West Indies Squadron, the Royal Navy developed Bermuda as its only dockyard between the Canadian Maritimes and the West Indies where major repairs to large vessels could be made. It was initially the winter headquarters of the Admiralty based in the Maritimes, but became the year-round headquarters during the course of the century. The blockade of the southern US Atlantic Seaboard, as well as the Burning of Washington, carried out during the War of 1812, was orchestrated from the Admiralty House in Bermuda, then located at Mount Wyndham, in Bailey's Bay, just prior to the ill-fated British assaults on Plattsburg, Baltimore and New Orleans.

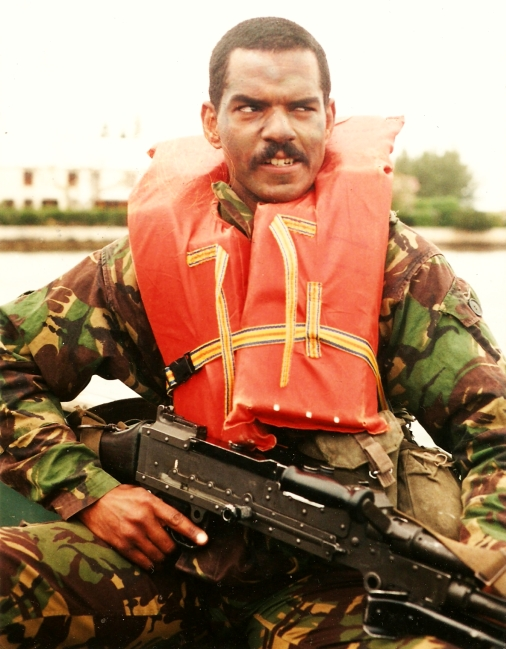
A Royal Bermuda Regiment Corporal

Prior to the American War of Independence, the only Regular Army unit in Bermuda was an Independent Company, based in St. George's. With the buildup of the Royal Naval establishment in the first decades of the nineteenth century, a large number of military fortifications and batteries were constructed, and the numbers of regular infantry, artillery, and support units that composed the British Army garrison were steadily increased. The investment into military infrastructure by the War Office proved unsustainable, and poorly thought-out, with far too few artillery men available to man the hundreds of guns emplaced. Rapid technological advance in artillery rendered many of the forts obsolete before they were completed, and several were abandoned, or removed from use, soon after construction. Following the Crimean War, the trend was towards reducing military garrisons in colonies like Bermuda, partly for economic reasons, and partly as it became recognised that the Royal Navy's own ships could provide a better defence for the Dockyard, and Bermuda. Still, the important strategic location of Bermuda meant that the withdrawal, which began, at least in intent, in the 1870s, was carried out very slowly over several decades, continuing until after the Great War. The last Regular Army units were not withdrawn until the Dockyard itself closed in the 1950s. In the 1860s, however, the major build-up of naval and military infrastructure brought vital money into Bermuda at a time when its traditional (cedar- and sail cloth-based) maritime industries were giving way under the assault of steel hulls and steam propulsion. The American Civil War, also, briefly, provided a shot-in-the-arm to the local economy. Tourism and agricultural industries would develop in the latter half of the nineteenth century, however, it was defence infrastructure that formed the central platform of the economy into the twentieth century.

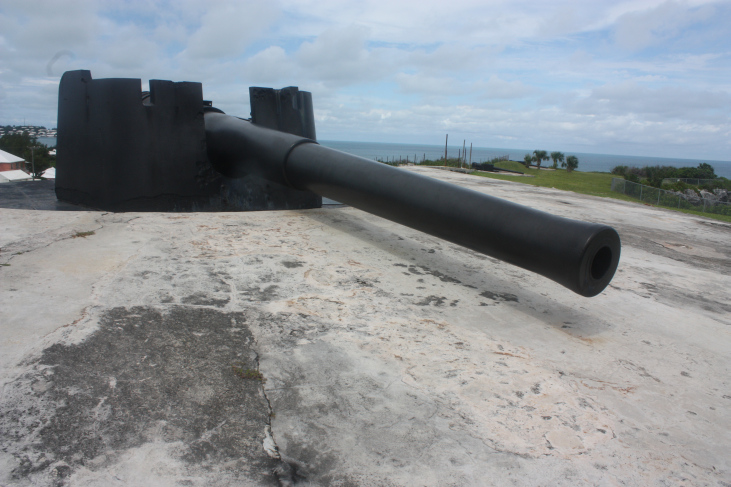
The defunct St. David's Battery (also known as the "Examination Battery"), on St. David's Island, in 2011

The Colony's prominence as a naval station was underlined during both world wars thanks of its location in the North Atlantic Ocean, its naturally-protected waters, and the presence of the Royal Naval Dockyard and its military defences. With the US, the primary threat to Bermuda in the nineteenth century, becoming an ally in both wars, US forces began to make use of Bermuda also.

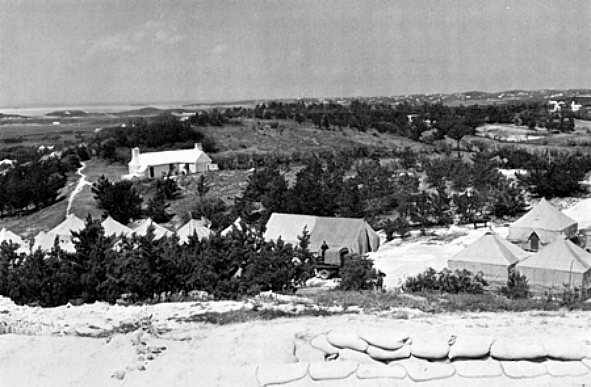
US Army battery at Turtle Hill, within Warwick Camp, Bermuda in WWII

The US had operated a US Naval station on the island during the latter stages of the World War I to serve anti-submarine vessels crossing to the European war zone, and US Navy vessels had also used the island, which was a hub for trans-Atlantic convoys. This involvement of the allied US forces in Bermuda was built upon in the Second World War. Before the USA had entered that conflict, the British Government had granted it a free, 99-year base lease in Bermuda, along with a similar grant in Newfoundland for what became the Ernest Harmon Air Force Base. These grants were an extension of the Destroyers-for-bases deal agreement, but not actually part of it in that no loan of ships or other war material was received in return (although the agreement for the airfield to be constructed in Bermuda was that it be shared with the Royal Air Force). The US Army and the US Navy both began construction of air stations (an airfield and a flying boat station, respectively) in 1941, along with coast artillery batteries, and the USA operated these bases until the end of the Cold War. The bases consisted of 5.8 km^{2} (2.2 sq mi) of land, largely reclaimed from the sea. From 1941 through 1945 the Bermuda Base Command coordinated the US Army's air, anti-aircraft, and coast artillery assets in Bermuda.

The US bases were not the only, or even the first, air stations operating in Bermuda, however. The civil airport, a flying boat station on Darrell's Island, was taken over by the RAF at the start of the war, and used by two commands. The government airline, Imperial Airways/BOAC, which had operated Darrell's Island before the war, adopted its war time role, and its camouflaged flying boats maintained trans-Atlantic service through Bermuda throughout the war. US Navy aircraft also briefly operated from Darrell's Island, maintaining anti-submarine air patrols, before their own base was operational. Before the US entry into the war, anti-submarine air patrols were flown on an ad-hoc basis by the Walrus flying boats of the Royal Navy's Fleet Air Arm, operating from its own base on Boaz Island.

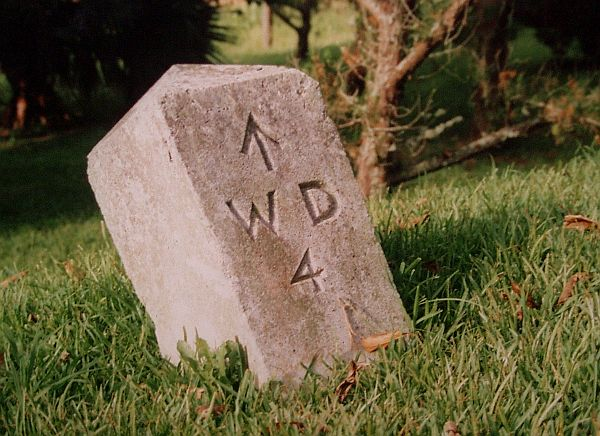
War Department Ordnance Survey Marker, Bermuda.

With the buildup of the US bases on the island, the enduring alliance post-war, under NATO, Britain's re-assessment of its global military role and responsibilities in light of subsequent break up of the British Empire, and its near bankruptcy from the cost of the war, the value placed on the Imperial bases in Bermuda rapidly diminished on the end of the conflict. However, the air bases remained in operation long after the war. Also, from 1954 to 1995 the US Navy operated a submarine-detecting SOSUS station designated Naval Facility Bermuda in a former Army coast artillery bunker at Tudor Hill.

The Royal Naval dockyard and the attendant military garrison were closed during the 1950s. A small supply base, HMS Malabar, continued to operate within the Dockyard until it, too, was closed, along with the American and Canadian bases, in 1995. The US bases closed on 1 September of that year, but unresolved issues—primarily related to environmental factors—delayed the formal return of the base lands to the Government of Bermuda, which finally occurred in 2002. The only military unit remaining in Bermuda, today, is the Royal Bermuda Regiment, an amalgam of the voluntary units formed in the 19th century, and army and naval cadet corps.

== Naval and Military branches ==
- The Royal Bermuda Regiment
- Royal Bermuda Regiment Coast Guard Unit
- Bermuda Police Service
- Bermuda Reserve Police
- Airport Security Police
- Bermuda Cadet Corps
- Bermuda Sea Cadet Corps

=== Defunct or amalgamated ===
- Bermuda Militia Artillery
- Bermuda Volunteer Rifle Corps
- Bermuda Volunteer Engineers
- Bermuda Militia Infantry
- Bermuda Home Guard

Military expenditures 2005/06 (Revised) – dollar figure: $5,687,000 (Defence), $50,467,000 (Police).

Military expenditures – per cent of GDP: 0.11 NA% (Not including Police).

Military – note: defence of Bermuda is the responsibility of the United Kingdom

Adapted from the CIA World Factbook 2000.

See also Government of Bermuda Budget Statement 2006/07 (pdf file).

== Historical naval and military bases and establishments of Bermuda ==
- Bermudian Privateering
- Royal Naval Dockyard Bermuda, and the Royal Navy in Bermuda 1795–1995.
- Royal Naval Air Station Bermuda 1939–1943.
- Corps of Colonial Marines. 1814–1816.
- Castle Islands Fortifications
- British Army, Bermuda Garrison. 1701–1957.
- Bermuda Militia. 1612–1815.
- St. George's Garrison
- Prospect Camp
- Warwick Camp
- Boaz Island and Watford Island (British Army base)
- Ordnance Island
- Agar's Island
- Locally raised Militia, Volunteer and Territorial Army Units. 1894–1965.
- Royal Air Force, RAF Darrell's Island. 1939–1945.
- Royal Air Force, Kindley Field. 1943–1945
- Royal Canadian Navy, HMCS Somers Isles. 1944–1945.
- Royal Canadian Navy, Naval Radio Station Bermuda, Daniel's Head. 1961–1968.
- Canadian Forces, Canadian Forces Station Bermuda, Daniel's Head. 1968–1993.

=== Former US Bases In Bermuda ===
- United States Naval Station, Base 24, on White's Island, Bermuda. First World War.
- United States Naval Supply Station, Bermuda at Agar's Island. First World War.
- US Naval Operating Base, Naval Air Station Bermuda, and Naval Air Station Bermuda Annex (Southampton Parish). 1941–1995.
- United States Navy Submarine Base, Ordnance Island. Second World War.
- United States Navy, Naval Facility Bermuda. (Tudor Hill) 1954–1995.
- Bermuda Base Command, US Army. 1941–1945.
- United States Army, Fort Bell. 1941–1948.
- United States Army Air Forces, Kindley Field. 1943–1948.
- United States Air Force, Kindley Air Force Base. 1948–1970.
- United States Naval Air Station Bermuda (St. George's Parish) (originally Kindley Field). 1970–1995.
- United States Coast Guard Air-Sea Rescue, at Naval Station Bermuda and Kindley AFB
- National Air and Space Administration, at Kindley AFB/US NAS Bermuda

== See also ==
- Imperial fortress
- Bermudians in the Canadian Expeditionary Force
- Bermudians Against the Draft
