= CFS Bermuda =

Canadian Forces Station in Bermuda

- Bermuda

Site information
- Controlled by: Royal Canadian Navy

Location
- Coordinates: 32°18′21″N 64°52′45″W

Site history
- In use: 1963 – 1992

Canadian Forces Station Bermuda, commonly shortened to CFS Bermuda and popularly known as Daniel's Head (due to its location on Daniel's Head), was a Canadian Forces Station in Bermuda that was operational from 1963 until 1992. Daniel's Head and Daniel's Island had previously been used by the militia, the regular army, and the Royal Navy. A previous Canadian base, HMCS Somers Isles, had existed during the Second World War.

== NRS Bermuda ==
The Royal Canadian Navy (RCN) established a temporary training base in the Imperial fortress colony of Bermuda (also called the Somers Isles) during the latter part of World War II. From 1944 to 1945, the RCN operated a shore facility named HMCS Somers Isles from the former Royal Navy base at Convict's Bay, St. George's (which had been transferred to the War Office to be joined to the adjacent St. George's Garrison after the Royal Navy had relocated to Bermuda's West End in the 19th Century). HMCS Somers Isles closed in 1945 following the end of World War II.

The RCN departure from Bermuda was short lived as a result of the growing tensions of the Cold War. In 1951 most of the Royal Naval Dockyard, Bermuda was closed, leaving the South Yard to operate as a supply base, HMS Malabar, until it closed in 1995.

The RCN returned to Bermuda, taking over part of the former RN property and creating a winter training installation. More than 30 RCN warships and 5,000 sailors trained in Bermuda during the 1950s.

A satellite of the Royal Naval Dockyard was a parcel of Admiralty land at Daniel's Head, on Somerset Island, part of which was purchased in 1809 and the rest in 1914 and 1915 for a Royal Naval Wireless Telegraphy station. In 1961 the RCN established a HFDF receiver facility at Daniel's Head, and on 1 January 1963, Daniel's Head was transferred from the Royal Navy to the Royal Canadian Navy when the RCN facility became operational. The RCN also built a transmitter facility on Ireland Island North, using a former Royal Navy wireless station that operated between 1939 and 1949. Both the receiver and transmitter facilities were operated during the 1960s as Naval Radio Station Bermuda or NRS Bermuda.

From 1944 until 1968, the Bermuda installations would be the only RCN facilities outside Canada. From 1968 to 1992 it was one of three CF locations outside Canada.

== CFS Bermuda ==
On 1 February 1968, the Royal Canadian Navy, Royal Canadian Air Force and the Canadian Army were merged to form the unified Canadian Forces.

The following year in 1969 saw NRS Bermuda renamed to Canadian Forces Station Bermuda (CFS Bermuda) and the facility came under the control of Communication Command.

CFS Bermuda underwent expansion during the 1970s and 1980s with additional buildings and structures. The end of the Cold War saw the Government of Canada announce the closure of all overseas Canadian Forces bases and stations; CFB Lahr and CFB Baden-Soellingen in West Germany and CFS Bermuda were slated for closure and repatriation of units and personnel to Canada.

CFS Bermuda closed in 1992, much to the dismay of many CF personnel who enjoyed their posting to the location. Many buildings and structures were removed from the property and the lease was terminated with the Government of Bermuda (the remaining British and US naval bases in Bermuda closed in 1995).

The former base is now home to the 9 Beaches resort and Daniel's Head Beach Park, which opened in August 2000.

== Facilities ==
=== Ireland Island ===
- Permanent DF antenna
- Temporary mobile HFDF trailer and mobile auxiliary power unit

=== Daniel's Head on Somerset Island ===
Some of the buildings were left behind by the RN and others added by Canadian Forces during their stay:

- Operations/Stores Building
- Administration Building – converted from old Royal Navy Operations Building
- Technical Workshop
- Stores Building
- Office-in-Charge Residence – c. 1940s
- Barracks Block
- Mess and Recreation Building
- Dormitory
- Tool Shed
- Transmitter Building
- Generator Building – Diesel
- Inflammable Store
- Transmitter
  - 2 AN/FRT39D 10 kW Single Sideband high frequency on Ireland Island
- Canex building
- Commanding Officer's official residence at "Mara Leah"
- CE workshop
- Longtail Barracks
- Cycle Shelter
- Beach Canteen and the Sailing Club boat house
- Senior Ranks Mess
- Junior Ranks Mess
- VIP Suite
- Community Centre
