= Pollution at Morgan's Point (Bermuda) =

Environmental issue in Bermuda

Morgan's Point is a peninsula in Bermuda that was formerly the site of the United States Naval Air Station Bermuda Annex. The area was created between 1941 and 1943 through land reclamation by the U.S. Navy, joining Morgan’s Island, Tucker’s Island, and the Main Island to form what was initially known as Naval Operating Base Bermuda. The installation operated as a joint surface vessel and seaplane base and later served as an annex to the Naval Air Station Bermuda following the decline of seaplane use in the 1970s. The base remained in operation until 1995, when it was closed as part of broader post–Cold War military drawdowns, and control of the land was returned to the Government of Bermuda. The U.S. Navy’s lease, originally set for 99 years, was ended prematurely.

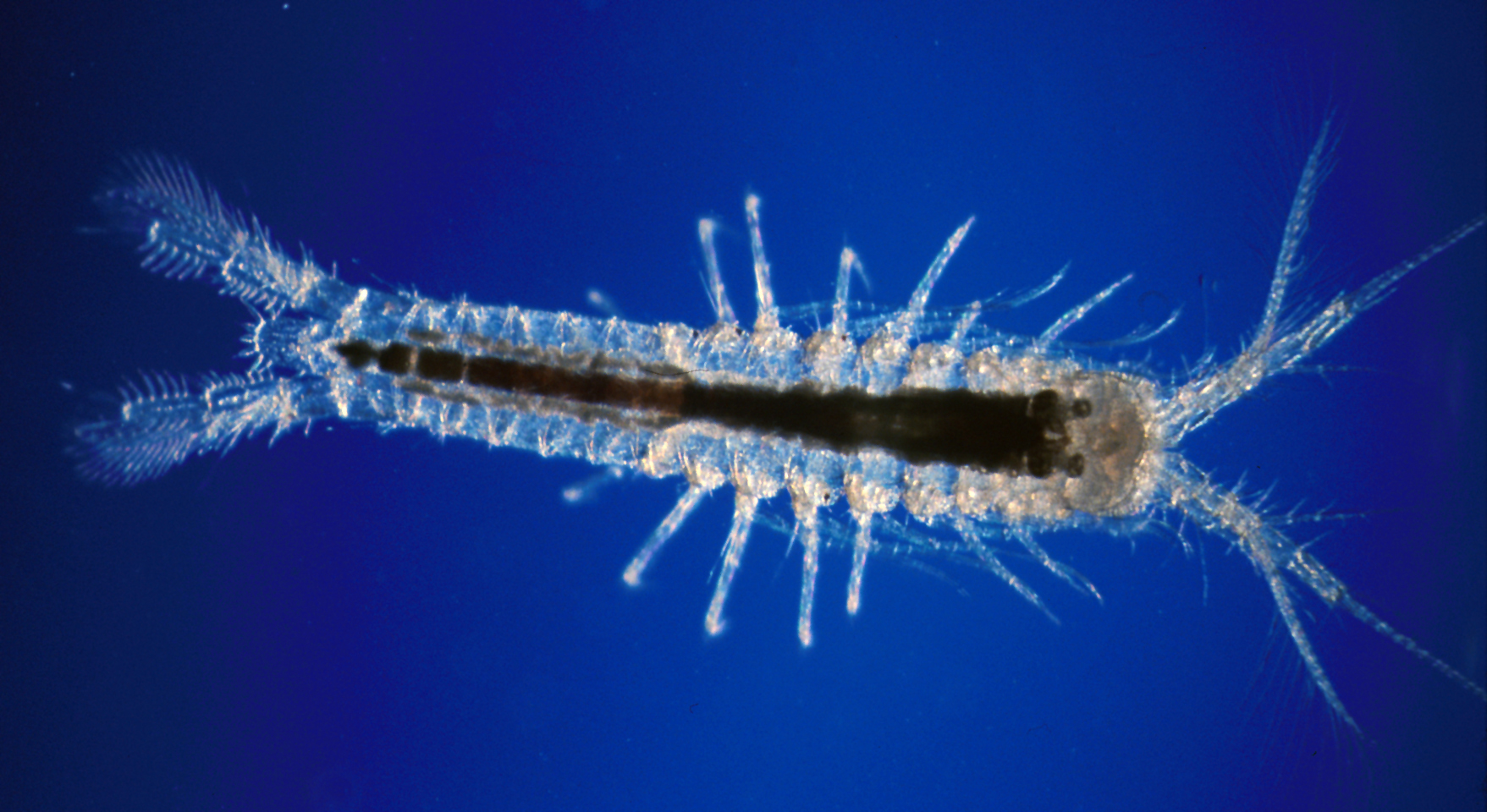
Mictocaris halope is critically endangered due to population fragmentation, a decline in subpopulations, and only inhabiting a single location. The population is only extant in five locations, some of which are experiencing habitat destruction

== Discovery of pollution ==
In 2002, a confidential report prepared by Bermuda’s Department of Environmental Protection (under the Ministry of the Environment) estimated that approximately 520,000 gallons of oil and several tons of untreated sewage had been discharged into Bassett’s Cave, located within the former base. The report also documented the presence of an additional 55,000 gallons of jet fuel located underground approximately 200 feet (61 metres) from the cave.

The base, which had operated largely independently from local governance and infrastructure, reportedly lacked comprehensive waste disposal planning during its period of activity. Since the contamination was identified, remediation efforts have been limited, and access to the site has remained restricted. Due to concerns about the potential environmental risks posed by disturbing the cave system, particularly the possibility of spreading pollutants, proposed redevelopment of the area has been delayed or suspended.

== Current status ==
As of the 2010s and 2020s, development plans for Morgan’s Point have been periodically discussed but remain contentious due to the environmental legacy of the former base. The site continues to be monitored, though no large-scale cleanup had been initiated as of the latest publicly available reports.

== Damage to the caves ==
Often described as a "biodiversity hotspot", the isolation of these caves for thousands of years has led to the formation of 75 endemic stygobitic species (including 6 species of shrimp), 25 of which are considered critically endangered. Beyond their value as unique organisms, their total isolation provides an exceptional biological microcosm fit for study which could yield "unfathomed benefits", particularly in regards to the formation and evolution of moderately complex organisms. Bassett's Cave is now so heavily polluted that nothing lives in its water, but some people fear that unless the pollution is cleaned up it may spread further into the island's cave system and damage currently pristine habitats.

The caves also serve as a geological record, detailing the formation of the islands since the end of the last ice age and the Pleistocene Epoch. The intricate systems, few of which have been explored and even fewer mapped, offer clues to Bermuda's geological past that may be forever erased should the oil spread deep into the caves. On an island infatuated with its heritage, the loss of its natural past would certainly be tragic.

== Potential damage to the water supply ==
The oil and fuel to Bermuda's water supply comes with a better defined cost. The majority of Bermuda's potable water is collected by each household, using the roof as a water catchment (treated with lime or non-toxic paint to keep the water as clean as possible) rainwater is funneled in tanks under every house. By law a house must collect 80 percent of the water that falls on its roof. However, residents of apartment buildings must find another source of fresh water on the island. There are no natural rivers, springs, or freshwater ponds, but the peculiar geology of the island had led to the formation of four underground "lenses" of freshwater where rainwater has permeated the limestone island and been caught on the impermeable volcanic rock beneath. These lenses, being the only viable source of water for all commercial and industrial uses and for the domestic use of thousands of residents living in apartment and condominium complexes, are pumped for 1.5 million gallons of fresh water a day. During times of drought when house tanks are running dry this water is sold and delivered at roughly $60 per 1000 gallon truckload, giving it a value of $90,000 per day, and a present value of over $500 million, depending on the long-term interest rate.

While the oil has remained somewhat contained within Bassett's Cave for at least the last 10 years, it is feared that the cave will not hold the pollution indefinitely. Hurricanes are the primary fear, as one of significant strength with winds from the north may be able to rupture the cave and release its contents. Without providing an exact estimate the Ministry of the Environment has deemed the probability of this event to be significant and has urged that action be taken to secure the pollutants. In addition Dr. Kent Simmons, chief scientist in charge of environmental programs at the Bermuda Biological Station for Research, notes that some amount of oil has already seeped into the ground water and is migrating

=== Alternative water sources ===
Should the oil and fuel escape from their caves, the Ministry of Environment deems it probable that the underground freshwater lens would be contaminated and undrinkable. The destruction of the two West-End lenses would cut the supplemental pumped supply by 2/5, creating catastrophic water shortages in the summer months, and forcing both severe water conservation programs and investment in another source of fresh water to meet the highly inelastic demand. The only foreseen alternative is a desalination or reverse osmosis plant, the most efficient of which can provide fresh water at $2000 per acre foot ($1.60/kL). However, when one considers that the price of energy in Bermuda is 6.3 times as high as it is in the USA (a function of Bermuda having no domestic energy source), that there is no natural resource or heavy industry to provide supplemental heat, and that with a population of only 65,000 the plant could not utilize economies of scale, it seems probable that costs could exceed $25,000 per acre foot (7.5 cents per gallon)(See domestic energy prices offered by. For comparison, and). Furthermore, it is difficult to predict the capital cost of a desalination plant, as such plants typically produce millions of gallons per day and facilities as small as that which Bermuda would require are difficult to find for comparisons. Given the cost of labor, unskilled construction at $20/hour; the cost of imported construction materials, as all construction materials are imported; the value of property at over $200 per square foot); and the total lack of piping infrastructure it is clear that the initial cost of a desalination or reverse osmosis plant would be crippling.

== Costs of inaction ==
On top of the threat of one of the islands primary water sources is an opportunity cost to not abating the pollution. The land cannot be developed in its current state as significant construction of any kind would likely disturb the oil filled cave and contaminate the underground freshwater lens. The commercial value of the 25-acre (100,000 m^{2}) site, should it be open for development, is not trivial. Currently all bids have remained private, the details known only to the developers and Government officials, but most real estate professionals estimate that bids are ranging from $30 to $50 million.

== Cost of abatement ==
The cost of the pollution cleanup has remained largely unknown, making potential investors somewhat fearful that any contract they sign may come with massive hidden costs. However, the best estimate of cleanup costs comes from an internal report of a study conducted by the Department of Environmental Protection in 2002. Dr. Tom Sleeter, director of the Department of Environmental Protection reports that the cleanup is estimated to cost $14.75 million over the course of 24 months.

== Proposed development ==
Hundreds of homes, a new hotel and a championship golf course are all on the drawing board for Morgan's Point, under a proposed development.
