= Morgan's Island, Bermuda =

Morgan's Island is the name of two places in Bermuda

- Morgan's Island, Ely's Harbour, Bermuda
- Morgan's Island, Great Sound, Bermuda, now part of the Morgan's Point Peninsula.
