= Luis Manuel Bernardo =

Bermudian politician (1936–2021)

Luis Manuel Bernardo MBE (1936–2021) was the chairman of the United Bermuda Party, and a member of the Marine and Air Board of Bermuda.
