= 9 Beaches =

Defunct holiday resort in Bermuda

Coordinates: 32°18′14″N 64°52′42″W

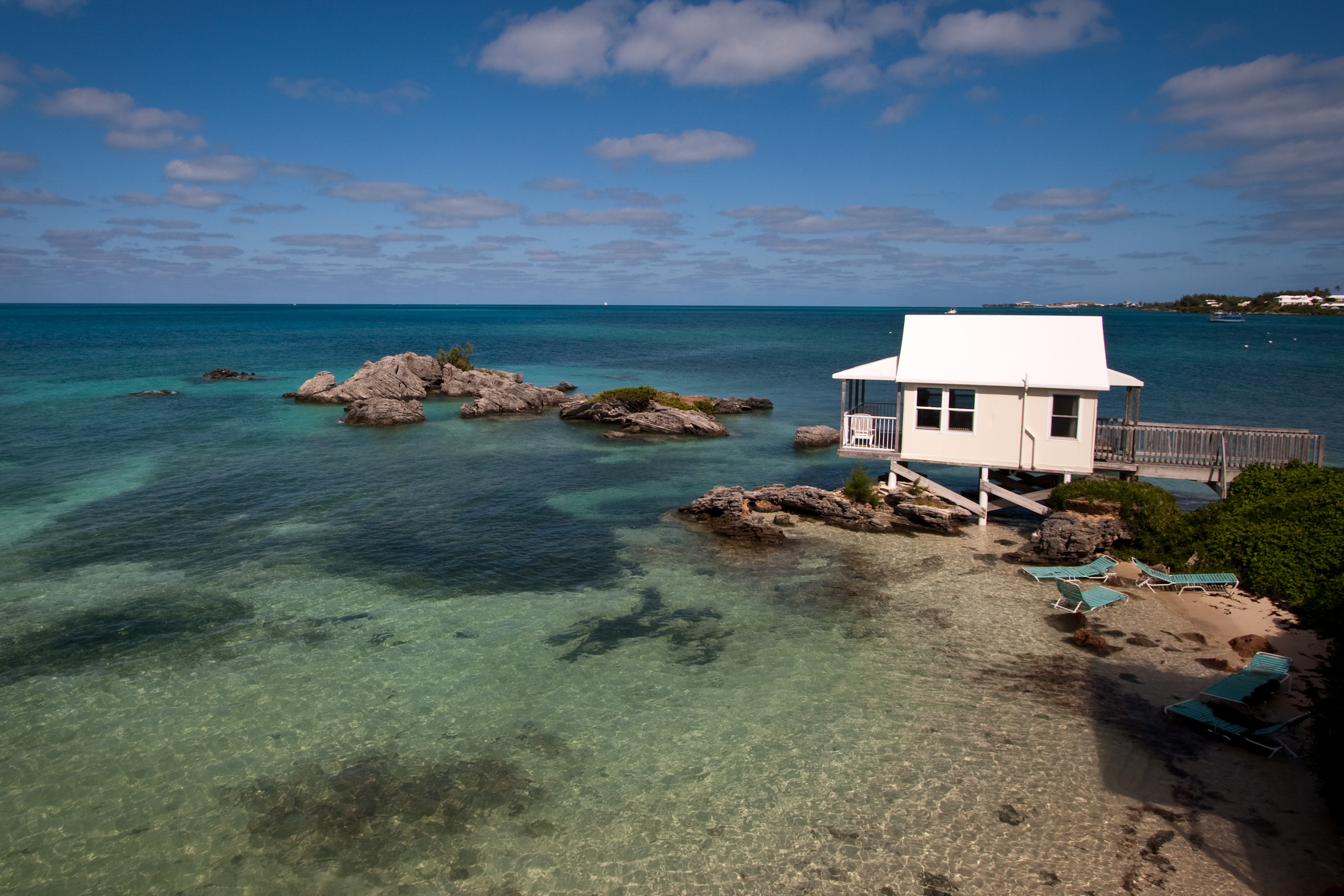
A cabin at the resort, in 2009

9 Beaches was a resort in Sandys Parish on the west end of Bermuda featuring access to nine beaches. This was historically Admiralty land (a satellite of the Royal Naval Dockyard), part of which was purchased in 1809 with more acquired in 1914 and 1915 for a Wireless Telegraphy station, and was transferred from the Royal Navy to the Royal Canadian Navy (later the Canadian Forces) in 1963. The station (by then known as CFS Bermuda) closed in 1995 and the property was earmarked for tourism use.

The resort closed down in 2010 for renovation, but plans for an $80 million restoration were unable to secure financing. In 2017, the few remainings resident squatters were evicted.

== Resort ==
The resort, which billed itself as "ultra casual", had 84 cottage tent style cabanas on stilts for rooms, many of them wading out into the Atlantic Ocean (the substantial naval buildings on the property were ignored in redeveloping it as visitor accommodation). All rooms had a direct view of the water and many feature Plexiglas floors to allowing viewing of the ocean below. The resort featured simple amenities in a natural setting. Rooms did not have telephones or televisions, but guests were given complimentary cell phones upon arrival. Wireless internet is also available. Bathrooms were small, with showers, but no bathtubs. The resort was considered eco-friendly, employing solar panels and local plant landscaping.

9 Beaches had a formal restaurant called Hi Tide, a bar and grill called Dark N'Stormy, and a "takeout shack". Breakfast was included in the cost of the room. A surf shack on the property offered a variety of mostly water-based activities. Some of the more exotic activities offered included a floating climbing wall, kite boarding, and trampolining.

The property consisted of 18 acres, most of them beach front property. Approximately 100 feet off shore is a rocky outcrop known as Daniel's Head Island.

== History ==
In August 2004, Island Resort Collection (IRC) bought the defunct Daniel's Head Village and soon announced plans to spend $4.5 million renovating the property. They decided to target 25- to 40-year-old tourists and locals with a fun casual resort. The resulting resort, 9 Beaches, opened in April 2005.

Despite an extensive advertising campaign, 9 Beaches failed to gain traction in its first year. Occupancy rates ran under 50% in the business' first summer and by late summer had dipped to 30-40%. In September, some staff were laid off amid other cost-cutting measures. In a last-ditch effort to save the remainder of the season, rates were cut substantially. The move worked and occupancy rates nearly doubled. Local Bermudians using the facility generated a significant portion of the increased business. Lack of air-conditioning, poor customer service, and unpleasant odors emanating from a nearby dairy farm were cited as contributing factors to the rough first year.

The resort was closed for the winter and management worked to address problems. Laid off staff who were the "most enthusiastic for the success of the resort" were rehired and a staff training program was introduced (previously staff received no formal training). Air conditioning was installed. Marketing was refocused to emphasize that the resort offered an entertainment package consisting of primarily outdoor activity, not a traditional hotel environment. An increased emphasis on attracting locals was also adopted. As a result, business picked up significantly. Revenue was up 65% in 2006 and by 2007 revenue was double 2005 levels.

In 2008, 9 Beaches revamped its food and evening entertainment. Chef Joseph Dolby, who trained at a 5-star resort, was hired to create an "eclectic, ever-changing menu with internationally inspired modern cuisine". Live music was added, as was an all-you-can eat buffet. United States media coverage soon followed. During 2008, 9 Beaches was featured on the cover of Islands Magazine, The Boston Globe's Sunday Travel Magazine, Travel + Leisure Family and Arthur Frommer's Budget Travel Magazine. The resort was also profiled on The Today Show. As a result, occupancy increased, and hotel manager Robin Gilbert declared the resort was quickly becoming Bermuda's "cover girl". While Bermuda tourism was down overall, 9 Beaches reported record occupancy rates and revenues. Guest feedback was also strong, as the resort climbed to the island's fifth most popular hotel on TripAdvisor.com.

In 2009, 9 Beaches began offering eco-chic weddings. These ceremonies include organic champagne, organic cake, and decorations made of local seashells. Couples plant a Bermuda cedar as part of the ceremony.

In May 2010, it was announced that 9 Beaches would close for major renovations. The original plan was to spend $80 million redeveloping the property into a 150 unit mixed-use facility. The new property would feature both traditional hotel rooms, as well as leaseback units, and would feature an upgraded restaurant and new public space. The project was estimated to take 5-years to complete fully, but the resort was scheduled to reopen in 2011. Plans were later revised to call for 120 one to three bedroom dwellings for "tourism or residential use" and 69 new hotel units. It was revealed that the resort would move away from its eco-friendly orientation, which owner David Dodwell called a mistake. Stuart Hayward, chairman of Bermuda Environment and Sustainability Taskforce, was disappointed, saying "It is not encouraging that the ecotourism concept seems to have given way to a less environmentally sensitive development."

Complications with the plan arose due to 9 Beaches being located on government owned property. The government's Bermuda Land Development Company was supportive during the planning phases and a 117-year lease extension, the maximum allowable under law, was signed in July. However, IRC wanted a longer lease. A bill was introduced in the Senate to extend the maximum allowable lease period to 262 years. The bill passed on 11 December 2010. A 240-year lease was drafted and passed by the House, but delayed multiple times in the Bermuda Senate. It was finally passed in February 2011.

With development still delayed, IRC opened the property's beaches to the public during the summer of 2011. Local vendors used the opportunity to generate new business. Additionally, some of 9 Beaches accommodations were rented out to ensure "people [were] always buzzing around" the resort.

In 2017, the few remainings resident squatters were evicted.

== Reputation ==
In 2005, 9 Beaches was named to Coastal Living magazine's list of 15 best waterfront inns off the American Coast. The magazine called staying at 9 Beaches an "ethereal experience".

The resort was visited by Fred Bernstein of The New York Times in 2006, who gave it a mixed review. Initially his visit was unpleasant due to a "pungent odor of the neighboring dairy farm and slaughterhouse wafting across [his] cabin." However, after complaining, he was upgraded to a room on the other side of the resort with a beautiful view. He called the property "stunning" and said "with its nine beaches, you can easily have one to yourself".

Bernstein called the service "maddening", but added that "the resort’s energetic staff works hard to make up for its all-too-frequent errors." He also remarked that the room's air conditioners were "not up to the job" on the hottest days. However, he did describe the resort as a bargain noting that it was cheaper than most on the island, partially due to it being an hour from the island's airport.

Also in 2006, 9 Beaches received a positive review from Michael Gloss of Travel + Leisure. Gloss was impressed by the Plexiglas bottom cabanas remarking, "I felt ... anchored in my own private paradise of water." He said the resort featured "many charms" and arguably had the best location on Bermuda. "I spent my days wandering from beach to even prettier beach," he wrote.

Glass noted that amenities where limited, but said that he had everything he needed. He found the food at Hi Tide to be "good", and the food at the resorts informal bar "even better." Gloss' only complaint was that he was woken by an arguing couple in a nearby cabana one night, and a loud boat another night.

In 2008, the resort was visited by Elizabeth Gehrman of Boston.com. She called 9 Beaches a resort "unlike any other", noting that it brings the guest up close and personal with nature. She added that guests will be "amazed by the sense of serenity" as they fall asleep surrounded by nature. She described the price and accommodations as "mid range".

In 2009, Coastal Living featured 9 Beaches on its cover and made it number one on its list of the "10 best eco-chic resorts." The magazine said the resort had legitimate "eco-cred" and the resort's Hi Tide restaurant makes "some of the best meals on the Island".
