= Convict's Bay, Bermuda =

Convict Bay
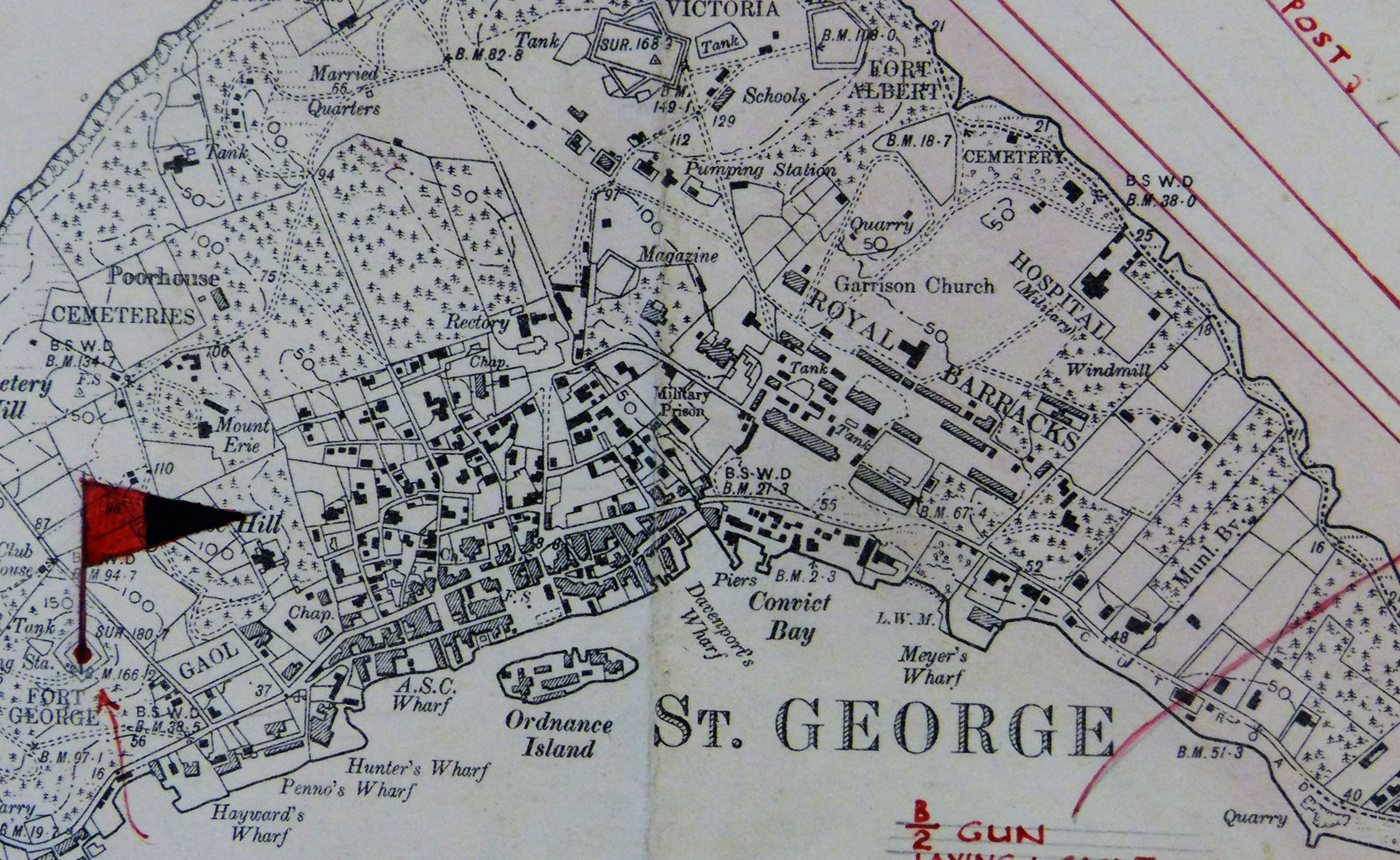
- Map of St George's Town and Garrison, including Convict Bay, ca. 1899

Site information
- Type: Royal Engineers Yard. Company offices
- Owner: War Office
- Operator: British Army

Location
- Coordinates: 32°22′49″N 64°40′25″W

Site history
- Built: 1864
- Built for: War Office
- In use: 1864–1957

Garrison information
- Garrison: St. George's Garrison, Bermuda, Bermuda Garrison
- Occupants: Royal Engineers

Convicts' Bay (better known as Convict Bay) is a bay located in St. George's Harbour on the eastern side of St. George's Town on St. George's Island, Bermuda, and near to Ordnance Island.

The bay was part of the Royal Navy base in Bermuda, which was at St. George's from 1795 through the American War of 1812, pending construction of the Royal Naval Dockyard. It was subsequently part of St. George's Garrison until the 1950s, with HMCS Somers Isles, a Royal Canadian Navy training base, established there during the Second World War.

== History ==
Convicts' Bay was named after the use of the area as a prison. The British administration used obsolete warships as floating prisons, prison hulks, in New York City during the American War of Independence and applied them to use on the island. In 1799, a hulk was towed to Somerset Island, Bermuda and one more by 1824. Several would be used at the Royal Naval Dockyard and one at Convict Bay. Convict Bay was transferred to the Army in the 1860s (along with other Admiralty properties at the East End and in the Central parishes), and the army merged the facility with the adjacent St. George's Garrison, which overlooked it, and used the bay for various purposes (initially as a Royal Engineers yard) until the Second World War. The military detachments housed there were withdrawn to make way for the Royal Canadian Navy's HMCS Somers Isles for the duration of the war. It was part of the War Office and Admiralty lands slated for disposal in the 1950s.

== Today ==
After the departure of the military from Convict Bay and the rest of St. George's Garrison, the area is now a residential neighbourhood. Streets in the area reflect the neighbourhood's past:

- Convict's Bay Lane
- Barrack Hill
- Barrack Street
- Old Military Road
- Grenadier Lane
- Red Coat Lane
