= Green wedding =

Type of wedding

A green wedding or an eco-friendly wedding, is any wedding where the couple plans to decrease the ecological impact of their special event on the planet. Couples plan their weddings by integrating eco-friendly alternatives, such as eco-friendly invitations, flowers, dresses, photography, and more.

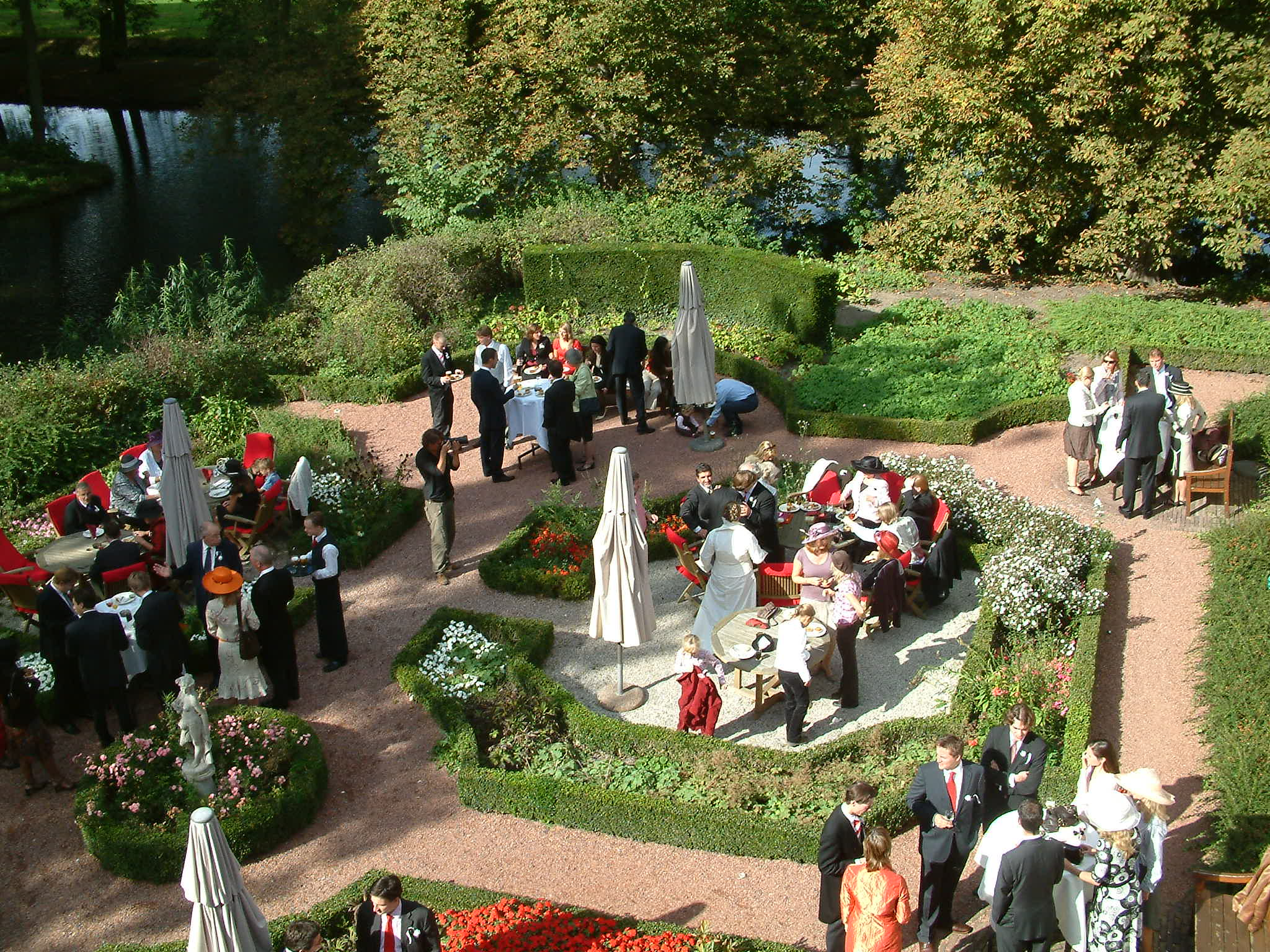
A green wedding reception

== Definition ==
A green wedding is an eco-friendly and conscious consumption of resources that would otherwise be used in a traditional wedding. Green weddings represent a new lifestyle. Compared with the extravagance and waste of traditional weddings, today's green weddings are more economical and environmentally friendly. This can include recycling waste, choosing a sustainable venue, and even neglecting to participate in traditional practices that could be considered unsustainable, such as buying rings from unethical sources. Many people who live sustainably believe it is necessary to continue the lifestyle by making sure their weddings are also sustainable. Others choose green weddings to raise awareness about how sustainability is important in daily activities and celebrations. The largest factor that contributes to the growing number of green weddings is the impact wedding celebrations can have on the environment. Many argue that without being conscious of practices and items used, the average wedding can generate a large amount of waste.

== Basic principles ==
One key concept for keeping a wedding eco-friendly is to ensure that the items being used will not quickly become waste, mainly one-time disposable items such as hosiery, plates, cups, ornaments, or wedding favors. Many green weddings have instead opted for borrowed or recycled items. Another option chosen is to rent items needed for the wedding instead of buying all new equipment/decorations to control the amount of waste that could be created. In planning a green wedding, the main basis is to prevent or reduce all harmful impacts, either directly or indirectly, on the environment. The traditional wedding produces an average 400 lbs of garbage and 63 tons of CO_{2}. Together, American weddings are equivalent to 8.3 million cars driving on the road for a year. This can include flowers, paper (invitations), textiles (dress, suits), wedding favors, gas emissions (transportation), and everything else that can occur from the wedding.

== Flowers ==
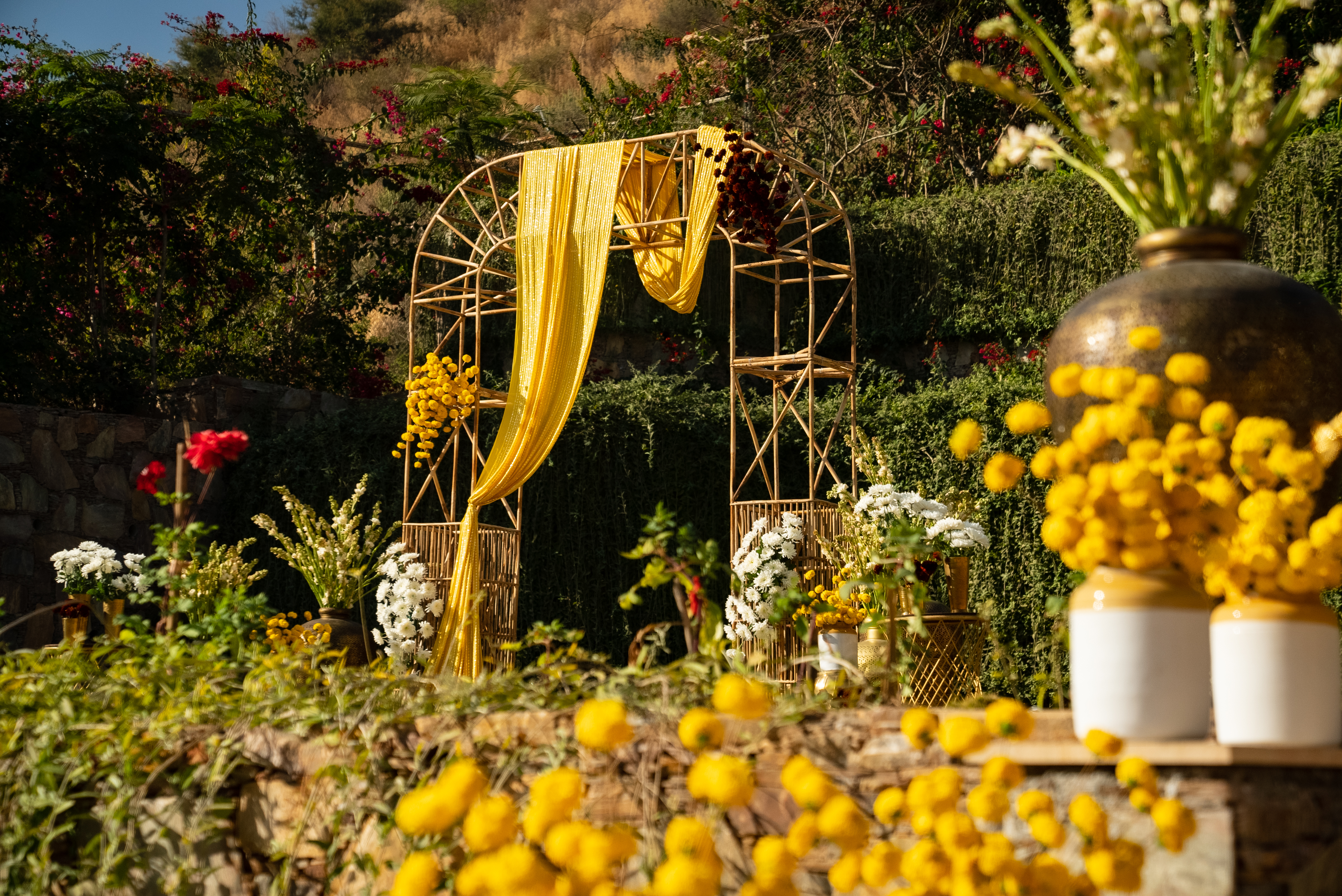
Sustainable Wedding Decor with Flowers

Another important factor of a green wedding is the picking of flowers. Flowers can add a huge impact on the environment due to fertilizers used and gas emissions that are released to transport the flowers. Many green wedding planners opt to have their flowers supplied by organic florist or even to grow their own. Another common practice is to consider what to do with the flowers after the wedding. Some weddings have had flowers that are replanted after the big day to minimize waste and allow the flowers to continue to grow afterward. Some people decorate wedding halls with potted plants without picking flowers. If they give the plant to the guests as a gift, they can grow flowers while thinking about the bride and groom.

== Invitations ==
There is a large amount of paper used in weddings throughout the entire process. One major reason paper is used is because of invitations. Green wedding planners are careful when selecting how to invite others due to the impact this can have. Some options that are more sustainable are

- Using recycled paper
- Using the internet to send out electronic invitations instead
- Using tree-free milled paper

== Wedding ring ==
Exchange of wedding ring is from the custom of Europe in the Middle Ages. But the ring manufacturing process such as gold mining causes many waste and pollution. For instance,Gold mining is one of the human activities that affect the quality of the environment. During gold mining, large quantities of toxic heavy metal laden wastes can be generated and released uncontrollably. Some options that are more sustainable are

- Using ring made by environmental friendly material such as recycled stone and metal.
- Using vintage pieces
- Using wooden rings

== Food ==
Food is one important factor that affects how sustainable a wedding is. Some planners choose to get all their food supplied by local/organic growers to help eliminate the number of chemicals that would have been used in the growing of the food or the transportation of it. Also, opting for a seasonal menu ensures the food is sustainably sourced and readily available. Wedding cakes are generally made out of all organic ingredients as well to reduce the chemicals used in the production of the ingredients. Many sustainable practices that are done in green weddings are to have the leftovers composted after or to have untouched meals donated to local charities.

Besides, entrées are also important. Compared with other meat, serving chicken as entrées is the least harmful to the environment. In some weddings, leftover food is picked up by specific organizations such as Rescuing Leftover Cuisine from these events or weddings for food donations which minimizes waste.

A 2025 carbon footprint assessment of a traditional wedding menu in Isparta, Turkey, found that animal-based ingredients were the primary contributors to greenhouse gas emissions in most of the dishes studied. The researchers suggested that incorporating more plant-based ingredients could help reduce the environmental impact of wedding catering while preserving traditional food culture.

== Attire ==
One of the biggest contributors to waste that can be generated is the wedding dress. Many argue that one of the ways to continue with a sustainable wedding is to use a dress that can be re-worn or borrowed from another. This eliminates the one-time use principle violation. Also choosing a wedding dress that is made out of organic fiber ensures that the garment had minimal impact on the environment during its production. Many green brides opt to purchase a vintage/second-hand dress and have it altered instead of buying a new dress. Other brides choose to sell or donate their dress after the wedding or have it recycled to create a new garment. There are some brands creating outfits from recycled materials, and others using environmentally friendly dyes. The popularity of green wedding outfits is confirmed by a 235% increase in 'low-waste wedding' queries in 2019 according to Printerest. Also contributing to the popularity of green weddings was Princess Beatrice during her wedding to Edoardo Mapelli Mozzi. She chose the new gown over Queen Elizabeth's Norman Hartnell gown, which Her Majesty originally wore to a gala dinner in Rome in 1961.

== Venue ==
Those who prefer an eco-friendly wedding also look for a sustainable venue to host their wedding. Many factors can minimize the waste produced by wedding venues, from eco-friendly transportation to renewable energy options. Air travel often makes up the largest share of a wedding’s carbon footprint, so minimizing total guest travel distance can substantially reduce impacts. Some prioritize reducing decoration waste by picking wedding venues surrounded by nature. The venue's size also contributes to its sustainability, which is why some of those who choose to have green weddings pick small venues. As important as other aspects of a green wedding, being conscious of where their celebration occurs can reduce the amount of waste being produced.

== See also ==
- Zero-waste event
