= Bermudians Against the Draft =

Joint action group

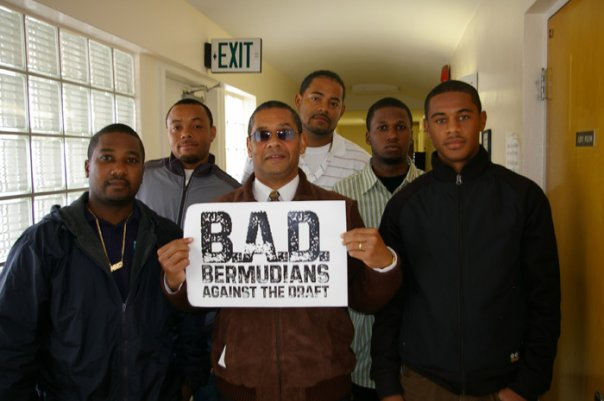
5 of the B.A.D. Conscientious Objectors with their #1 supporter, Larry Marshall Sr., B.A.D Founder, that were present at the first day of trial in Supreme Court #3, Feb 25th 2008.

Bermudians Against the Draft (B.A.D.) was a joint action group established in the British Overseas Territory of Bermuda to challenge the legality of conscription based on principles of natural justice and judicial review.

B.A.D. was formed in 2006 in response to mounting evidence that military officials in the Bermuda Defence Department and the Bermuda Regiment systematically abused their statutory powers of recruitment, mobilization and enforcement of its internal security obligations to the British Crown.

B.A.D. has defined a unique moment in the global conscientious objector movement by enabling philosophical or political dissent to the draft to become a sufficient grounds for deferral of military service.

This civil disobedience strategy was driven by the 2% doctrine espoused by renowned pacifist, Albert Einstein, who claimed that:

'In countries where conscription exists, the true pacifist must refuse military duty. In countries where compulsory military service does not exist, true pacifists must publicly declare that they will not take up arms in any circumstances... The timid may say, "What's the use? We'll be sent to prison." To them I say: even if only two per cent announced their refusal to fight, governments would be powerless – they would not dare send such a huge number to prison.'

— Albert Einstein, 1930

In accordance with this concept, B.A.D. has effectively organised some 14 complainants out of a total battalion of approximately 530 infantry conscripts to be deferred from military service, pending the outcome of a civil case questioning the legitimacy of conscription within the only land force under the British Crown to continue the draft.

B.A.D. gained support from British Member of Parliament Andrew MacKinlay for Thurrock who, in his capacity as a government backbencher sitting on the Foreign Affairs Committee, challenged the British government to justify its support for Bermuda's conscription regime.

The Supreme Court case that would adjudicate the legality of conscription was scheduled to commence on February 25, 2008 and would herald an unprecedented investigation of the traditionally conservative relationship between the United Kingdom and Bermuda, its oldest and most populated remaining colony.

In 2010 a ruling by the Privy Council in the UK went against the case of B.A.D. and upheld the laws of conscription in Bermuda.

In 2018, conscription was finally ended through the Defence Amendment Act.
