= Tucker's Island, Bermuda =

Former island of Bermuda

Coordinates: 32°16′15″N 64°51′30″W

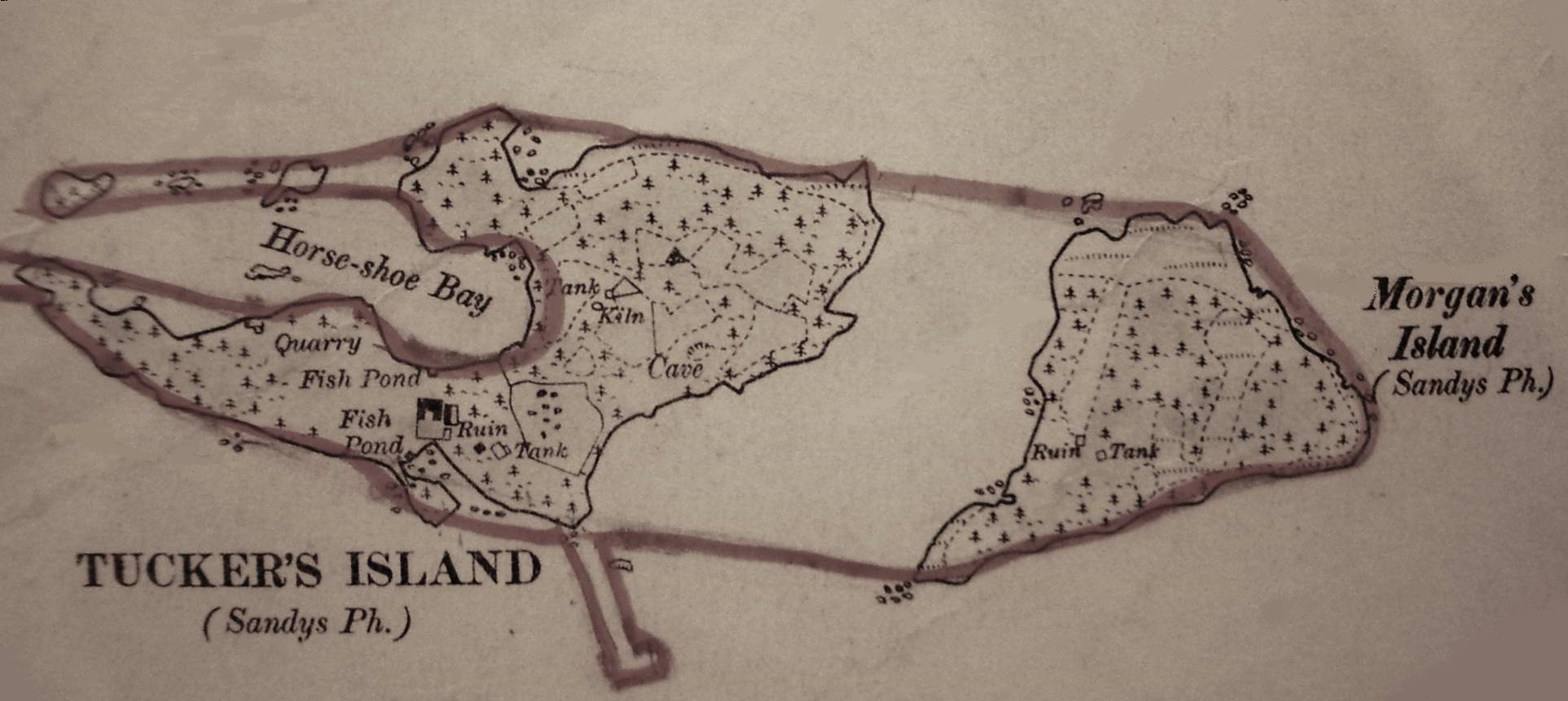
Tucker's & Morgan's Islands, Bermuda

Tucker's Island was an island of the British Overseas Territory of Bermuda. It was part of the land leased to the United States Government in 1941 for ninety-nine years for the construction of the Naval Operating Base Bermuda, a joint shipping base and naval air station. Tucker's Island was joined by infilling to nearby Morgan's Island, and the two were connected to the Main Island by a narrow infilling, creating a peninsula. The base, by then designated the Naval Air Station Bermuda Annex, was closed in 1995 along with other US bases in Bermuda. After a delay while the issue of toxic waste deposits was argued between the British/Bermudian and US Governments, the land was handed back to the Government of Bermuda and allowed to return to nature pending the clean-up of toxins and a decision on its future. The only user of the area was the Royal Bermuda Regiment, which had begun training there when it was still a US base. Following public outrage at plans to develop a Jumeirah resort hotel at Southlands, then a wooded private estate on the South Shore, the government traded the former US naval base to the developers in exchange for Southlands, most of which was designated as parkland. Morgan's Point, as the former naval base is now called, is currently being cleared to make way for the new resort.
