= Naval Air Station Bermuda =

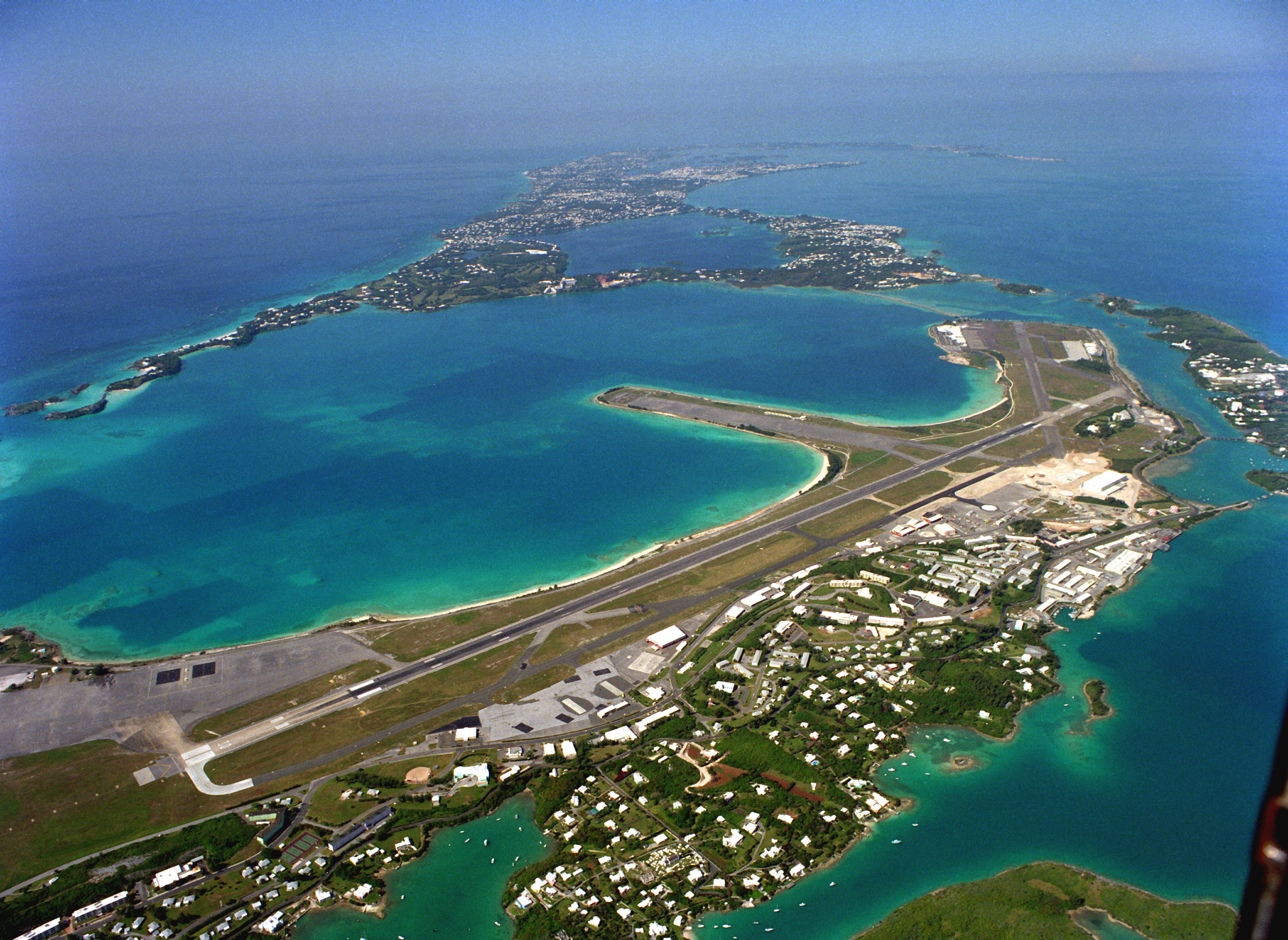
- Aerial view of NAS Bermuda, 1993.
- IATA: BDA; ICAO: TXKF

Summary
- Airport type: Military: Naval Air Station
- Operator: United States Navy
- Location: St. David's Island
- In use: 1970 - 1995
- Elevation AMSL: 12 ft (3.7 m)
- Coordinates: 32°21′51″N 064°40′43″W
- Interactive map of Naval Air Station Bermuda

Runways
Direction	Length		Surface
Direction	ft	m	Surface
12/30	9,898	3,017	Asphalt

Naval Air Station Bermuda was a United States Navy establishment in the then British Colony of Bermuda from 1940 to 1995. It operated from several locations and under different names during this period. At first, as the Naval Operating Base, it was located on Darrell's Island, in Great Sound, before moving in 1941 to a new site on Tucker and Morgan Islands in the West End. In the 1960s, as the Naval Air Station, it moved to Kindley Field, the US Army Air Force base on St David's Island in Castle Harbour, while the West End site became the Bermuda Annex. After closure in 1995 the base became the site of Bermuda International Airport.

== History ==
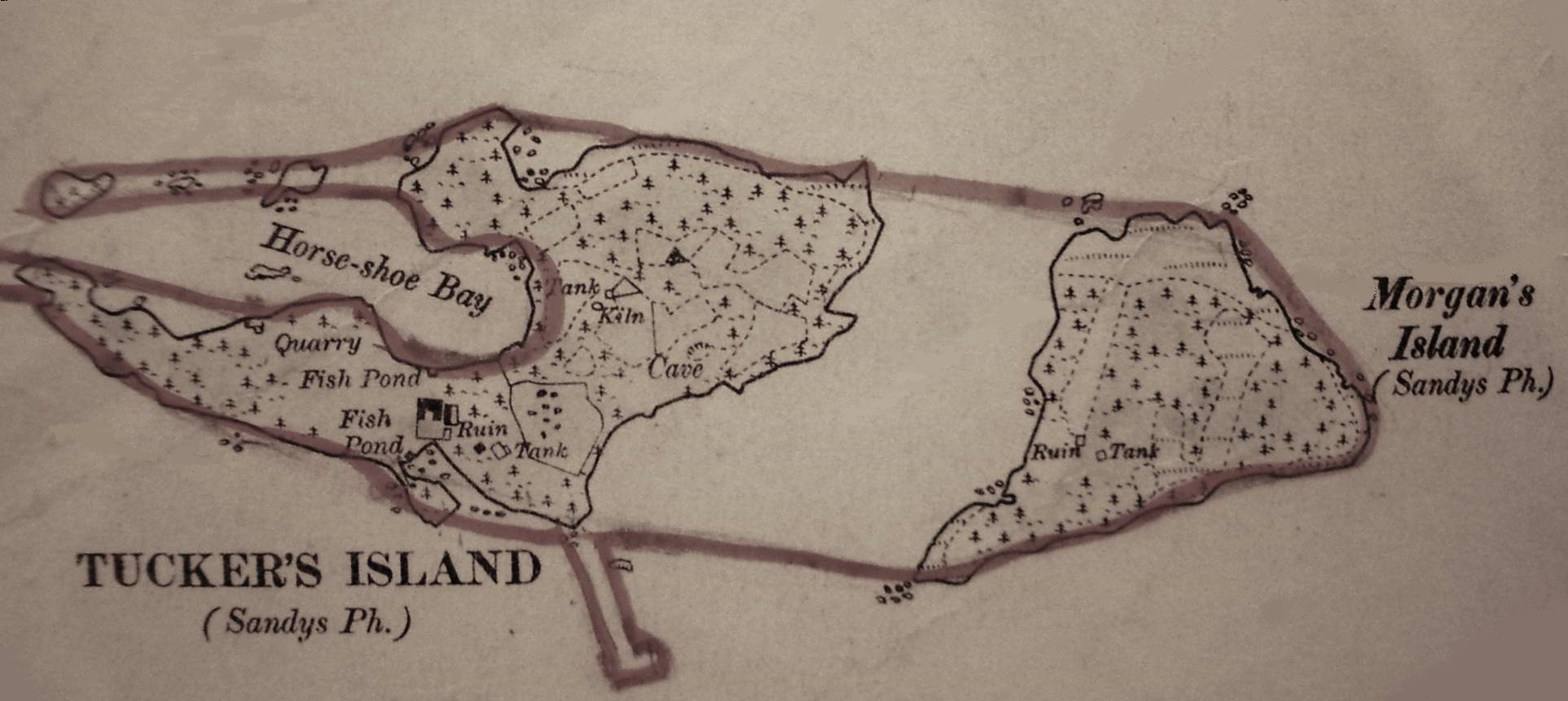
Tucker's & Morgan's Islands, circa 1901

Prior to American entry into the Second World War, an agreement was arranged between the governments of British Prime Minister Winston Churchill and U.S. President Franklin D. Roosevelt for the loan of a number of obsolete, mothballed ex-US Naval destroyers to the Royal Navy and the Royal Canadian Navy, in exchange for which the USA was granted 99-year base rights in a number of British West Indian territories. This Destroyers for Bases Agreement, a forerunner of the Lend-Lease Agreement, had the sleight-of-hand effect of placing the defence of those territories in the hands of the neutral USA, allowing British forces to be sent to the sharper ends of the War. Although not part of this exchange, Churchill also granted the US similar base rights in Bermuda and Newfoundland, however no destroyers or other war material were received by Britain in exchange.

=== Naval Operating Base ===
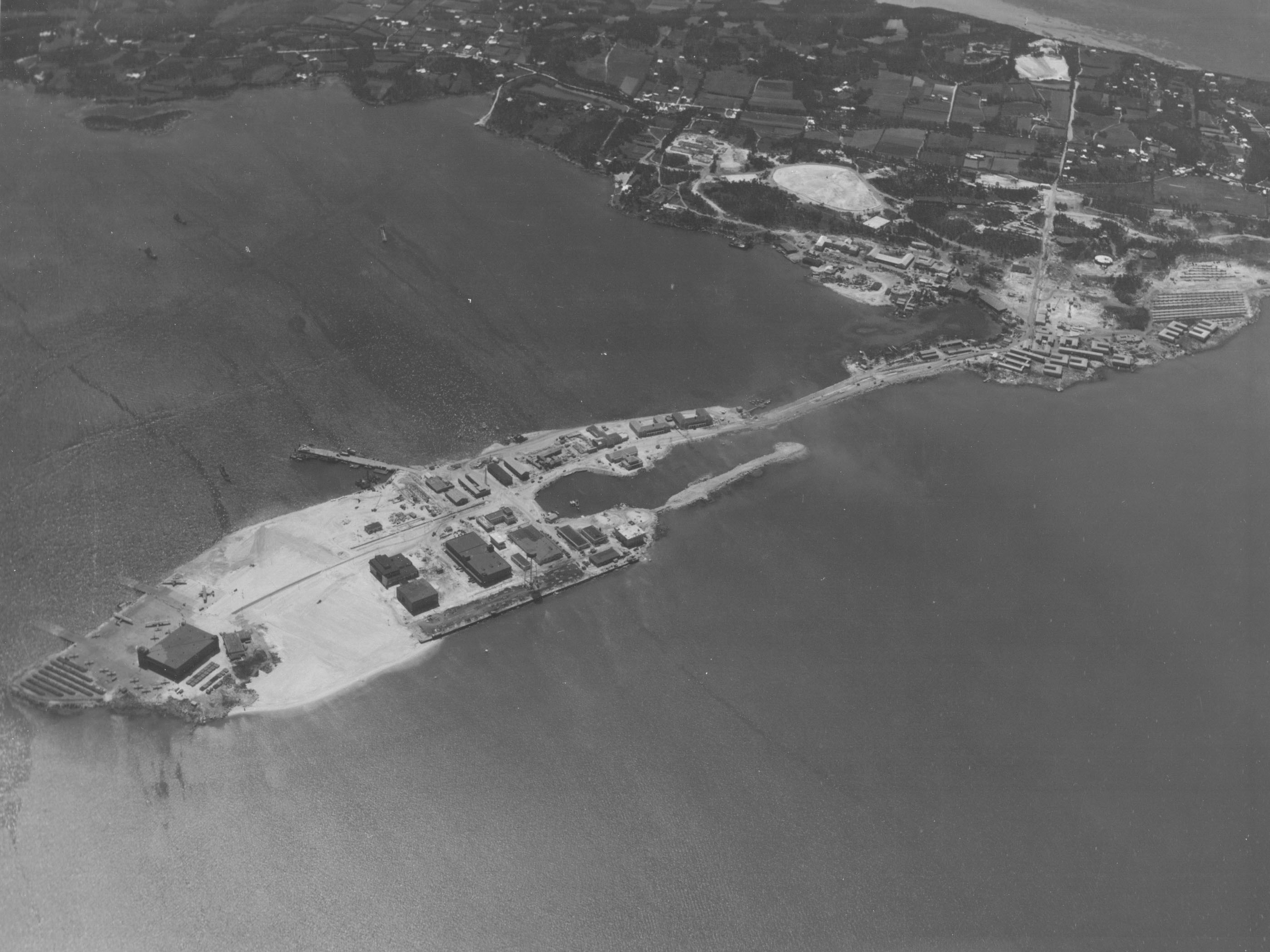
NAS Bermuda looking Southwest from over the Great Sound on September 16, 1942

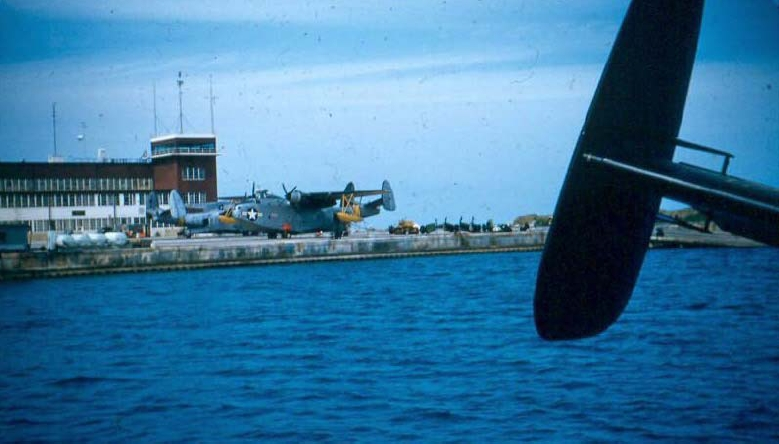
Naval Operating Base Bermuda; Naval Station Bermuda; U S Naval Air Station Bermuda

The grants came as a surprise to the Colonial Government, when US engineers arrived in 1940 to begin surveying the colony for the construction of an airfield that was envisioned as taking over most of the West End of the Island. Frantic protests by the Governor and local politicians led to those plans being revised. The US Army would build an airfield at the North of Castle Harbour. The US Navy would build a flying boat station at the West End. The US Navy began initial operation of Anti-submarine patrols by an Inshore Patrol squadron flying Vought OS2U Kingfisher floatplanes operating from the Royal Air Force station on Darrell's Island, while its own base was being constructed.

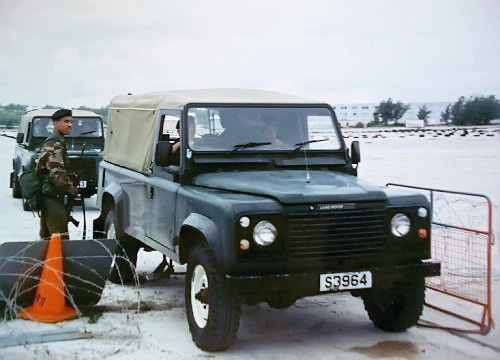
PNCO Cadre of the Bermuda Regiment trains in the Internal Security (IS) role at NAS Bermuda Annex in 1994.

Two islands at the western side of the Great Sound, Tucker's and Morgan's, were levelled, adding 36 acres (150,000 m^{2}) to Bermuda's landmass, and creating a peninsula extending from the Main Island. The entire base measured 260 acres (1.1 km^{2}). It was not long enough to allow a useful runway, but did have extensive tarmac and hangar areas. Large Martin flying boats could be pulled ashore for hangarage, and servicing. When the area was first occupied by the US Navy, it was titled the Naval Operating Base. Once the Naval Air Station was completed, the US Navy relocated its air operations to it from Darrell's Island. The base continued to be used for this purpose until 1965, when the last flying boats were withdrawn from service. US Navy P-2 Neptune landplanes, based at the USAF's Kindley Air Force Base, then took over the maritime patrol role. The former Naval Air Station was redubbed the Naval Air Station Bermuda Annex (NAS Annex). It served primarily as a dock area for US Naval shipping, until the closure of all of the US bases in Bermuda at the end of the Cold War, in 1995.

=== Kindley Field ===
The US Navy moved its anti-submarine air-patrol operations from the old flying boat base, to the USAF Base at Kindley Field when its Martin P5M Marlin flying boats were removed from service in the 1960s. They were replaced by Lockheed P-2 Neptune landplanes, which could not operate from the Annex (the old flying boat base), which had no hard surface runway ashore. The US Navy took over the airfield entirely from the USAF in 1970 and the base continued to operate anti-submarine patrols, first with P-2 Neptunes, then with Lockheed P-3 Orions. In the 1980s, the P-3s were occasionally augmented by carrier-based S-3 Vikings operating ashore, as well as Canadian Forces' Lockheed CP-140 Aurora and Royal Air Force Hawker Siddeley Nimrod MR.2 aircraft.

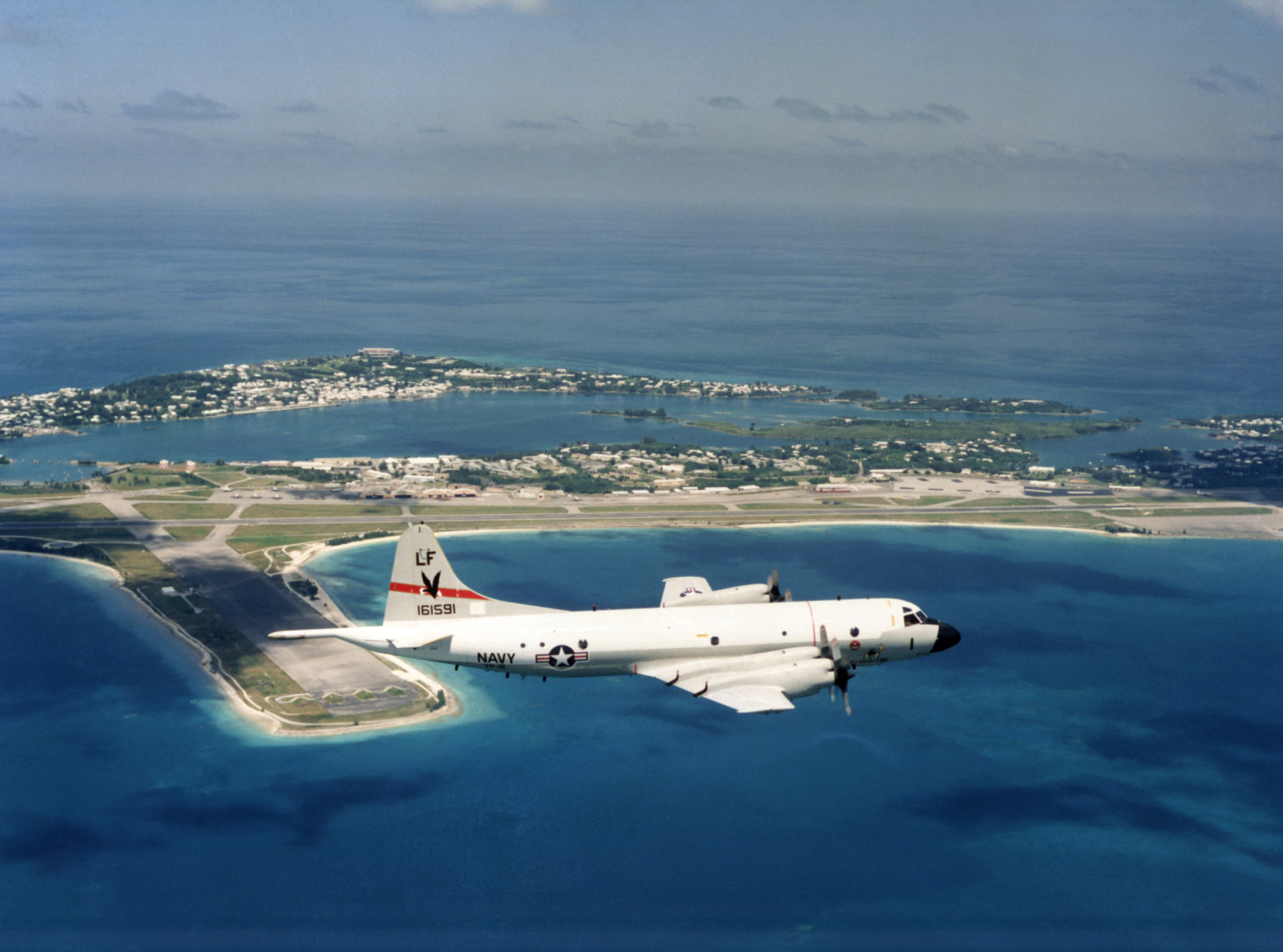
A P-3C from VP-16 returning to NAS Bermuda, 1985.

By the early 1990s, the range of Submarine-Launched Ballistic Missiles (SLBMs) had so increased that Soviet submarines no longer found it necessary to come within range of Bermuda-based patrol aircraft in order to strike their targets in the United States. This was followed by the dissolution of the Soviet Union in 1991, and a general lessening of tensions between the USSR's successor state, the Russian Federation and the US.

Reflecting these developments, the US Naval air detachment at Bermuda had been steadily reduced from a full squadron of Regular Navy P-3Cs on six month rotations to an average of three P-3B or P-3C aircraft, primarily from Atlantic Fleet Navy Reserve P-3 squadrons on 60-day rotations, plus the air station's own UH-1N Twin Huey search and rescue aircraft. In 1992, a scathing investigative report by Sam Donaldson, of ABC News, labelled the base as the 'Club Med of the Navy', because of its questionable use by senior military officers and DoD civilian and other U.S. Government civilian officials as a de facto vacation retreat. Subsequently, all three US Naval bases in Bermuda were slated for closure by BRAC. Except for the NASA tracking station on Coopers Island (at the Eastern End of NAS Bermuda), all US facilities in Bermuda were closed in 1995.

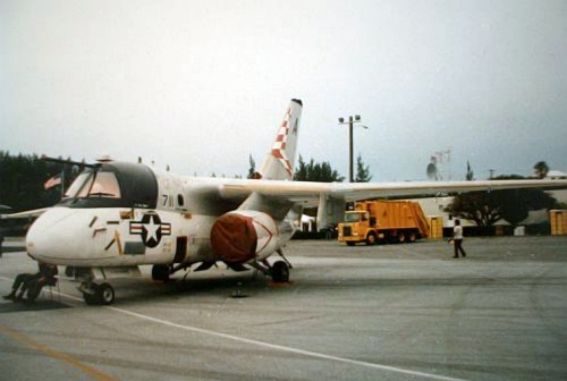
An S-3 Viking of VS-22 at NAS Bermuda, 1985.

The Bermudian government took over operation of the field in 1995, being obliged to spend a great deal of money making it conform to international civil standards. This involved changes to lighting systems, fencing, and razing any objects over a certain height, within a certain distance of the runway (which included both the former base commander's residence, and the hillock it stood on). The US Government still held the lease, which was for initially set at 99 years back in WWII however, until negotiations were completed regarding the cleanup of toxic waste left behind. The cost of clean-up of all US Navy facilities in Bermuda was then estimated at $65.7 million, although that included $9.5 million for replacing the Longbird Bridge. The final compromise negotiated by the UK, Bermuda, and USA governments, which comprised an $11 million payment for the replacement of Longbird Bridge, has been denounced by many in Bermuda as a betrayal, but the field has now been transferred entirely to the Bermuda Government as the Bermuda International Airport. It was an alternative landing site for NASA's Space Shuttle.

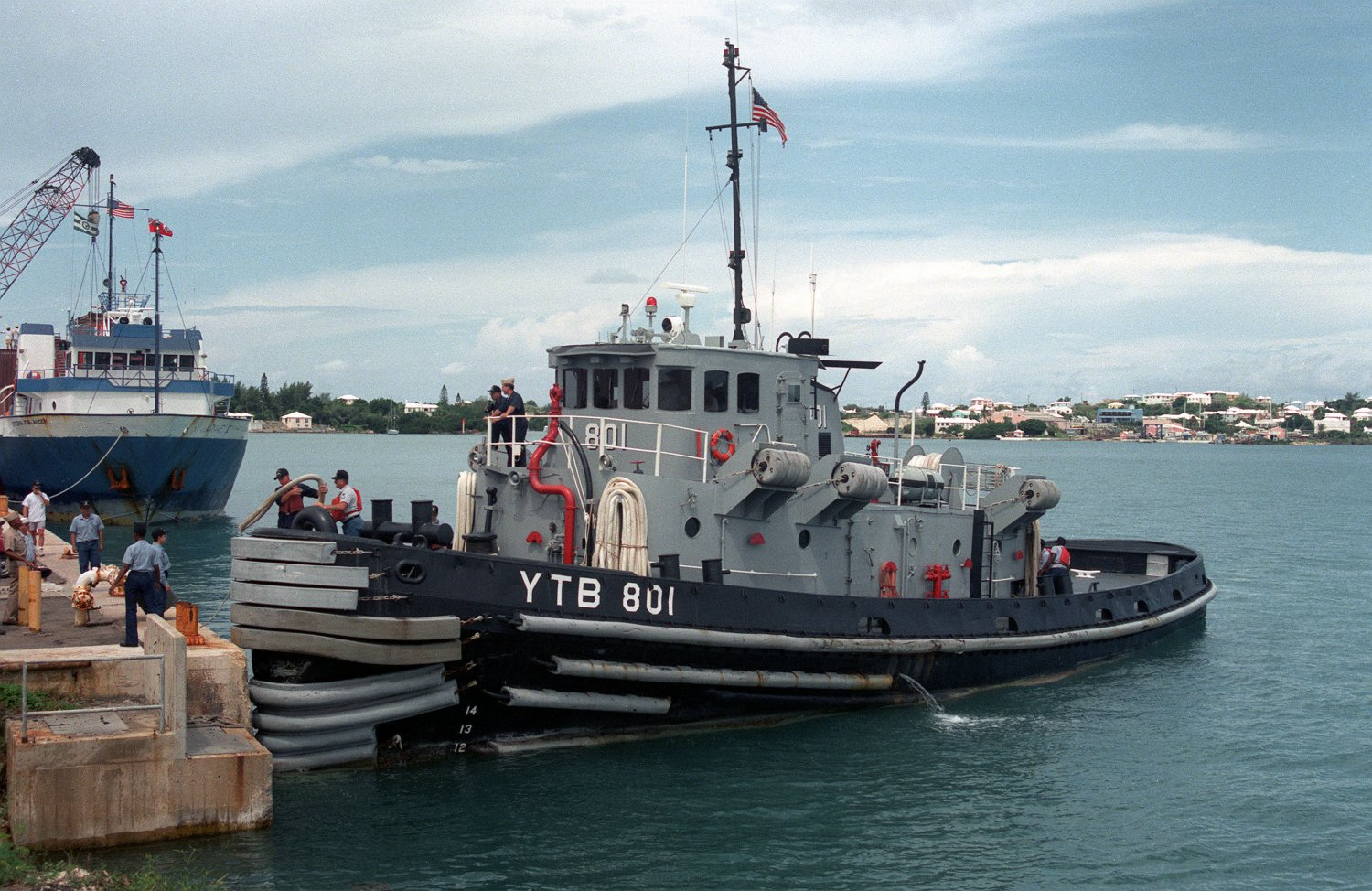
The U.S. Navy tug USS Palatka (YTB-801) leaving Bermuda in August 1994.

Areas for clean-up identified in 1997 by a private contractor were:

- Cleaning up petroleum and heavy-metal contamination
- Eliminating friable and non-friable asbestos
- Demolishing derelict and unsafe buildings
- Replacing Longbird Bridge, which they described as unsafe and prone to malfunction

The estimated cost was $65.7 million:

- $11.7 million would be spent on the environmental cleanup.
- $30.9 million would be spent on removing asbestos.
- $8.6 million would be spent on demolition.
- $5.1 million would be spent on managing the work.
- $9.5 million would be spent on replacing Longbird Bridge.

The lands which hosted the base were formally returned to Bermuda in 2002.

== Additional US Navy Commands formerly in Bermuda ==
- United States Naval Base 24, White's Island (1918–1919)
- United States Supply Station, Agar's Island (1918–1919)
- Naval Air Station Bermuda Annex (Morgans Point, 1941–1995)
- Naval Facility Bermuda (Tudor Hill, 1954–1995)
- Patrol Squadron Bermuda (rotational P-3C squadron from NAS Jacksonville or NAS Brunswick while deployed)
- Aircraft Intermediate Maintenance Department Bermuda
- Marine Corps Barracks Bermuda
- USN Submarine Base, Ordnance Island, Bermuda
- Marine Corps Security Force Bermuda
- Naval Medical Clinic Bermuda (formerly USAF Hospital Kindley AFB; formerly Naval Hospital Bermuda)
- Personnel Support Activity Detachment Bermuda
- The Lieutenant Commander Roger B. Chaffee School, a former Department of Defense Dependent School System (DoDDS) facility (Now Clearwater Middle School)
- Anti-Submarine Warfare Operations Center (ASWOC) Bermuda (Ceased Operations and Buildings Removed April 1993)
- Naval Meteorology and Oceanographic Detachment Bermuda
- Navy Exchange Bermuda

== Former names ==
- Kindley Field, of the USAAF, and Fort Bell, of the US Army (1941–1948)
- Kindley Air Force Base, of the United States Air Force (1948–1970)

== See also ==
- USCG Air Station Bermuda (1963–1965)
- Royal Air Force, Bermuda, 1939-1945
- Military of Bermuda
- US Naval Advance Bases
