= USCG Air Station Bermuda =

Former US Coast Guard base in Bermuda

Coordinates: 32°21′58″N 64°41′32″W

The USCG Air Station Bermuda provided air-sea rescue services from Bermuda between 1952 and 1966. It was operated by the United States Coast Guard detachment on Bermuda.

== History ==
During the Korean War active patrol squadrons returned to Naval Air Station Bermuda to facilitate Anti-submarine warfare in the Atlantic Ocean. As a result of increased activity at the base, in 1952 the US Navy requested the formation of a search and rescue unit in Bermuda.

In the same year the USCG Office of Aviation began planning for the formation of the new unit. The first task was selecting three PBM 5A flying boats from storage and ensuring their airworthiness. In September 1952 Lieutenant Commander James Iversen made a visit to Bermuda to establish administrative and maintenance provisions and to seek out aircraft ramp space. The air detachment was formally commissioned on 31 October 1952.

The PBM flying boats were eventually replaced by Martin P5M Marlin which were in turn replaced by the Grumman HU-16 Albatross in 1961.

The detachment moved from the Naval Air Station Bermuda to Kindley Air Force Base in November 1963 as a result of the US Navy making the same move. It remained there until the withdrawal of its HU-16 Grumman Albatross in 1965. Their role was subsequently filled by helicopters.

With the advent of commercial jet aircraft in the 1960s and the increased reliability of these aircraft, the station was deemed to no longer be required which led to it being decommissioned in 1966.

== Operations ==
Aircraft based at the USCG station were frequently tasked with assisting aircraft which had suffered an engine failure. The coast guard's main role in these scenarios was to intercept the aircraft and assist by dropping survival supplies and directing surface vessels should a Water landing became necessary.

After the Korean War, air traffic to Bermuda increased significantly and the air station's responsibilities expanded from being used mainly in incidents involving the US Navy to being responsible for SAR in accordance with ICAO frameworks. A coast guard Rescue coordination centre was subsequently established with responsibility for both military and civilian rescue activity in Bermuda.

=== Notable Missions ===
Besides standard rescue missions, there are a number of notable missions involving USCG Air Station Bermuda:

- During Project Mercury a coast guard aircraft would orbit a set location until it was confirmed that the capsule was safe.
- During the Cuban Missile Crisis aircraft were dispatched to keep a watch over Bermuda and the Bahamas.
