= Rescuing Leftover Cuisine =

U.S. food rescue nonprofit organization

Rescuing Leftover Cuisine (RLC) is a nonprofit organization that redistributes surplus food from businesses to community organizations serving people experiencing food insecurity. Founded in New York City in 2013 by Robert Lee, the organization operates through a network of staff and volunteers and has expanded to multiple cities across the United States, including Atlanta, Chicago, Los Angeles, and Columbus.

== History ==
While studying at New York University, Robert Lee joined Two Birds One Stone, a student organization that collects surplus food from campus dining halls and delivers it to nearby homeless shelters. Lee later served as president of the organization for seven of his eight semesters at NYU, and he has stated that his experience with the group influenced the development of Rescuing Leftover Cuisine. Lee has also credited his upbringing in a food insecure household to his interest in food waste prevention.

Lee and fellow club member Louisa Chen subsequently developed the concept for RLC and entered it in a startup pitching competition. The proposal won the competition, and Lee and Chen used the $1,000 prize to establish RLC in July 2013.

After graduating from New York University in 2013, Lee began working as an analyst at J.P. Morgan while continuing to develop Rescuing Leftover Cuisine. During this period, he built a network of New York City businesses that donated surplus food and recruited volunteers to transport donations to homeless shelters and other community organizations.

Following its founding, RLC expanded its network of food donors, volunteers, and nonprofit partners beyond New York City. By 2024, the organization reported rescuing more than 4.5 million pounds of food annually. Its partnerships included institutions such as Citi Field and the New York Stock Exchange.

== Operations ==
RLC coordinates a network between businesses donating surplus food, volunteers, and nonprofit organizations that serve people experiencing food insecurity. Food donors include restaurants, grocery stores, corporate cafeterias, and event venues. Donated food is distributed to nonprofit organizations including homeless shelters, food pantries, and other social service organizations.

As part of the organization's model, RLC provides food donors with their reports to identify opportunities to reduce the amount of surplus food that is produced.
