= HMCS Somers Isles =

HMCS Somers Isles was a temporary training facility and stone frigate for the Royal Canadian Navy (RCN) in Bermuda from 1944 to 1945 during the Second World War. Following the war, the base was closed. Beginning in mid-1944, work-up training for naval ships stationed on the East Coast of Canada took place in Bermudian waters as it allowed for training year-round compared to the RCN's previous work-up site, St. Margaret's Bay and Pictou, Nova Scotia.

== Background ==
During the Second World War, the RCN required an area to perform work up training for its ships in an area where operational requirements would not interfere. Traditionally, this was done near the RCN's main east coast naval base at Halifax, Nova Scotia. However, to improve overall training and specifically asdic training, the RCN transferred its training facilities to Bermuda, a colony of the United Kingdom. The RCN had previous experience with Bermuda, as prior to this, the RCN worked with the Royal Navy in establishing an anti-submarine training program at Casemates Barracks starting in 1939.

The base was located at Convict Bay, St. George's Parish. It was originally built for the use of the Royal Navy, and was named for the prison hulks moored there by the Admiralty to house convict labourers. After the Royal Navy relocated the Royal Naval Dockyard and Admiralty House to Ireland Island and Spanish Point, respectively, Convict Bay was transferred to the War Office in the 1860s and absorbed into the adjacent St. George's Garrison. The Bermuda Militia Artillery moved out of Convict Bay in 1944 to make way for the RCN. During Royal Navy service the base also assisted with converting 50 ex-United States Navy destroyers to RN and RCN service in 1940 under the Lend-Lease program.

== Service history ==
In January 1943, the RCN sought a new place to train their warships. The existing location, in St. Margaret's Bay and Pictou, Nova Scotia where the heavy weather in winter affected training. Bermuda was suggested as a location. Planning for a base in Bermuda only began in January 1944 and an agreement was reached with the United Kingdom where a base would be lent to Canada. The base was commissioned on 1 August 1944 and given and named for the alternative name for Bermuda, the Somers Islands. The new base allowed Canadian ships to train in anti-submarine warfare before entering or re-entering service, something that Canadian warships had little chance to do during the war once activated. By May 1945, 119 Canadian ships had passed through the facility. Towards the end of the war, the base was used to prepare frigates for service in the Pacific theatre. The RCN abandoned HMCS Somers Isles at the end of the war, one of eleven facilities that was disbanded by March 1946. Prior to closure, the RCN had intended to keep four motor launches at Somers Isles for target practice, but this idea was abandoned when the base was shuttered and the Motor Launches were deemed obsolete.

== Sources ==
- Boutiller, James A., ed. (1982). RCN in Retrospect, 1910–1968. Vancouver: University of British Columbia Press. ISBN 0-7748-0196-4.
- German, Tony (1990). The Sea is at Our Gates: The History of the Canadian Navy. Toronto: McClelland & Stewart Incorporated. ISBN 0-7710-3269-2.
- Hadley, Michael L. (1985). U-Boats Against Canada: German Submarines in Canadian Waters. Montreal, Quebec and Kingston, Ontario: McGill-Queen's University Press. ISBN 0-7735-0811-2.
- Tucker, Gilbert Norman (1952). The Naval Service of Canada, Its Official History – Volume 2: Activities on Shore During the Second World War. Ottawa: King's Printer. OCLC 4346983.
- Williams, Ronald John, ed. (1960). "Canadian Navy's Golden Jubilee". The Bermudian. Vol. 31, no. 1–12. Hamilton, Bermuda. OCLC 220578378.
