= St. George's Garrison, Bermuda =

British military post

St. George's Garrison
- Bermuda
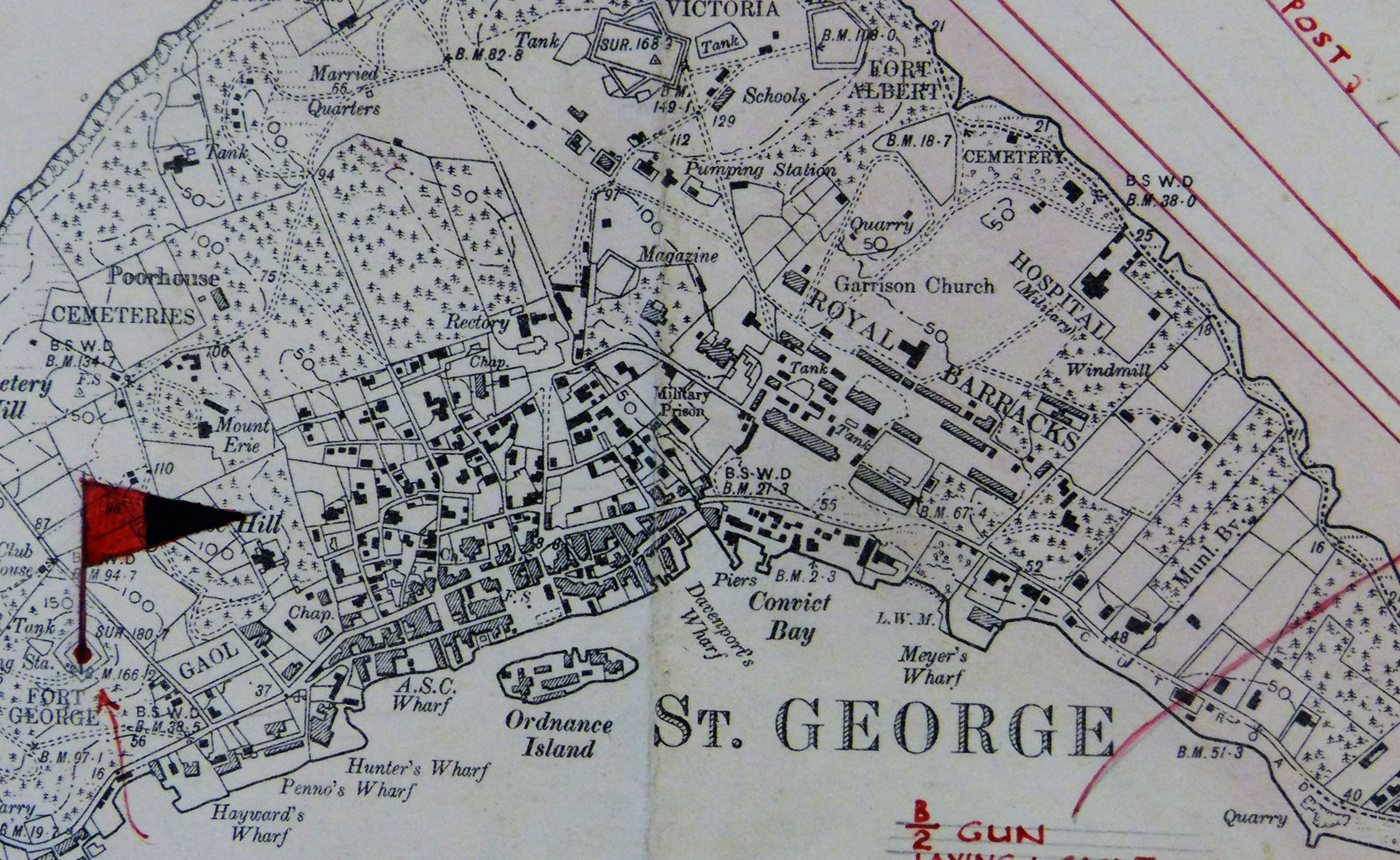
- St. George's Garrison (and St. George's Town) as surveyed by Lieutenant Arthur Johnson Savage, RE, in 1897-1899

Site information
- Type: Barracks
- Owner: War Office
- Operator: British Army

Location
- Location in Bermuda
- Coordinates: 32.383763°N 64.672985°W

Site history
- Built: 1793
- Built for: Board of Ordnance and War Office
- In use: 1793 - 1957

Garrison information
- Garrison: Bermuda Garrison
- Occupants: British Army, Royal Navy, Royal Canadian Navy, United States Army Coast Artillery Corps

St. George's Garrison was the first permanent military camp of the Bermuda Garrison established in the British colony and Imperial fortress of Bermuda (or The Somers Isles), with construction of Old Military Road and the original Royal Barracks commencing during the war between Britain and France that followed the French Revolution. It would remain in use until 1957, when it was transferred to the civil (colonial) government with most of the other Admiralty and War Office properties in Bermuda.

== History ==
The Bermuda Garrison had been established in May, 1701, with the arrival in Bermuda of an Independent Company of regular soldiers (Captain Lancelot Sandys, Lieutenant Robert Henly, two sergeants, two corporals, fifty private soldiers, and a drummer) detached from the 2nd Foot of the English Army (along with the new Governor and Commander-in-Chief, Captain Benjamin Bennett) aboard HMS Lincoln. Prior to this, the only military forces in Bermuda had been the part-time militia and voluntary gunners who manned the fortified coastal artillery batteries. The Independent Companies was permanently-stationed in the colony, with its personnel effectively settling there and receiving periodic replacements for discharged or deceased personnel. Barracks were not provided as its personnel were accommodated in private homes in St. George's Town, the colonial capital.

Following the conclusion of the Seven Years' War in 1763, the Independent Company was removed. A company of the 9th Foot was detached from Florida, reinforced with a detachment from the Bahamas Independent Company, but this force was also withdrawn in 1768, leaving only the militia. During the American War of Independence, regular soldiers invalided from continental battlefields as part of the Royal Garrison Battalion had been stationed in Bermuda (again accommodated primarily within St. George's Town, although some personnel lived under canvas, and others in scattered small accommodations in or near forts, such as at Ferry Reach, Fort Paget on Paget Island, and at King's Castle on Castle Island) between 1778 and 1784, but all companies of the Royal Garrison Battalion were gathered in Bermuda and disbanded following the Treaty of Paris which recognised the independence of the thirteen colonies that were to form the United States of America.

US independence, however, resulted in Bermuda's elevation to an Imperial fortress due to its strategic location 640 miles off North Carolina. The Royal Navy immediately began planning for what was to become the Royal Naval Dockyard, although it was first obliged to spend a dozen years charting Bermuda's barrier reef to locate a channel sufficient to give large ships-of-the-line access to the northern lagoon, the Great Sound, and Hamilton Harbour (where the town of Hamilton was established in Pembroke Parish in 1790. The French Revolution accelerated the plans for the Bermuda base, with a detachment of the 47th Regiment of Foot and an Invalid Company of the Royal Artillery sent to Bermuda in 1793, and Vice Admiral Sir George Murray, Commander-in-Chief of the new River St. Lawrence and Coast of America and North America and West Indies Station, setting up the first Admiralty House, Bermuda, at Rose Hill, St. George's, in 1794, with the naval base temporarily established in and around St. George's Town while Ireland Island and other land at Bermuda's West End were being acquired for construction of the dockyard. The first anchorage for the fleet was what is still known as Murray's Anchorage, in the Northern Lagoon off St. George's Island.

The regular artillery company and the infantry were stationed on the hill to the east of St. George's Town (known since as Barrack Hill), where the Royal Barracks were constructed, with detachments posted to forts and other locations around Bermuda, but mostly at the East End where the only channel suitable for large shipping was located, and hence where defences were strongest. The Militia and volunteer gunners, who could be embodied in wartime for full-time service, remained vital to the defence of the colony, but as the regular units of the Board of Ordnance (which included the Royal Artillery and Royal Engineers, as well as commissariat stores, ordnance, transport, and barracks departments) and British Army increased, the colonial Government ceased to fund and maintain the Militia. Although the Militia and volunteers were brought up to strength during the 1812 to 1815 American War of 1812, they were allowed to fade away thereafter, and the regular military forces (after the Crimean War, the Board of Ordnance was abolished in 1855 and its military corps, stores, and transport departments were absorbed into the British Army, making it the regular military force) would assume complete responsibility for land and coastal defence.

Bermuda's importance was due to its location, midway between Nova Scotia and the British West Indies, and 640 miles off the Atlantic seaboard of the new United States. This meant it was perfectly placed to dominate the coast of the United States, as was demonstrated during the American War of 1812 when the squadron of the Royal Navy's North America Station maintained a blockade of the Atlantic coast of the United States.

The naval and military forces based in Bermuda also carried out amphibious operations against targets on or near to the Atlantic coast of the United States during the war. In 1813, Lieutenant-Colonel, Sir Thomas Sydney Beckwith arrived in Bermuda to command a military force tasked with working with the Royal Navy in raiding the Atlantic Seaboard of the United States, particularly in the region of Chesapeake Bay, with the aim of drawing American forces away from the border of the Canadas. The force, which was split into two brigades, was composed of the infantry regiment then on garrison duty in Bermuda, the 102nd Regiment of Foot, Royal Marines, from the ships of the naval squadron, and a unit recruited from French prisoners-of-war. It took part in the Battle of Craney Island on the 22 June 1813.

In August 1814, a force of 2,500 soldiers under Major-General Robert Ross had just arrived in Bermuda aboard HMS Royal Oak, three frigates, three sloops and ten other vessels. Released from the Peninsular War by victory, they were intended to be used for diversionary raids along the coasts of Maryland and Virginia. In response to a request by Lieutenant-General Sir George Prevost (the Captain-General and Governor-in-Chief in and over the Provinces of Upper-Canada, Lower-Canada, Nova Scotia, and New-Brunswick, and their several Dependencies, Vice-Admiral of the same, Lieutenant-General and Commander of all His Majesty’s Forces in the said Provinces of Lower-Canada and Upper-Canada, Nova Scotia and New-Brunswick, and their several Dependencies, and in the islands of Newfoundland, Prince Edward, Cape Breton and the Bermudas, &c. &c. &c) calling for strikes on the United States coast in retribution for the "wanton destruction of private property along the north shores of Lake Erie" by American forces under Col. John Campbell in May 1814 (the most notable being the Raid on Port Dover). Ross and the Admirals in Bermuda consequently decided to employ the force, together with the naval and military units already on the station, to strike at the United States capital in the Chesapeake Campaign, resulting in the Raid on Alexandria, the Battle of Bladensburg, the Burning of Washington, and an attempted assault on Baltimore, Maryland, in the Battle of Baltimore. Bermuda also served as the main base from which the Royal Navy controlled the western Atlantic Ocean from the Arctic to the West Indies (in the twentieth century, the Bermuda-controlled North America and West Indies Station (as the North America Station became in the aftermath of the American War of 1812) of the Royal Navy would become the America and West Indies Station, its area growing to include the western South Atlantic and the Atlantic coast of South America, as well the Pacific Coast, from Tierra del Fuego to the Arctic).

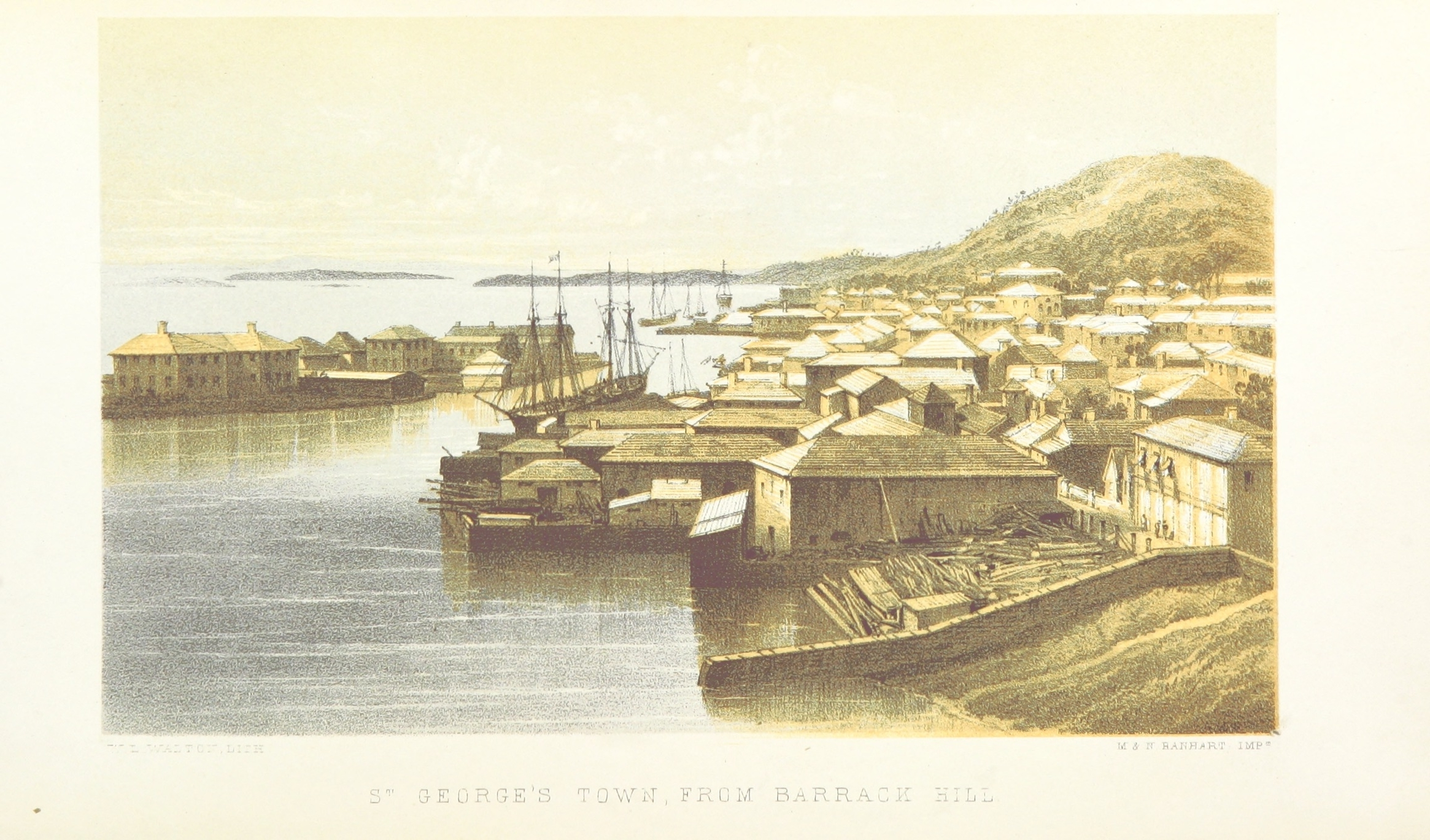
Ordnance Island (left) and St. George's Town as seen from Barrack Hill in 1857

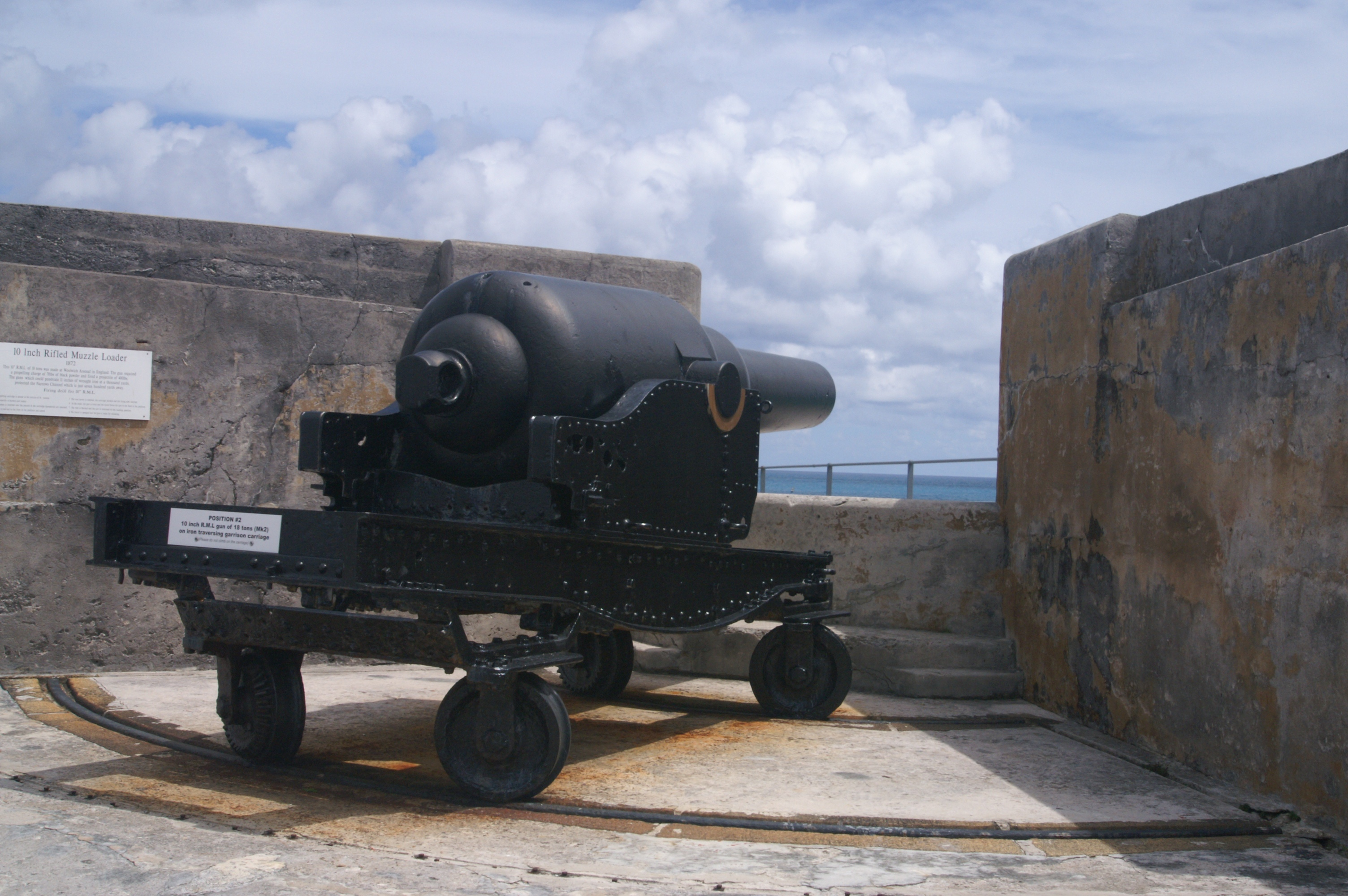
RML 10 inch Mk II gun closeup Fort St Catherine

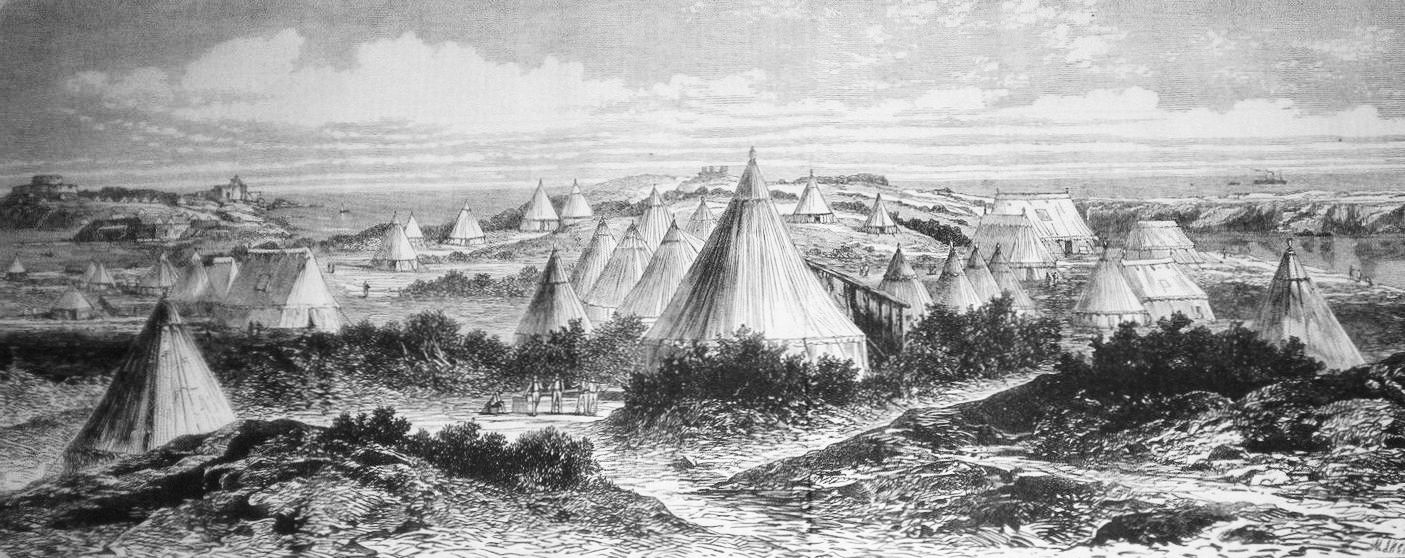
Royal Artillery and Royal Engineers camp at Tucker's Town, St. George's Parish, Bermuda, in 1867. Summer tent camps were a tactic to combat Yellow fever epidemics that stuck the soldiers in barracks especially heavily.

Hamilton town became the colonial capital in 1815 with the movement of Government House and the Parliament of Bermuda there (the former to Mount Langton on the northern side of the town, but outside of the municipal boundary), roughly concurrent with the move of the naval base to the West End, and of the Admiralty House (which had already been moved to Mount Wyndham at Bailey's Bay, in Hamilton Parish to Spanish Point, near Hamilton town. The military remained headquartered at St. George's as St. George's Garrison was the only large camp in Bermuda.

In the 1840s, however, land was acquired in Devonshire Parish, to the east of the Town of Hamilton, for the construction of Prospect Camp, and, by the 1860s, the Bermuda Garrison headquarters and most of the infantry had relocated there. As the coastal artillery defences remained heaviest at the East End, the Royal Artillery remained mostly stationed at St. George's Garrison. In the 1860s, the Royal Navy transferred its landholdings in the eastern and central parishes to the military, and its land at Convict Bay and Naval Tanks in St. George's were both absorbed into the adjacent St. George's Garrison, with Convict Bay becoming a Royal Engineers Yard.

After the last convict labourers used to build the Royal Naval dockyard were removed from Bermuda in 1863, Boaz and Watford Islands at the West End, the site of Clarence Barracks (which had been built to house convicts), was transferred from the Admiralty to the War Office and became a third main army camp in Bermuda. The colony was divided into three military districts, with the western controlled from Clarence Barracks, the central from Prospect Camp, and the eastern from St. George's Garrison, and overall headquarters for Bermuda at Prospect.

St. George's Garrison, which usually connoted the various barracks, forts, and other facilities occupying contiguous land to the east and north of the town (including the Royal Barracks, New Barracks built in the 1860s, the Station Hospital, Royal Engineers Yard and hutment barracks, various married quarters, single officers' quarters, messes, Fort St. Catherine's, Fort Victoria, Fort Albert, the Western Redoubt, and sundry other facilities) consequently included several nearby satellite facilities, such as Town Cut Battery (Gates' Fort), Fort George, Alexandra Battery, the Army Ordnance Corps depot of Ordnance Island and the Commissariat facility (later an Army Service Corps Wharf) on Water Street in St. George's Town, and control of all of the more distant fortified coastal batteries and other military facilities and detachments scattered about St. George's Parish and eastern Hamilton Parish.

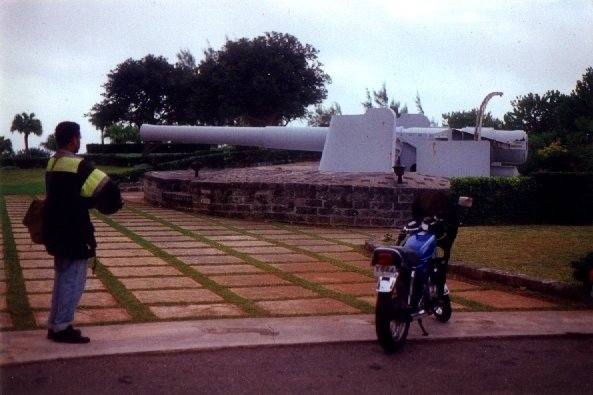
BL 9.2 inch gun Mk X at Fort Victoria on St. George's Island in Bermuda

The number of batteries decreased at the end of the nineteenth century as the range and power of coastal artillery guns rapidly increased, with a consequent reduction in the number of soldiers. Drastic cutbacks of the British Army following the First World War included the withdrawal of the regular Royal Artillery and Royal Engineers companies from Bermuda in 1928 (the regular infantry establishment was also steadily reduced between the two world wars). The Bermuda Militia Artillery had been created in 1895 as a part-time, local-service reserve within the Royal Artillery. Although intended to be embodied only in wartime, or for annual training, to re-inforce the regular gunners, it took on the entire responsibility for manning the batteries in readiness for war, and the Bermuda Volunteer Engineers was raised in 1930 to take on some of the responsibilities of the withdrawn regular engineers (specifically, manning the Defence Electric Lights used to illuminate targets for the coastal artillery). Although the small sizes of these units meant that only two 6-inch guns at St. David's Battery could be kept ready for war, much of the weekly training took place at St. George's Garrison, where the Bermuda Militia Artillery headquarters was located at Convict Bay.

During the Second World War, the Royal Canadian Navy was given use of Convict Bay, which it commissioned as HMCS Somers Isles. The US Army was given use of Fort Victoria and Fort St. Catherine's. The Canadian and United States forces were withdrawn at the end of the war.

== Closure ==
In 1951, the British Government, in another round of post-war defence cutbacks, reduced the Royal Naval dockyard to a base, with the ships based there being required to cross the Atlantic to Portsmouth to undergo repairs or refits. At the same time it was decided to remove the regular units and detachments of the Bermuda Garrison in 1953, leaving the part-time units and the United States forces (which had received 99 year free base leases in Bermuda from the British Government during the war, and to which control of the North-Western Atlantic region was delegated within the North Atlantic Treaty Organization). The regular British Army units had been so reduced prior to this that all were based at Prospect Camp. Boaz and Watford Islands had been returned to the Admiralty before the Second World War, and with he disembodiment of the part-time local units of the British Army after the war, St. George's Garrison was largely vacant. The decision to close the Bermuda Garrison was quickly reversed by Prime Minister Sir Winston Churchill after he hosted United States President Eisenhower and French Premier Laniel at a conference in the Mid-Ocean Club at Tucker's Town in 1953. However, another round of cutbacks to the British Army was to result in the closure of the garrison in 1957, and the withdrawal of all regular army personnel other than those of Government House and the Permanent Staff of the part-time units. At the same time, most of the remaining Admiralty, and all of the remaining War Office, land in Bermuda was transferred to the local government in exchange for £750,000.

Since the closure of the garrison, the local government has used parts of the New Barracks for police accommodation, and then for the St. George's Secondary School, and the former Sergeants' Mess is now occupied by a nursery school. the original Royal Barracks no longer exist, with new housing units constructed in their place. The Station Hospital has been used for flats, but is currently becoming derelict. Sergeant's quarter's to the north of this have been removed and were replaced in the 1960s with the building currently housing the Bermuda Branch of the Royal Artillery Association. Most of the other buildings remain, mostly as private housing. A new accommodation block was built opposite the Garrison church to house Bermuda Police Service constables. Fort St. Catherine's has housed a museum since the 1960s. Town Cut Battery has been restored as a visitor site. Alexandra Battery is under restoration. A hotel was built on Retreat Hill, between Fort Victoria and Fort Albert, in the 1960s, occupied successively by Holiday Inn, Loew's, and Club Med. After sitting vacant and increasingly derelict for twenty years, this was demolished in 2008. The St. George's Golf Course, which occupies areas of the Garrison that had never been built upon as well as the former locations of hutment barracks and married quarters, which has also been out of operation for years, is being redeveloped in conjunction with the destruction of natural space (and of part of the golf course) on St. Catherine's Point for the construction of a resort.
