= Bermuda Sea Cadet Corps =

Bermuda Sea Cadet Corps (BSCC)
- The badge of the Bermuda Sea Cadet Corps
- Founded: 1966
- Country: Bermuda (UK)
- Branch: Royal Navy
- Type: Volunteer Youth Organisation
- Size: 3 Training Ships (shore stations)
- Headquarters Unit: TS Bermuda
- Motto: Ready Aye Ready
- Website: TS Bermuda; TS Admiral Somers; TS Venture

Commanders
- Lieutenant Commander, Royal Naval Reserve (Sea Cadet Corps): Lieutenant Commander Michael Frith, RNR (SCC)
- Notable commanders: Commander A.J. Boyd, RN; Lieutenant Commander J. Derek Taylor, RNR (SCC); Lieutenant Commander William Anthony Lightbourne, RNR (SCC); Lieutenant Commander Dwayne Trott, RNR (SCC).

The Bermuda Sea Cadet Corps was created in 1966 and registered as a charity under the Bermuda Sea Cadet Association Act, 1968. The first unit had actually been created two years earlier.

== History ==
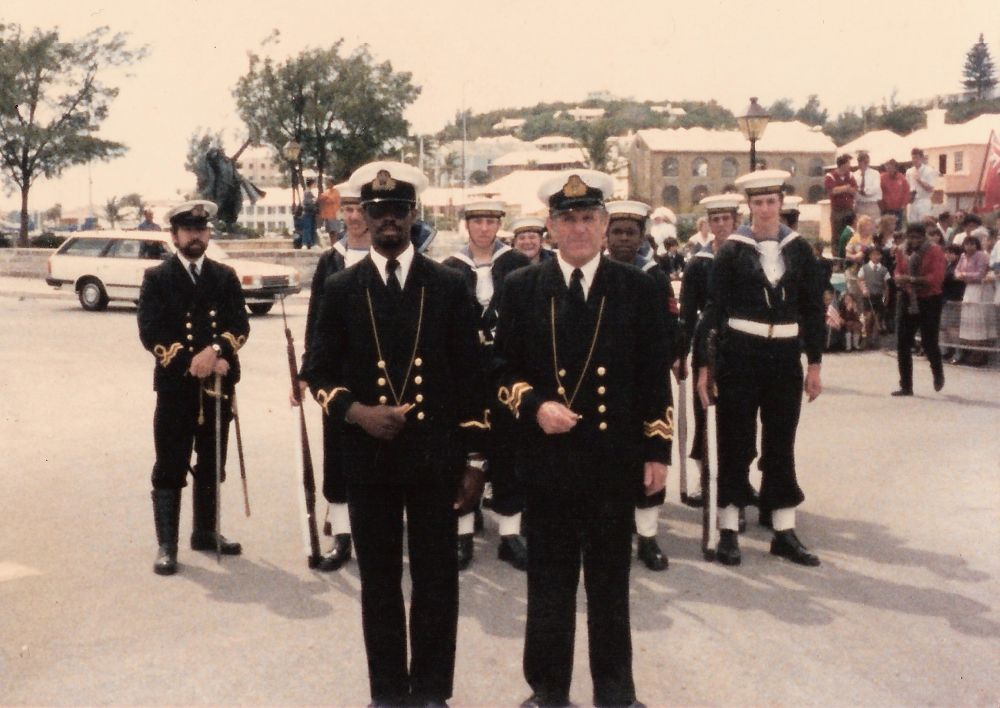
Lt. Commander John Edwards, RNR (SCC), Lt. Mario Oliviera, RNR (SCC), Sub-Lt. Colvin Manning, RNR (SCC), and the Guard of TS Admiral Somers parade at Ordnance Island, Bermuda for the completion of Dodge Morgan's record-breaking circumnavigation of the world aboard the American Promise on 11 April 1986.

Despite Bermuda's historical maritime economy, its connection with naval history (its location astride the route taken back to Europe by Spanish galleons had led Robert Rich, 2nd Earl of Warwick, a chief investor in the Virginia Company, that settled Bermuda - alias the "Somers Isles", and its spin-off, the Somers Isles Company, to utilise the colony as a base for privateering in the early 17th Century), and its long period as a naval base and dockyard, there were no Sea Cadet units on the island before that date. This was even though Army Cadets had been established in the 19th century, and the Air Training Corps had been established locally during the Second World War. The Royal Naval Association Bermuda Branch (with members including serving and former members of the Royal Navy, Royal Naval Reserve, and Royal Naval Volunteer Reserve) decided to rectify the omission, and began organising a local unit in 1964. The Corps, effectively a branch of the UK Sea Cadet Corps, but administered separately by a local Executive Council, soon comprised three shore units, known as Training Ships. These are all located on former naval properties. TS Bermuda (the first unit, formed on 12 January 1966) is located on the grounds of the former Admiralty House, in Spanish Point, Pembroke (near the capital of Bermuda, the City of Hamilton). TS Admiral Somers is named for the founder of Bermuda, and Admiral of the Virginia Company, Sir George Somers. It is located at Convict Bay, St. George's, which takes its name from the prison hulks the Admiralty moored there at the turn of the 18th/19th centuries, when the area was used as a naval base before the re-location to the West End. The area was also used by the Royal Canadian Navy during the Second World War, commissioned as HMCS Somers Isles. The last unit, TS Venture, is located on Ireland Island, the core of the Royal Navy lands in Bermuda, and the location of the Royal Naval Dockyard. The first Admiralty inspection of the cadets of TS Bermuda was carried out on 7 April 1967, by Commander A. J. Boyd, the Commanding Officer of HMS Malabar.

== Organisation and Training ==
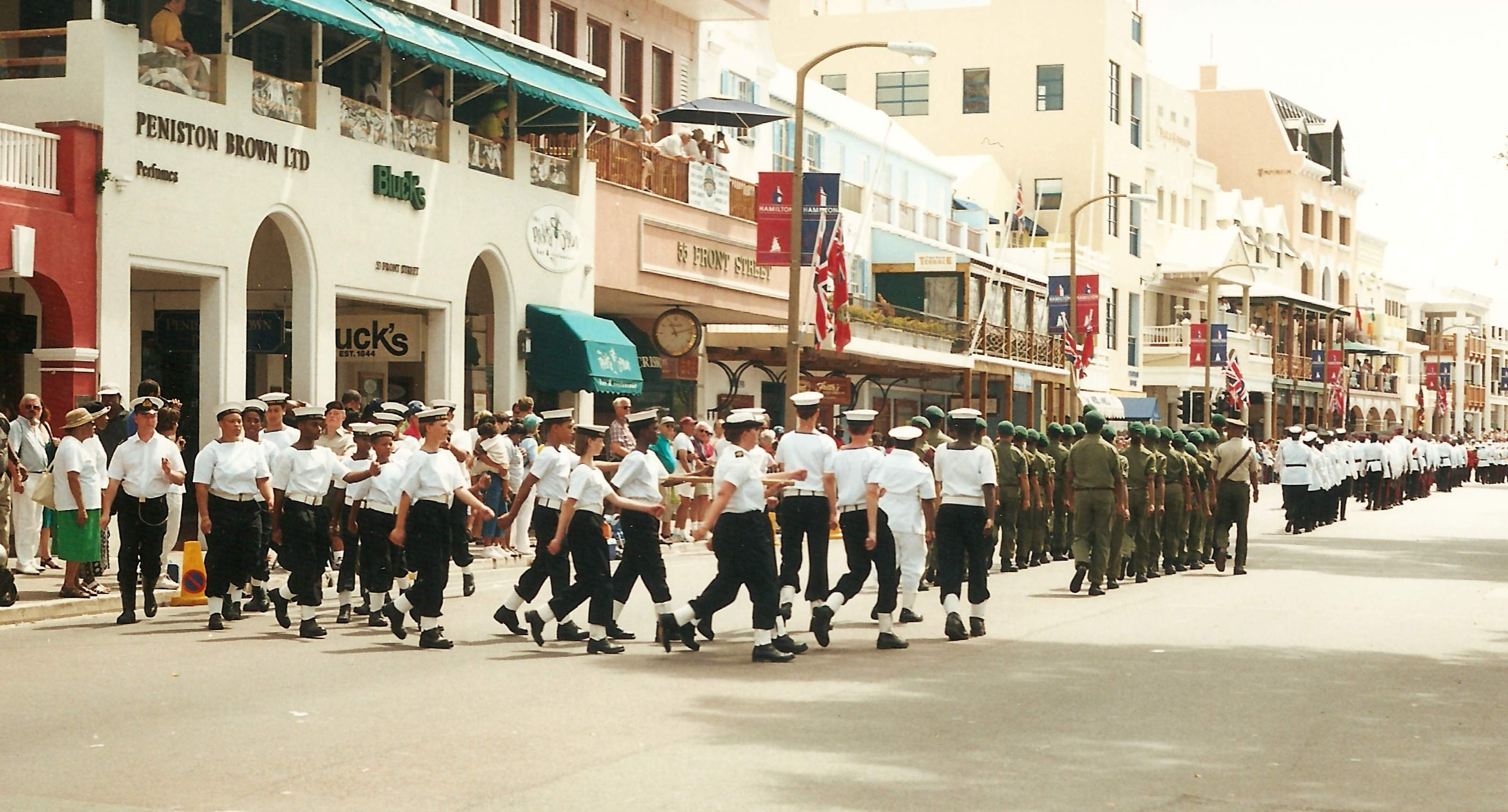
Queen's Birthday Parade, Hamilton Bermuda 2000

The Executive Council of the Corps is responsible for the overall sponsorship, financing, support and administration of the Corps. While the Council members are not uniformed personnel, many members over the years have been retired naval officers, including former Presidents of the BSCA Captain Sir David Tibbits, RN, DSC, who had married Bermudian Mary Butterfield while serving on the Bermuda-based HMS Scarborough in the 1930s, was later Navigating Officer of the also Bermuda-based HMS York at the start of the Second World War in 1939, and from 1949 to 1951 commanded HMS Snipe, which was based in Bermuda from 1946 to 1952, and Captain Gilbert Hallam, RN, who joined the Royal Navy at the Royal Naval Dockyard, Bermuda, in 1946, and had been a Commander, serving as Supply Officer of HMS Seahawk, when he had met with then-Lieutenant J. Derek Taylor, RNR (SCC), leading a contingent of cadets training at RNAS Culdrose in 1974.

TS Bermuda, the first unit opened, is nominally the Headquarters unit. Each unit has its own Management Committee, responsible for raising funds for the unit's expenses. All officers in the Bermuda Sea Cadet Corps are members of the Royal Naval Reserve, and their names are followed by "RNR (SCC)". The rank bars worn on the cuffs of their jackets, and on epaulettes of shirts and pullovers follow the pattern of the old Royal Naval Volunteer Reserve, being 'wavy', instead of straight. Each unit is under the command of a Commander, or a Lieutenant-Commander, RNR (SCC), with junior officers, Warrant Officers, and Cadet Instructors, Cadet Petty Officers, and cadet ratings making-up the rest of the command structure.

Before the Royal Naval Base on Ireland Island, HMS Malabar, closed in 1995, the Corps maintained a close relationship with it, with the commanding officer of the base having inspected the units annually. Cadets often are attached to Royal Navy vessels for sea experience, and also train on the UK Sea Cadet Corps tall ship, TS Royalist. The Corps has also taken a leading interest in the building of Bermuda's own tall ship for youth training, the Spirit of Bermuda. Commander Anthony Lightbourne, RNR (SCC) was a Director of the Bermuda Sloop Foundation, which built and operates the traditionally designed vessel.

Female cadets and instructors had technically belonged nominally to the Girls Nautical Training Corps (GNTC), although practically they served within the Bermuda Sea Cadet Corps units. This distinction ceased in 1992, when the GNTC was merged into the Sea Cadet Corps in the UK and Bermuda.

In addition to training, the corps provides detachments for various public parades during the course of the year, including the King's Birthday and Remembrance Day.

== Uniform ==
The Corps wears the cold water Royal Navy ceremonial uniform, of Navy blue trousers and jerseys (differentiated by Sea Cadet Corp shoulder titles worn above rating badges at the top of the sleeves). A white square-front shirt and white crowned caps (originally part of the tropical uniform, but now worn by the Royal Navy with the cold water uniform) is also used. Whereas the Royal Navy staff of HMS Malabar had worn tropical uniform (white shorts, square-front shirt, and cap) during the summer months, the Bermuda Sea Cadet Corps wears the cold water uniform in shirt-sleeve order. The working uniform was the No. 8 Action Work Dress, composed of blue shirt and darker blue trousers, Navy blue pullover sweater and Navy blue beret with "Sea Cadet Corps" badge (although this badge with the addition of the word "Bermuda" is used on some signs, it is not an item of uniform). Rating badges in red are worn on dark blue rank slides on the shoulders of this uniform, which are also marked "SCC". This uniform is being replaced in 2025 with the Royal Navy Personal Clothing System (RNPCS) No. 4 Dress, with a dark blue shirt and trousers, and Navy blue beret, with or without the same pullover sweater that was worn with No. 8 Action Work Dress. The shirt is worn with a "Royal Navy" patch on the right breast, "Cadet Forces" on the left breast, a White Ensign patch on the upper left arm, with a "Sea Cadet Corps" shoulder patch above it. The guards of the units wear whitened 1937 pattern belts with brass furniture and anklets.

== Cadet rating badges ==
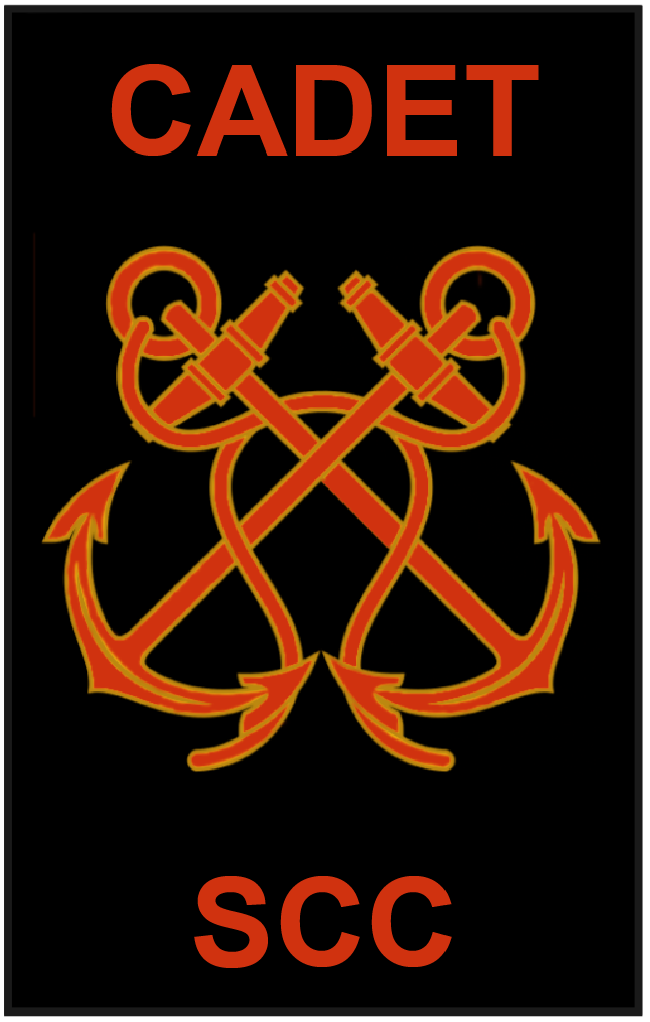
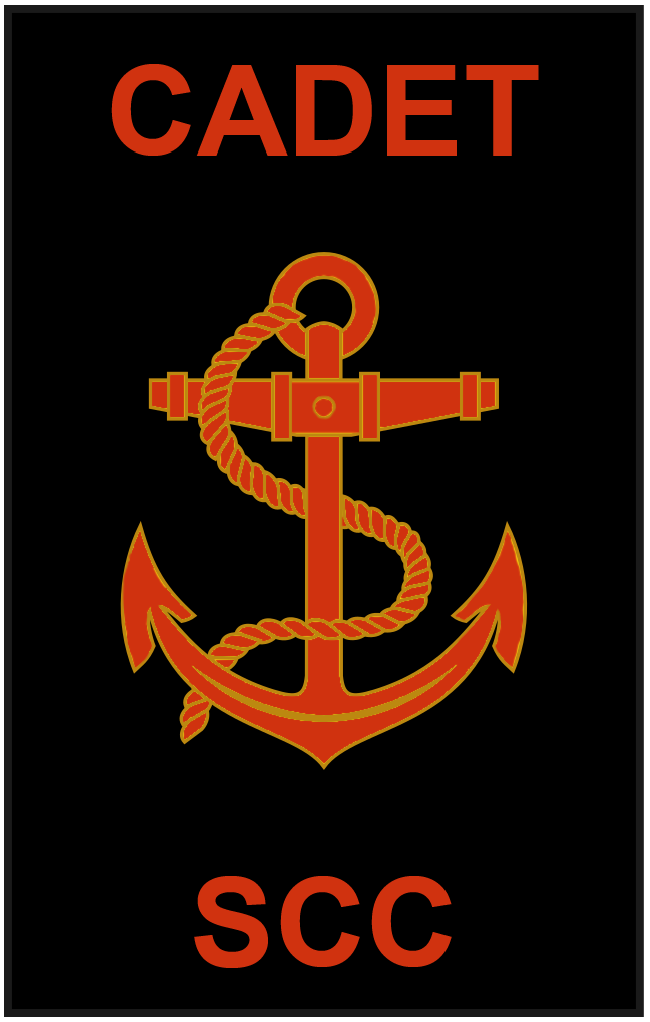
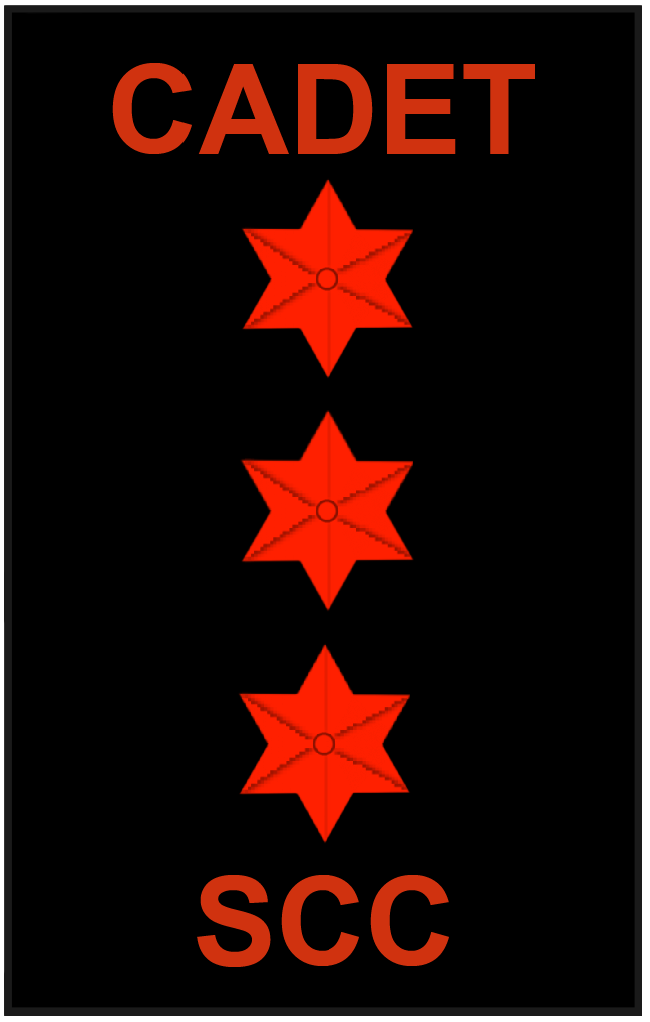
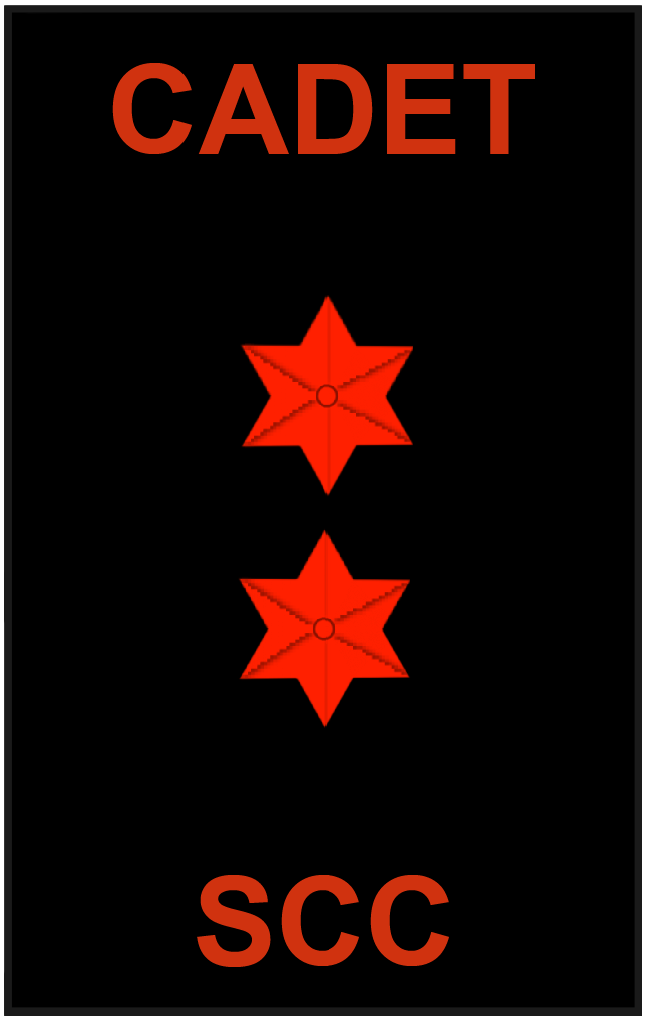
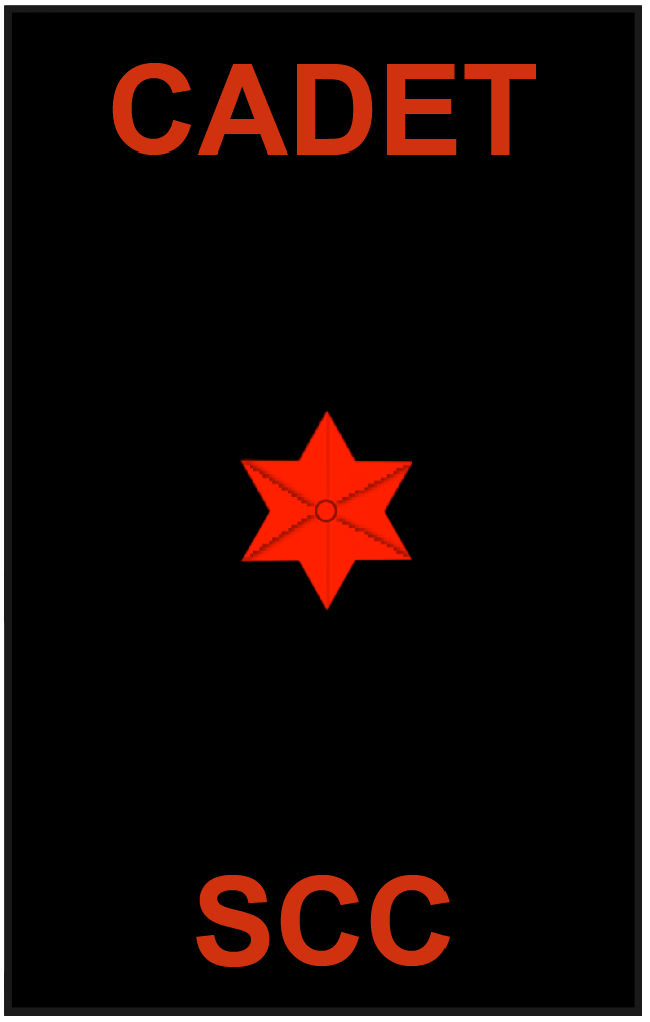
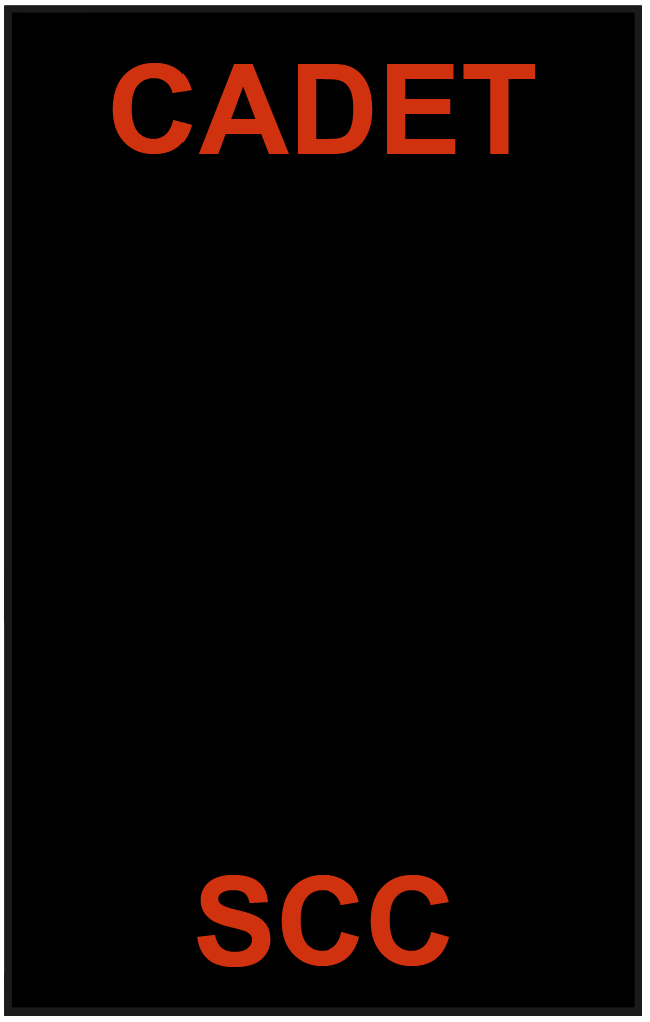
Cadet service	Cadet under officers	Cadet senior NCOs		Cadet junior NCOs			Cadets	Recruits
Bermuda Sea Cadet Corps								No insignia
Bermuda Sea Cadet Corps		Petty Officer; Cadet	Leading; Cadet	Able Cadet	Ordinary Cadet	Cadet 1st Class	Cadet	New Entry

== Adult officers rank badges ==
Sea Cadet Corps officers	Captain RNR (SCC)	Commander RNR (SCC)	Lieutenant Commander RNR (SCC)	Lieutenant RNR (SCC)	Sub-Lieutenant RNR (SCC)	Midshipman RNR (SCC)
Insignia						

Sea Cadet Unit Officers (NCOs)	Warrant Officer 1 RNR (SCC)	Warrant Officer 2 RNR (SCC)	Chief Petty Officer	Petty Officer	Probationary Petty Officer	Civilian Instructor
Rank Slide						

== Weapons ==
Each unit holds Lee-Enfield No. 4, Mk. I and No. 4, Mk. II rifles, deactivated for drill purpose only (any training in marksmanship is done with the Royal Bermuda Regiment using borrowed rifles). Edged weapons used for ceremonial duties include the No. 9, Mk I Bayonet (used with the No. 4 rifle), and Royal Naval pattern swords and dirks for use by officers.

== Gallery ==
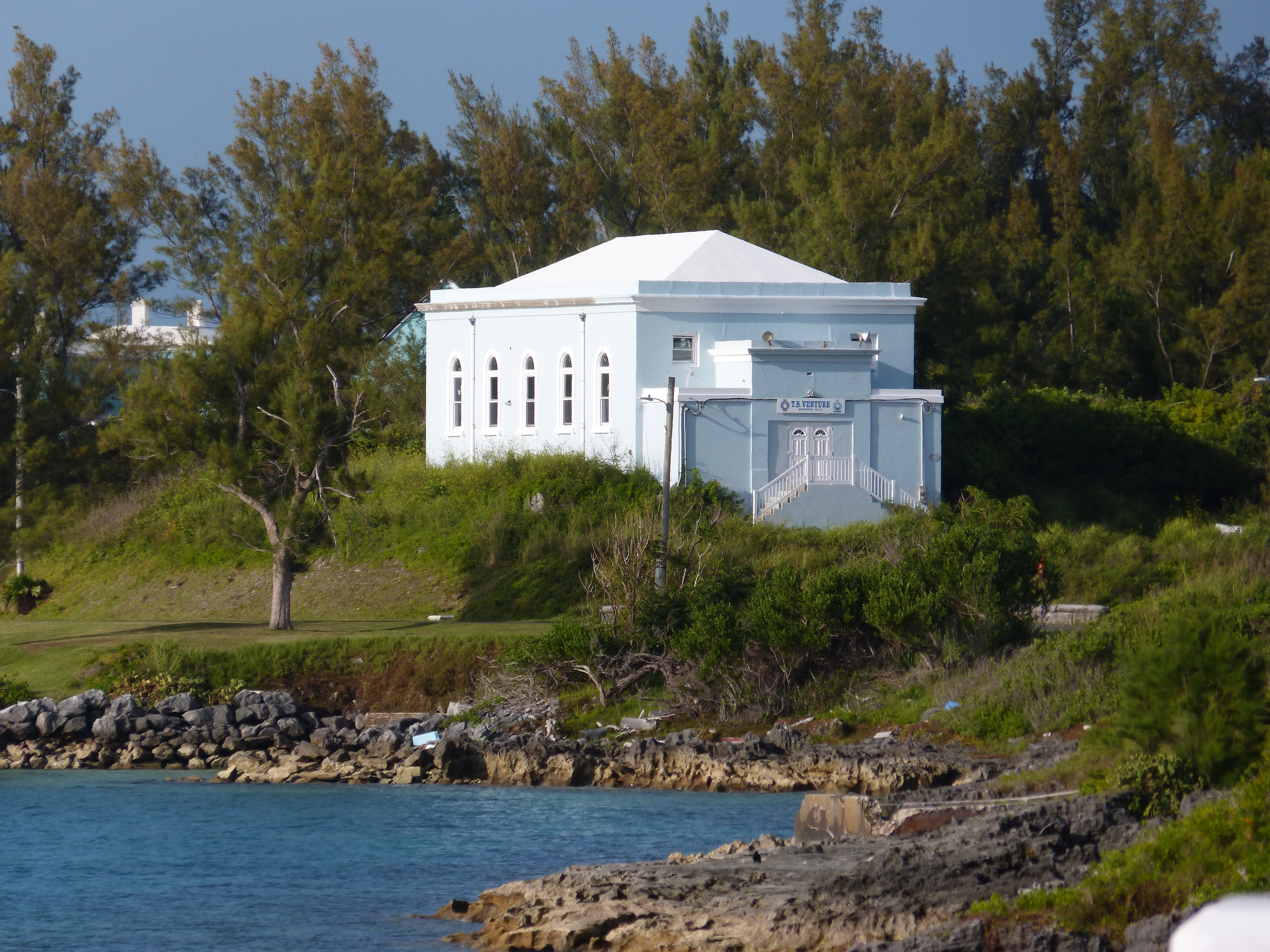
TS Venture, on Ireland Island

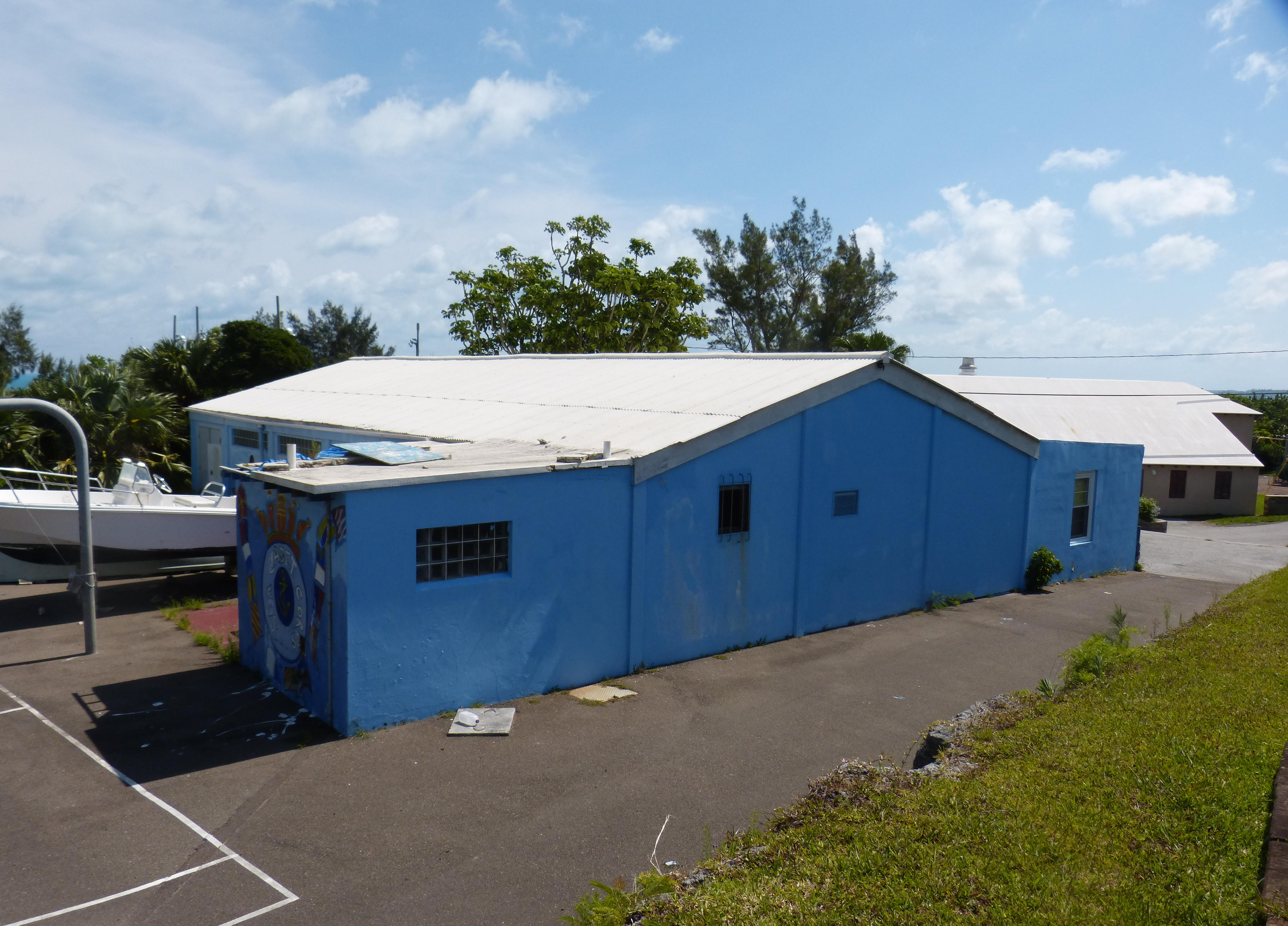
TS Bermuda at Admiralty House

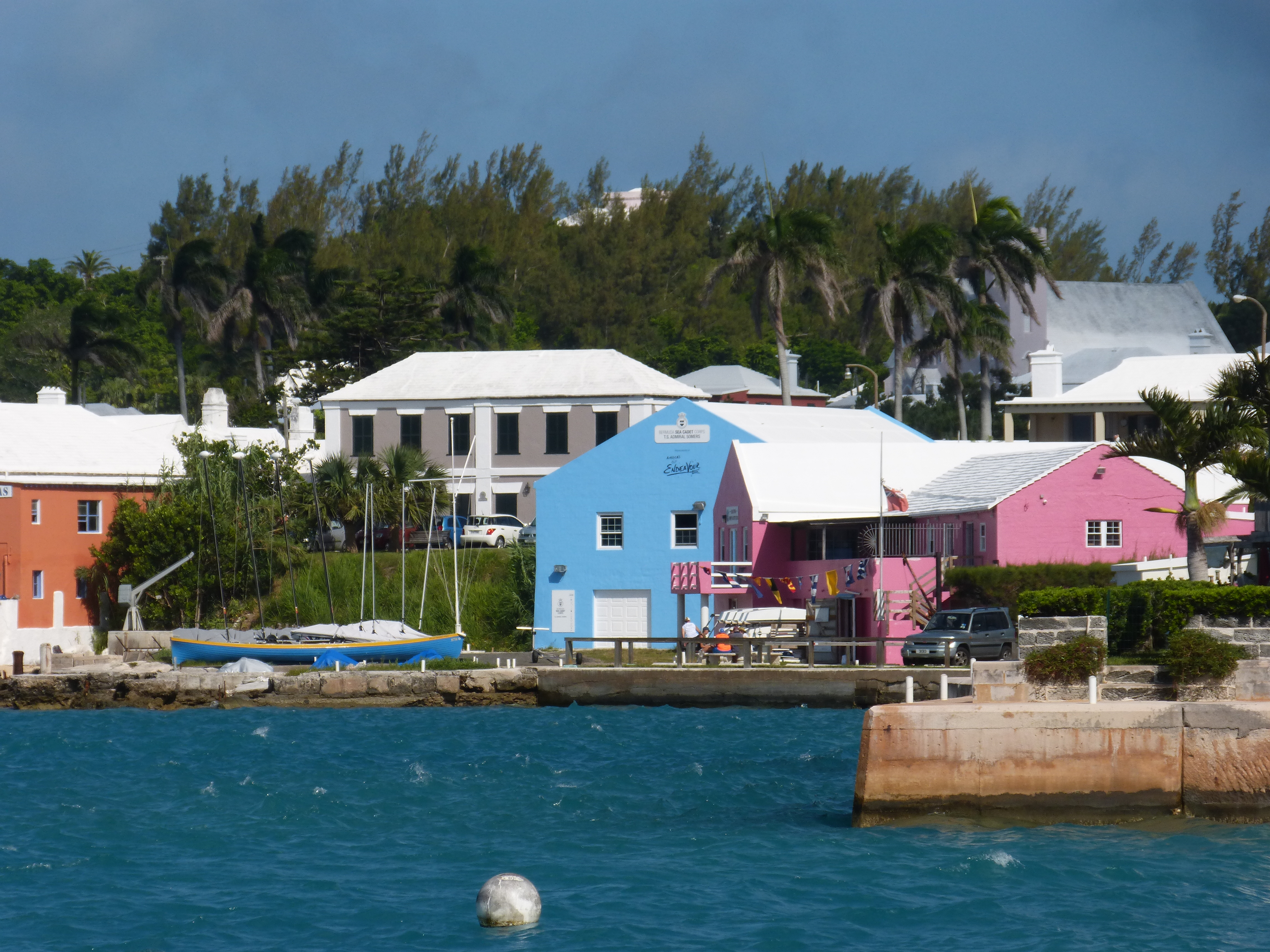
TS Admiral Somers at Convict Bay
