= Victor Pelson =

American executive and businessman

Victor A. Pelson
- Born: 1937; Newark, New Jersey, United States
- Died: October 29, 2012 (aged 74–75)
- Occupation: Business executive
- Known for: Board director of AT&T Corporation

Victor A. Pelson (1937-2012) was an American executive and businessman who held varies senior positions in AT&T Corporation including served as a member of the Board of Directors.

== Early life and education ==
Pelson graduated from the New Jersey Institute of Technology in 1959 with a Bachelor of Science degree in Mechanical Engineering. In 1988, NJIT awarded him the Edward F. Weston Medal. He received an Honorary Doctor of Science from the university in 2001, and served on the Board of Trustees for fourteen years.

== Career ==
Pelson began his career at Western Electric and held various positions at AT&T Corporation. In 1993, he was named the Chief Operating Officer and Chairman of the Global Operations Team at AT&T. He also served as a member of the Board of Directors. In 1996, he retired from AT&T Corporation.

He also served as a member of the board of United Parcel Service from 1990-2008, Director of Eaton Corporation from 1999 until 2010, and Director of Acterna Corporation.

In 2001, he was named Chairman of the Board at Carrier1. He served as a Senior Advisor of both UBS Securities, LLC and Dillon, Read & Co. He served as Director of Dun & Bradstreet Corporation until 2010.

== Other positions and death ==
He also served as the Chairman of the New Jersey State Chamber of Congress from 1989 to 1991.

Pelson died on October 29, 2012.
