= American Promise =

American Promise may refer to:

- American Promise (organization), an organization advocating for an Amendment to the U.S. Constitution to allow the U.S. Congress and states to limit campaign spending in U.S. elections
- American Promise (yacht), a yacht used by Dodge Morgan to circumnavigate the Earth
- American Promise (film), a 2013 documentary film
- The American Promise, a speech by U.S. President Lyndon B. Johnson to Congress on March 15, 1965
