= Industrial Computer Source =

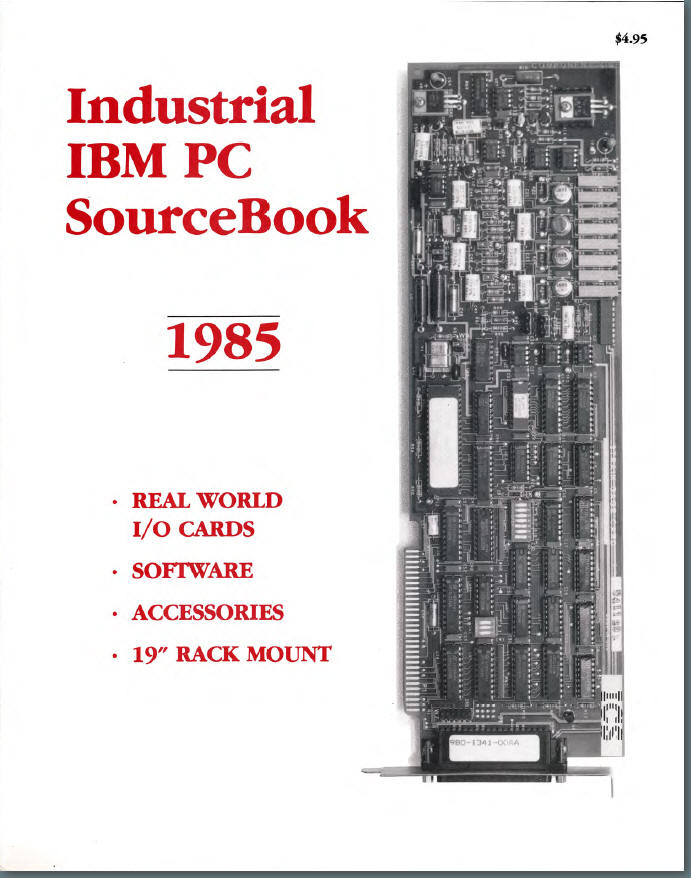
Front cover for Industrial Computer Source first catalog

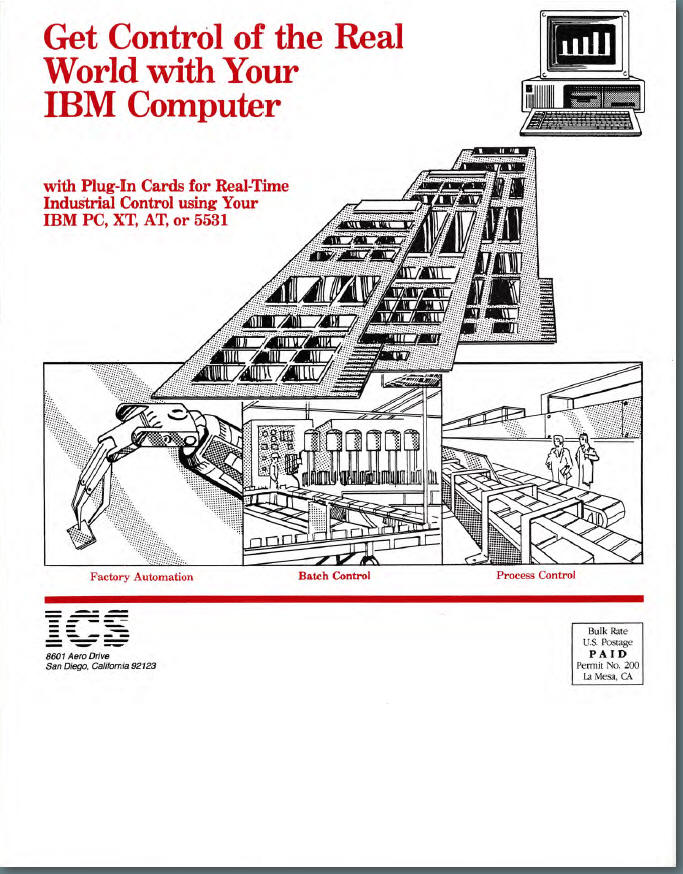
Back cover for Industrial Computer Source first catalog

Industrial Computer Source was a company launched in 1985 with the publication of their first Industrial Computer Sourcebook. Industrial Computer Source was also known as ICS. Industrial Computer Source became notable for the volume of Sourcebooks mailed to engineers and scientists. The company would mail two to four Sourcebooks per year with quarterly supplements.

The company was headquartered in San Diego, CA. Eventually there were satellite divisions in the UK, France and Germany.

The first Sourcebook was 52 pages long. Included were sections on industrial computers, industrial I/O cards, monitors and printers, rack accessories, computer accessories, software and books. The 6531, a 4U rackmount computer with a 4.77 MHz 8088 processor. 128KB of RAM, 360K floppy and 10MB hard drive sold for $7,795.00.

The products were industrial and rackmount computers, I/O cards and accessories.

Industrial Computer Source was sold to Dynatech in 1992.

In 1999, the company acquired Advent Design, Inc. and changed the name to ICS Advent.

In 2001, Kontron purchased ICS Advent from Dynatech. While Kontron is a German firm, the US division of Kontron initially occupied the headquarters building of ICS Advent in San Diego before moving to a new building in Poway, CA., in May 2005.

Kontron allowed the trademark "Industrial Computer Source" to lapse July 20, 2002, and the trademark "Industrial Computer Sourcebook" lapsed May 31, 2003. Chassis Plans secured the trademark "The Original Industrial Computer Source" December 27, 2005. Chassis Plans offers original equipment support for previous Industrial Computer Source customers.

Industrial Computer Source is currently a popular term used by companies in the industrial computer market with a Google search returning over 24,000 pages. Many previous customers still search on that term looking for the company for either new equipment or support for existing systems.

Industrial Computer Source and ICS Advent systems can often be found for sale on eBay.

Industrial Computer Source started as a division of Action Instruments as created by Chuck Philyaw. The concept of Intrapreneur was popular and Industrial Computer Source fit the definition perfectly. David Lippincott was brought in as a founder for technical and manufacturing support. Misters Philyaw and Lippincott purchased Industrial Computer Source from Action Instruments in 1987.
