= Royal Naval Association =

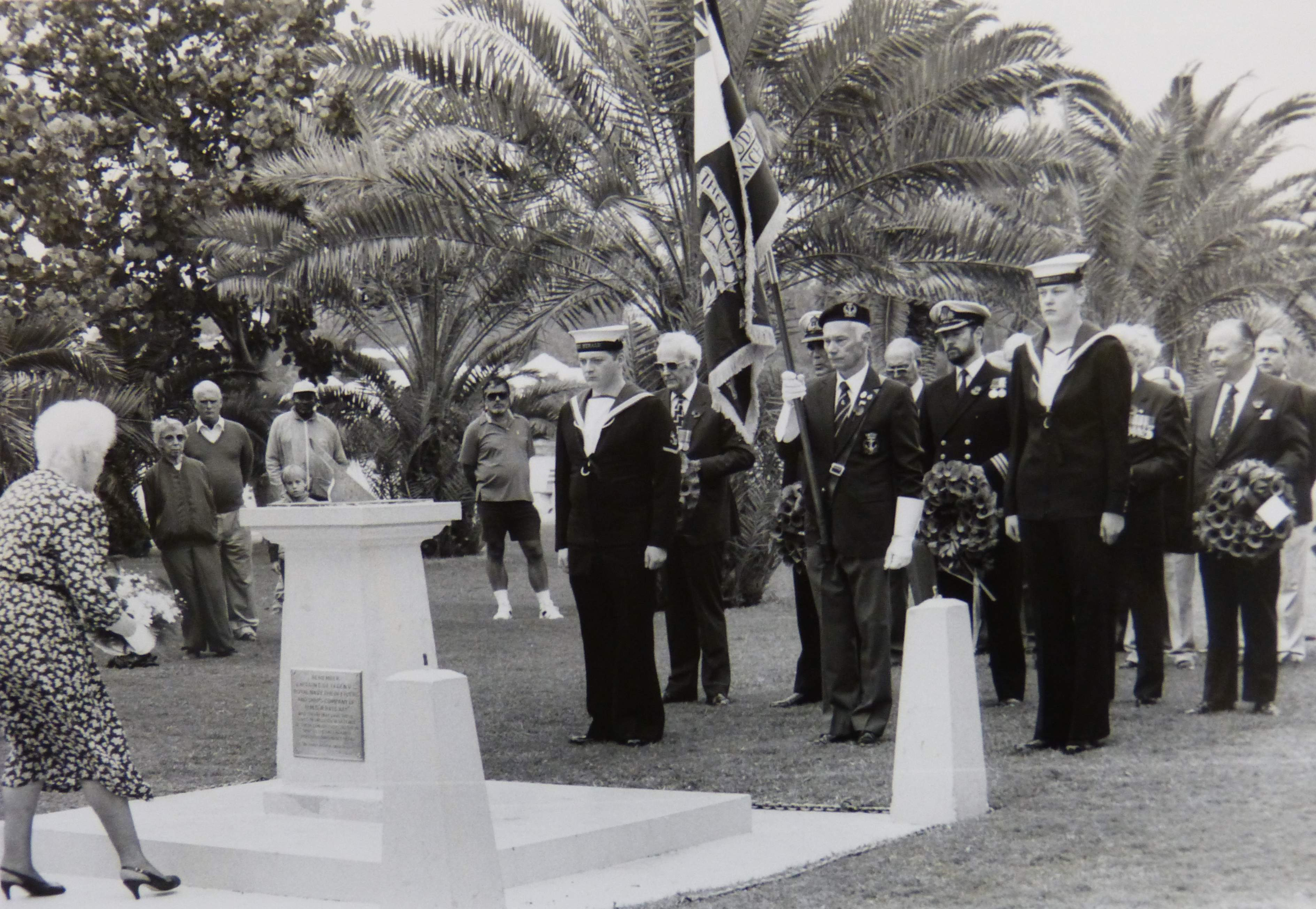
RNA Bermuda Branch, HMS Malabar, and Sea Cadet Remembrance Day ceremony at HMS Jervis Bay memorial at Hamilton, Bermuda.

The Royal Naval Association (RNA) is a British charity and membership organisation for current and former British Naval Service personnel – the Royal Navy, Royal Marines, Women's Royal Naval Service, Queen Alexandra's Royal Naval Nursing Service, Royal Naval Reserve, Royal Marines Reserve, Royal Fleet Auxiliary, Royal Naval Auxiliary Service and Merchant Navy veterans holding the Merchant Navy Association Veterans Badge, as well as their relatives and supporters. It was formed in 1950 from a number of earlier naval old comrades' associations and was granted a Royal charter in 1954. Its central office is at HMNB Portsmouth, and it operates through a network of local branches in the United Kingdom and overseas.

== History ==
=== Origins ===
Before 1950, a number of naval clubs and associations had grown up around the country out of the wish of former sailors to keep alive the comradeship of life in the Royal Navy. Chief among these was the Royal Naval Old Comrades Association (RNOCA), some of whose branches dates from before the Second World War. Individual branches illustrate the pattern, the Southern branch was founded in 1938 as an RNOCA branch, and the Torbay branch, established in 1945, became part of the RNA in 1950.

=== Formation and charter ===
The RNA was formed in 1950, effectively as a successor to the RNOCA, with an aim of creating a single "one for all" organisation. Unlike the RNOCA it was open to serving as well as former personnel, in order to foster close links between the active Navy and those who had previously served, and it was intended to include all ranks and ratings and all branches and specialisations of the Naval Service, including the Royal Marines the QARNNS, the WRNS and the reserves.

The association was incorporated by Royal Charter on 15 July 1954, and a supplemental Charter followed on 26 May 1990. The Charter set out its objects to and rules, which the association has amended over time as its governance has changed. The RNA is also registered with the Charity Commission for England and Wales (charity number 266982), having registered in 1974.

== Objects and activities ==
The charitable objects set out in the charter include furthering the efficiency and well being of the Naval service, preserving its traditions and encouraging recruitment. Branch and association literature also describes its work as fostering comradeship, providing meeting opportunities, remembrance relief of hardship and distress and welfare assistance and signposting.

== Remembrance ==
Remembrance is a major part of the RNA's public activity. The association maintains a Garden of Remembrance, and branches are invited to place crosses there and to attend the Field of Remembrance. In 2025, the year of its 75th anniversary, about 120 RNA members marched past the Cenotaph on Remembrance Sunday, which the association described as its largest contingent to date. The then National Chairman, Andy Christie, laid a wreath on behalf of members. Branches also take part in local ceremonies such as D-Day commemorations and Armed Forces Day parades.

== Welfare and social activity ==
The RNA provides social events, support during the transition from naval to civilian life and signposting to welfare services for members, and its branches raise funds for military charities cadet forces and other causes.

== Organisation ==
The RNA's central office is at Lanyard House, HMNB Portsmouth. It is governed by trustees under its Royal Charter and rules, with a National Council and an annual national conference with recent conferences being held i places such us Liverpool and Cardiff. The association has a National Chairman and a Chief Executive. Membership is organised through local branches. The association has reported different totals at different dates, In 2023 it described itself as having over 11,000 members in over 250 branches in the United Kingdom and overseas, and in 2025 as having nearly 25,000 members in more than 240 branches worldwide.

== Relationship with other bodies ==
The RNA has a partnering arrangement with the Royal Navy that recognises it as an organisation delivering benefit to defence. Its website lists linked association, including the Conference of Naval Associations (CONA), the Fleet Air Arm Association and the Association of Wrens.

== See also ==
- Royal Naval Sailing Association
- Royal British Legion
