= Parallax Graphics =

American computer hardware manufacturer

Parallax Graphics, Inc.
- Industry: Computer graphics
- Founded: November 1982; 44 years ago in Sunnyvale, California
- Founder: Martin "Marty" Picco (co-founder)
- Defunct: November 30, 1998; 27 years ago
- Fate: Bankruptcy
- Products: Display adapters and software
- Number of employees: 40 (1987)
- Parent: Dynatech Corporation (1989–1998)
- Website: parallax.com at the Wayback Machine (archived 1996-11-13)

Parallax Graphics, Inc., was an American developer and manufacturer of high-specification computer graphics cards for various platforms, and of supporting software. The company was founded in 1982 as Parallax Systems by two Cornell University graduates.

== History ==
Parallax Graphics was founded as Parallax Systems in November 1982 by two Cornell University graduates, including Martin "Marty" Picco. The company's first products were built on the duo's electrical engineering thesis paper and were developed and testbenched from within one of their garages. They soon hired five other engineers, all former employees of graphics controller manufacturers. Parallax soon moved into a proper office building in Sunnyvale, California, by mid-1983. The founding duo lacked business and marketing acumen, and hired a chief executive officer to manage the company that year.

The company's first product family is the Rampage Graphics Terminal. The initial entry, the 600 Series, and was unveiled at the National Computer Graphics Association Conference in mid-1983 at the McCormick Place in Chicago, Illinois. Rampage is a color graphics controller designed around a proprietary bit-slicing drawing processor capable of drawing 12 million pixels per second. Its instruction set comprises 85 primitives, including single operations for polygon, box, circle, and vector drawing commands, and modes for opaqueness–transparency, solid flood fill, stippling, outlining, and cut-and-pasting. It was released initially for Digital Equipment Corporation's Q-Bus–based computers and was lauded for its high speed. The company later developed in 1984 a variant of Rampage, the 1000 Series, for Multibus systems and for Q-Bus. This rendition of Rampage increased the drawing operations per second speed to 88 million.

Starting with the 1200 Series in 1986, Parallax dropped the Rampage name and began developing entries in the yet unnamed family around VLSI CMOS gate arrays, with the 1280 Series possessing one and the 1280 Series possessing three. The 1280 Series is compatible with Q-Bus machines and IBM PC compatibles. It can display graphics at 1280 × 1024 pixels, and has a mode emulating NTSC video at 640 × 482 pixels. In windowed mode, the card can generate real-time NTSC video at 30 frames per second; in fullscreen mode at NTSC resolution, the card can generate 60 FPS video.

In February 1984, the company renamed from Parallax Systems to Parallax Graphics and raised US$1.75 million in venture capital from Hambrecht & Quist and Bay Partners. In May 1989, Dynatech Corporation of Burlington, Massachusetts, announced its acquisition of Parallax Graphics for an undisclosed sum. Dynatech had purchased Cromemco the year before. Parallax remained an independent subsidiary of Dynatech, and in July 1989, it contracted with Sony Microsystems of Palo Alto, California, to license the Viper VMEbus display adapter for Sony's NEWS Unix workstation.

By 1993, Parallax targeted its products at the burgeoning video on demand (VOD) segment of the media industry, and business and engineering teleconferencing, telemedicine, and video editing workstations. Its primary technology to this end was VideoStream, which they adapted to PowerVideo, and MultiVideo, XVideo to the specific segments they targeted. XVideo, featuring a 24-bit-color framebuffer, was particularly popular in medicine, scientific research (for experimental models), finances (for real-time tracking of stock tickers), and government markets. PowerVideo and MultiVideo—JPEG-lossy-compressed and uncompressed EISA video boards respectively—had previously been popular for teleconferencing and VOD. Initially developed for Sun Microsystems's SPARCstation, Parallax ported its VideoStream-based products for the HP 9000 in late 1993. Parallax's VideoStream products were described as highly portable due to their basis in the Motif widget toolkit. Following a pact with IBM for the development of VideoStream products for the PowerPC architecture (which IBM had co-engineered within the AIM alliance), XVideo was soon ported to IBM PC Power Series workstations running the AIX operating system, and Parallax later added support for the Solaris OS.

Dynatech Corporation shut down Parallax Graphics on November 30, 1998. The parent company continued to support RMA requests on Parallax's products until December 31, 1999. Dynatech renamed to Acterna Corporation sometime between then and 2003, when it filed for Chapter 11 bankruptcy.

== Legacy ==
One of Parallax Graphics's 40 employees in 1987 was Mike Judge, who proceeded to a successful career in animation and live-action film and television, creating the television series Beavis and Butt-Head and King of the Hill. Hired as a test engineer, Judge described his employment as particularly unpleasant: "The people I met were like Stepford Wives. They were true believers in something, and I don't know what it was." He recalled one reluctant coworker refusing to relinquish schematics over concern that Judge might fail to return it, which Wired compared to the character of Milton in Judge's feature film Office Space (1999). He quit after only three months. He called Parallax a distant influence on his HBO workplace comedy Silicon Valley, and a more direct influence on Office Space.
