= Ordnance Island =

Island within the limits of St. George's Town, Bermuda

- Bermuda
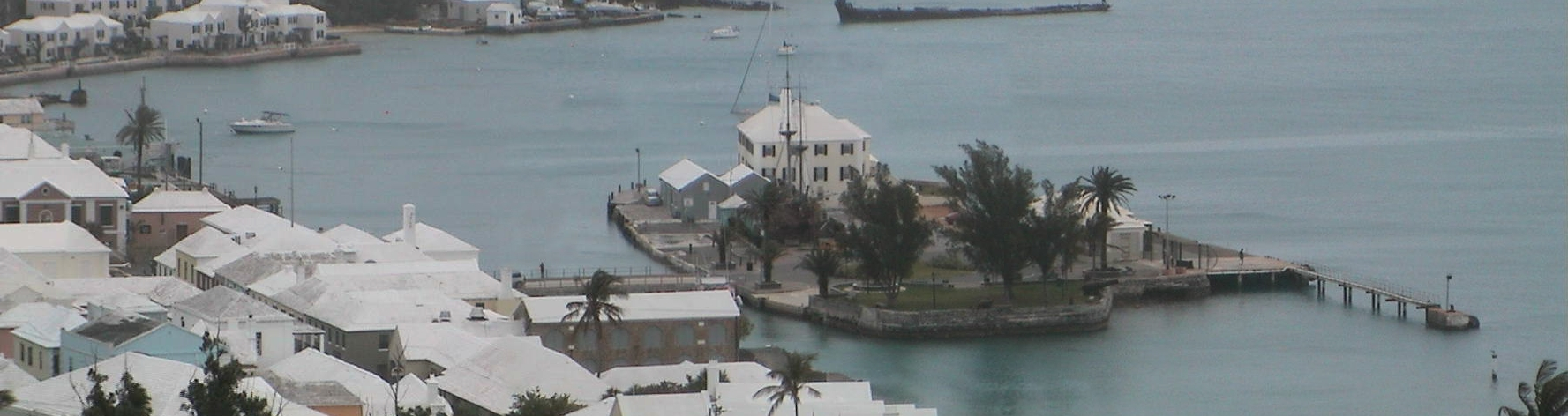
- St. George's Town, Bermuda, with Ordnance Island visible at the centre of the photograph

Site information
- Type: Barracks
- Owner: Government of Bermuda

Location
- Location in Bermuda
- Coordinates: 32°22′49″N 64°40′35″W

Site history
- Built: 19th century
- Built for: War Office

Ordnance Island is located within the limits of St. George's Town, Bermuda. It lies close to the shore opposite the town square (King's Square), in St. George's Harbour.

== History ==
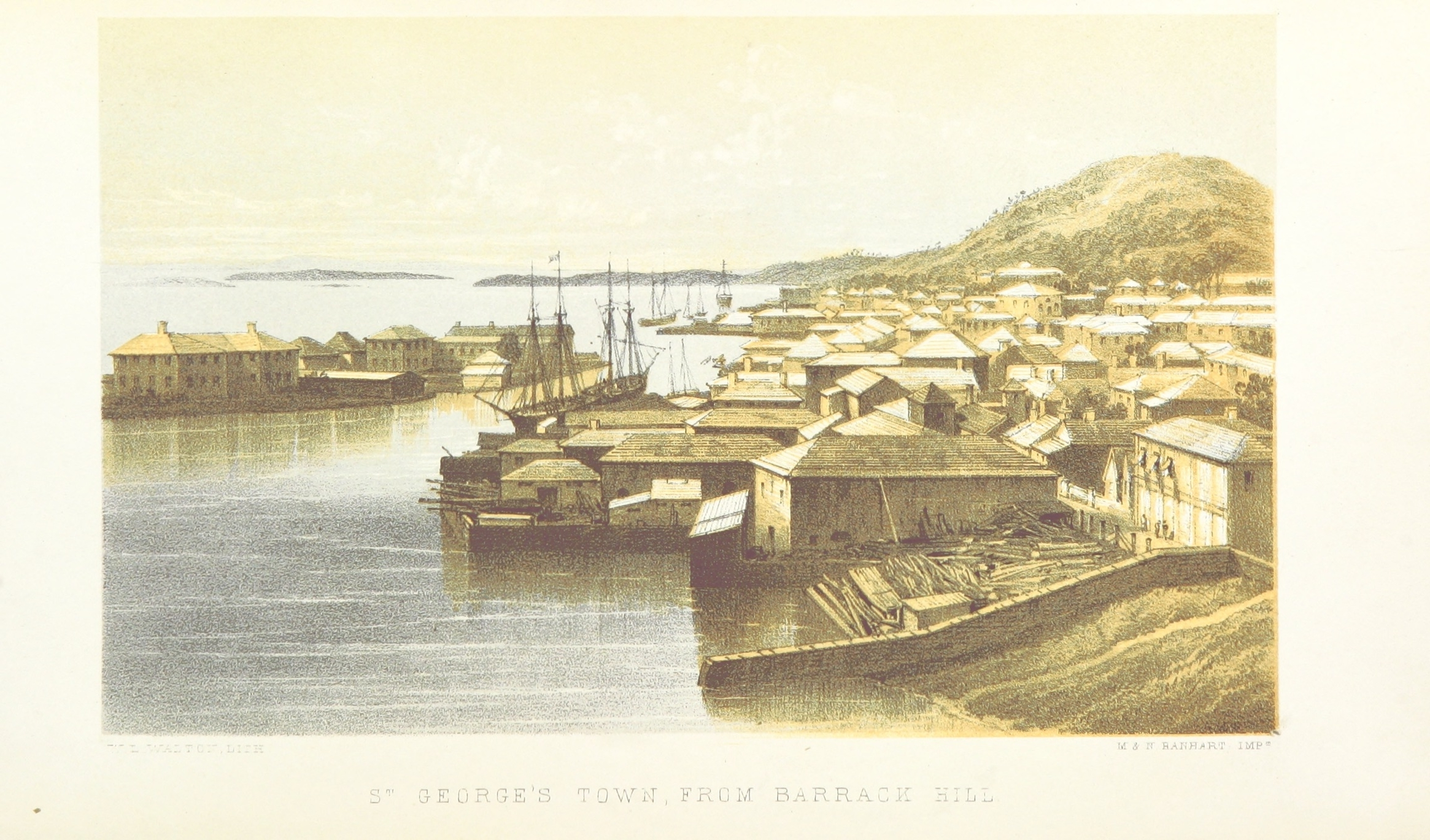
St. George's Town, from Barrack Hill, in 1857, with Ordnance Island at left

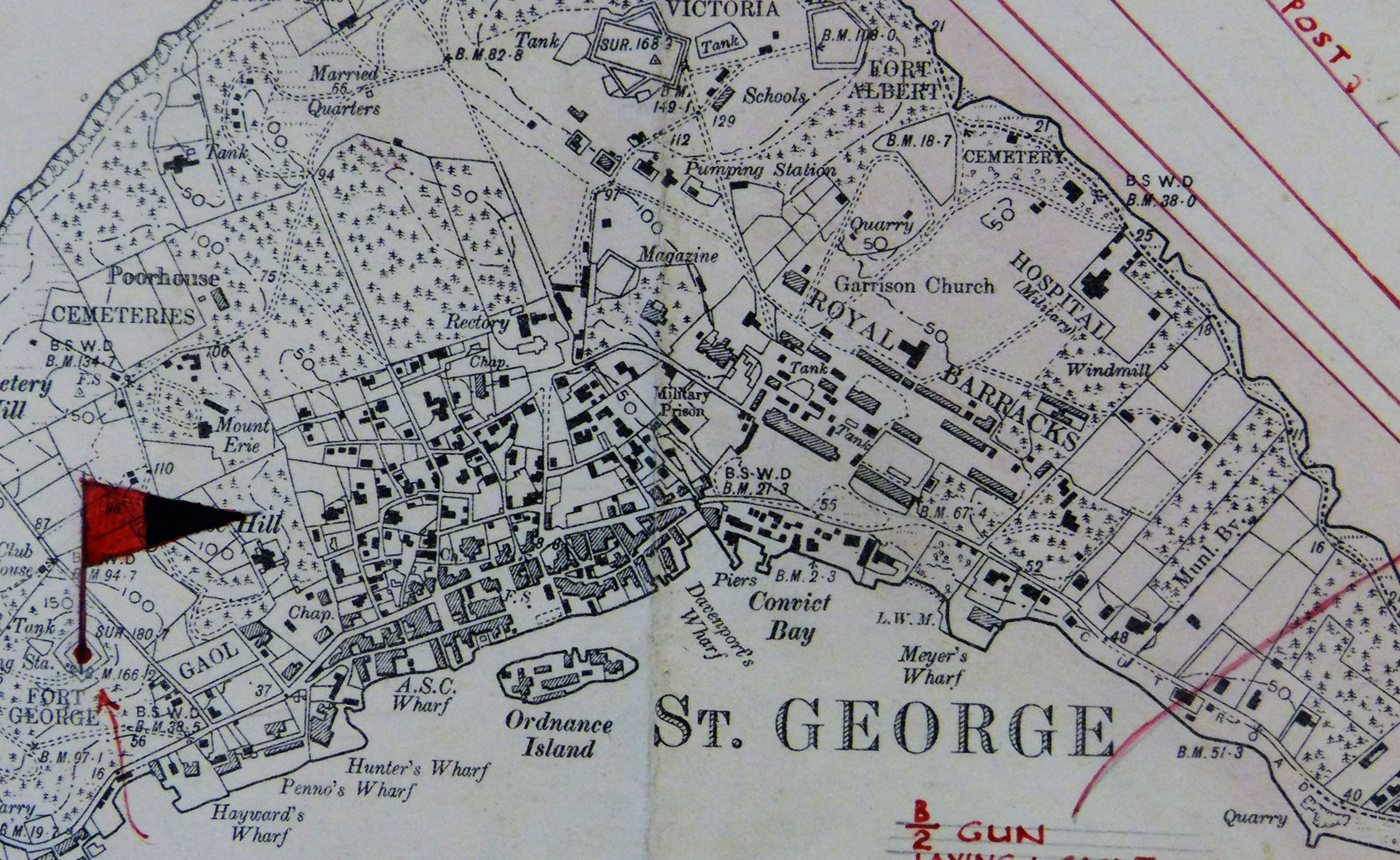
Map of St. George's Town and Garrison, including Ordnance Island, ca. 1899

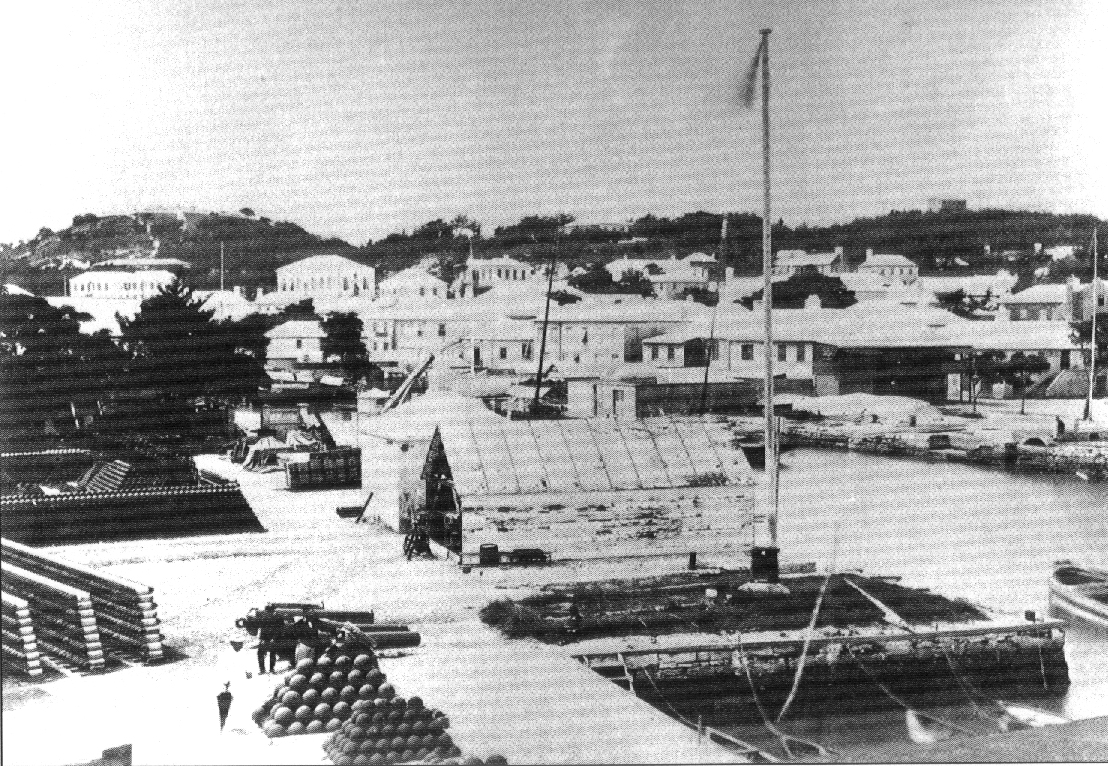
Shells stacked on Ordnance Island

The only island in the town, it covers just 1.75 acres (7,100 m^{2}) and was created by reclaiming the land between several small islands which were once situated there. The original islands of Ducking Stool, Frazer's and Gallows were used in the early days of the colony for executions.

Ordnance Island became a Royal Army Ordnance Corps (RAOC) depot in the 19th century, supplying gunpowder to forts and artillery batteries around St. George's. Prior to this, munitions had been kept within the town (as at the time of the "Bermuda Gunpowder Plot" in 1775, when 100 barrels of gunpowder were stolen by Bermudans sympathetic to the Continental Congress and sent to the rebellious Americans during the American War of Independence), and on Hen Island, further out in St. George's Harbour. An accidental detonation on Hen Island resulting from a lightning strike broke windows throughout St. George's on 1 November 1812. Ordnance Island is far closer to the town, and a similar explosion here would have been catastrophic. The RAOC operated a second, smaller depot, from a wharf on East Broadway on the outskirts of Hamilton. By the Second World War, the depot had fallen into disuse with the Army and was part of a 99-year lease granted by the United Kingdom to the United States for use as a submarine base from 1942 to 1945.

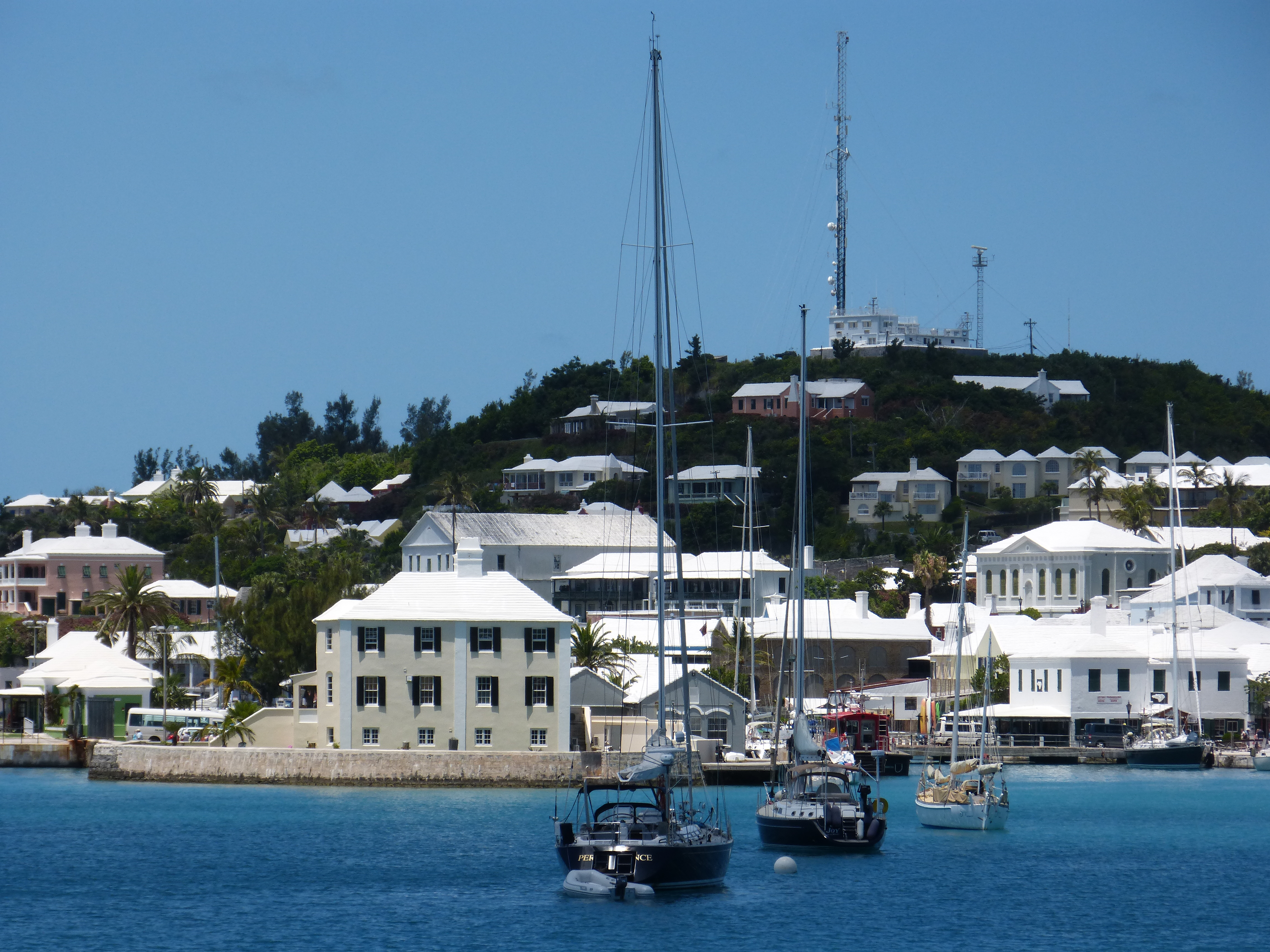
Ordnance Island and St. George's Town, overlooked by Fort George.

The channel between Ordnance Island and the King's Square was not bridged until after the Second World War. The island is visible as a location in the 1962 film That Touch of Mink, with Cary Grant and Doris Day. At the time, the bridge was clearly wooden. Today, the island is joined to St. George's Island by a concrete bridge.

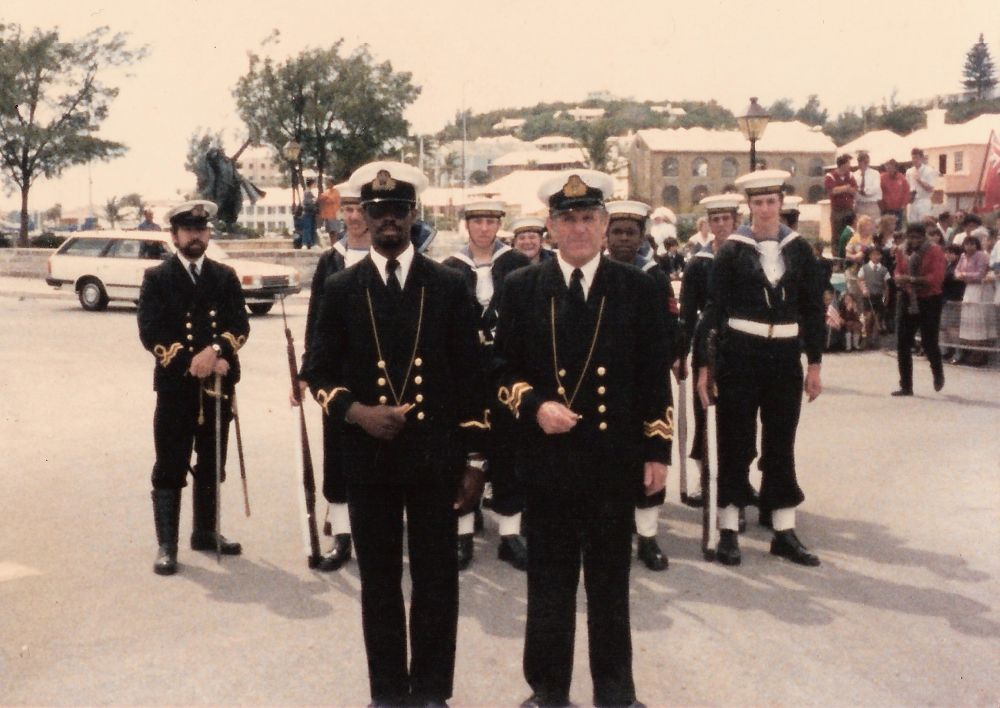
Guard of TS Admiral Somers, the Bermuda Sea Cadet Corps unit of St. George's, parades on Ordnance Island to greet the yacht American Promise in 1986.

Most of the buildings erected by the Army and the US Navy have been razed. One large Army building (the Storekeeper's House) remained and was refurbished as offices for the Corporation of St. George. The only other buildings on the island are an office of HM Customs used to clear visiting yachts, and a new cruise ship terminal. There is, however, a prominent replica of the Deliverance located on the island. The original was one of the two ships built by the survivors of the Sea Venture, flagship of the Virginia Company, which was wrecked in Bermuda in 1609, accidentally beginning Bermuda's settlement.

Ordnance Island was the starting and finishing point of Dodge Morgan's record-breaking 1985–1986 non-stop, solo circumnavigation of the planet aboard the American Promise.

The Major Donald H. (Bob) Burns Memorial Park on the island includes the Desmond Hale Fountain statue of Admiral Sir George Somers (credited as the founder of Bermuda, and at the helm of the Sea Venture when she was driven on the reefs) which was unveiled by Princess Margaret, Countess of Snowdon in 1984, during the 375th anniversary of the shipwrecking. The Memorial Park was unveiled on 20 April 1997 during the Twinning Ceremonies with Lyme Regis.

== See also ==
- United States Navy submarine bases
- World War II United States Merchant Navy
