= Dodge Morgan =

Dodge David Morgan
- Dodge Morgan (photograph from the Portland Press Herald)
- Born: January 15, 1932; Malden, Massachusetts, U.S.
- Died: September 14, 2010 (aged 78); Boston, Massachusetts, U.S.
- Occupation: Entrepreneur
- Known for: First American to sail solo around the globe with no stops

Dodge David Morgan (January 15, 1932 – September 14, 2010) was an American sailor, businessman, publisher and "self-proclaimed contrarian." He flew fighter jets in the U.S. Air Force in the early 1950s, worked as a newspaper reporter in Alaska, and became a millionaire by operating Controlonics, a company that manufactured Whistler radar detectors from 1971 to 1983. He gained fame in 1986 as the first American to sail solo around the world with no stops; Dodge was the third person to ever accomplish the feat and set eleven world records during his voyage including the fastest ever solo, non-stop circumnavigation. He also set a world record for eastward sailing when he completed his journey in 150 days, cutting the prior record of 292 days nearly in half. He spent his later years living on a 30-acre island that he purchased in 1998 in Maine's Quahog Harbor.

== Early years ==
Morgan was born in Malden, Massachusetts, in 1932. His father, Russell Morgan, was a pharmacist who died when Morgan was two years old. His mother, Ruth Dodge Morgan remarried, and Morgan recalled having "quite a happy life" with his new family. He described himself as "a lousy student" who devoted most of his time to "sports and other such activities." He also worked at his uncle's boatyard on Cape Cod as a teenager.

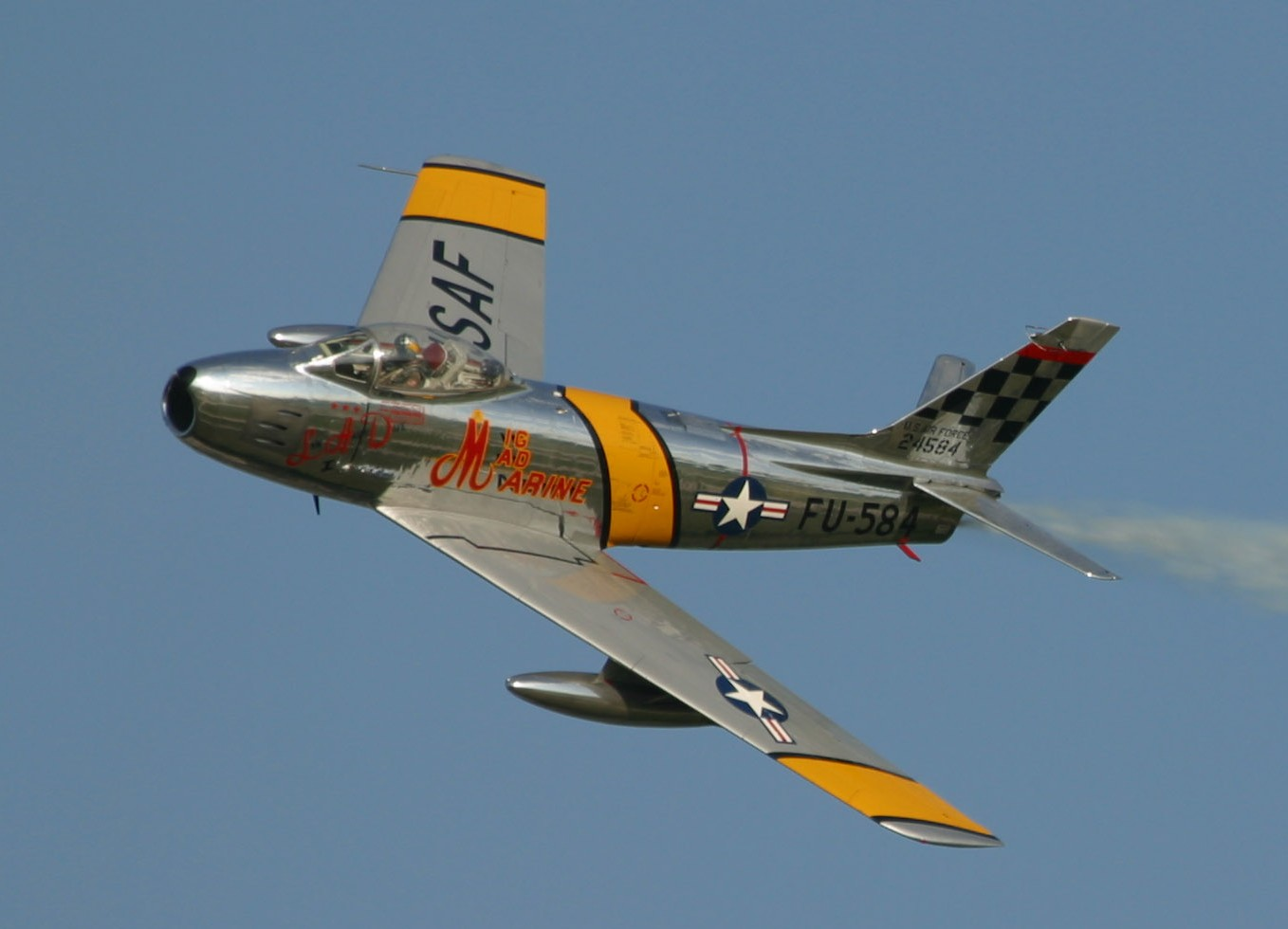
F-86 Sabre fighter jet

On reaching adulthood, Morgan joined the United States Air Force and flew jet fighters. He joined the Air Force, he said, "so I wouldn't have to tell my mother I got kicked out of college." While serving in the Air Force, he once crashed his F-86 Sabre fighter jet. Morgan later recalled that he was trying to land at Presque Isle Air Force Base when his engine flamed out and the plane crashed into the Maine woods. His canopy jammed, and rescuers had to extricate him with an ax. Asked about the threat of fire from the fuel tanks in the jet's wings, Morgan said, "No problem, the wings were about 300 yards behind me when the fuselage finally stopped."

After being discharged from the Air Force, Morgan attended Boston University, where he received a degree in journalism. He briefly married Lael Warren (Morgan) while they were both at BU. They moved to Alaska and worked as reporters for the Anchorage Daily News.

'Morgan returned to Massachusetts and headed his own advertising and public relations firm. He saved enough money to buy a 36-foot wooden schooner named Coaster. He sailed the 'Coaster' from Maine to Alaska with stops at the Virgin Islands, the Panama Canal and Hawaii. Morgan recalled that, after buying the boat, "I never slept ashore for 2-1/2 years." Coaster was sold in Alaska and Dodge returned to Massachusetts.

== Controlonics ==
In 1971, Morgan formed Controlonics Corporation in Westford, Massachusetts. The company manufactured and marketed many early radio frequency devices, early radar and their most successful Whistler radar detector. He started the company with a $5,000 loan and built it "from three people in a garage to 300 people." Interviewed in 2005, Morgan said that, after his children, the accomplishment that made him proudest was "the culture of openness that I felt responsible for at my company. It was even more important than our financial success. There was a culture that accepted and celebrated individual eccentricities." Morgan sold Controlonics to Dynatech of Burlington, Massachusetts, in December 1983 for a sum between $32 million and $35 million.

== Journey of American Promise ==
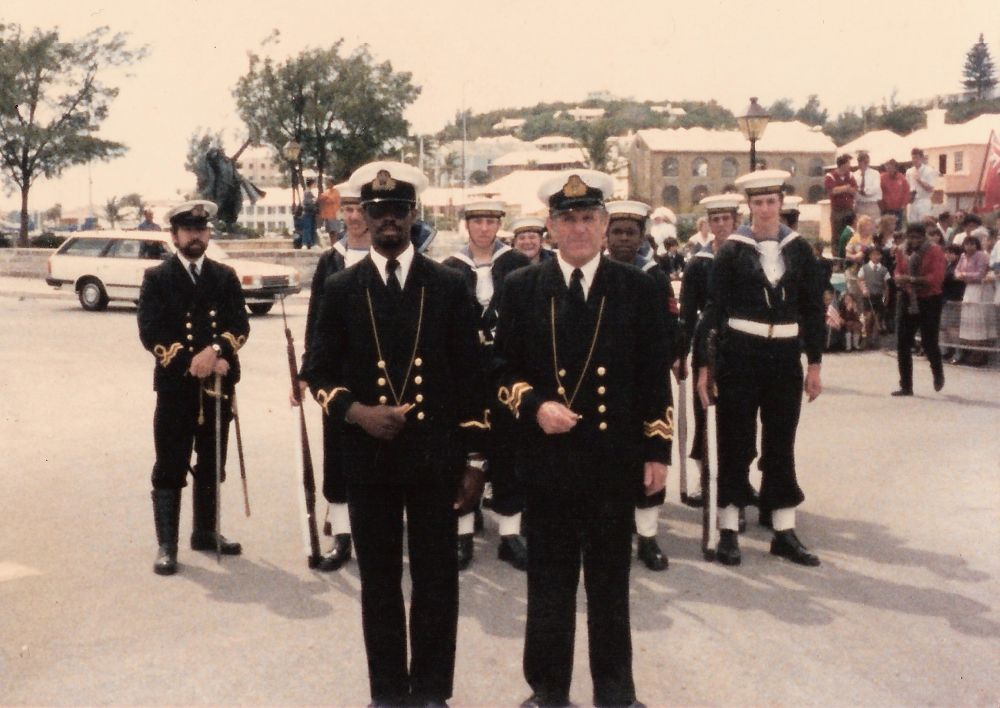
Honour guard provided by TS Admiral Somers, Bermuda Sea Cadet Corps awaiting the arrival of Dodge Morgan and the American Promise on Ordnance Island, on the 11 April 1986

Morgan made a promise to himself in the early 1960s that he would one day sail around the world. He sold Controlonics to "follow a dream I had years before on the old schooner, to sail around the world on a boat which was designed for that."

In 1985, at age 53, he embarked his journey around the world on the 60-foot cutter American Promise. The boat was designed by 1974 America's Cup winner Ted Hood. Hood recalled that the boat was designed for safety and redundancy rather than speed: "Everyone said there's no way that boat is going to get around the world in record speed, but it did."

Morgan commissioned The New Film Company, Inc. of Boston, Massachusetts, to produce a film about his journey. Producer Christopher G. Knight placed six film cameras on "American Promise," three above deck and three below. One in each set was programmed to come on twice a day during daylight hours and run for 30 seconds, thus enabling Morgan to film himself. He used the cameras as a film log and shot over 9 hours of film that was ultimately edited into the 57-minute film, 'AROUND ALONE.

Morgan departed from Ordnance Island, in St. George's, Bermuda, on November 12, 1985, and returned there on April 11, 1986, completing the journey in 150 days, 1 hour, and 6 minutes. As the American Promise sailed into St. George's Harbour, Morgan's project manager, Grant Robinson, noted that the boat looked spit-and-polished. He radioed, " "She doesn't look any the worse for wear at all. We see you've still got some paint on her." Morgan replied, "What do you mean 'some paint on her'? She's only been used once."

As Morgan disembarked, his wife, Manny, and his two children, Hoyt David and Kimberley Promise, embraced in a family hug that was cut short when he was handed his favorite food, a cheeseburger. He told the crowd that had gathered to greet him: "It takes three things to sail around the world alone. A good boat, an iron will and luck. To do so in record time takes a great boat, an iron will and extraordinary luck. And, my friends, here is a great boat."

Morgan joked that his most frightening moment came "when I pulled the next-to-last bottle of beer from the bilge." But his journey brought real dangers, including a tropical storm in the South Pacific that battered the boat with 70-mile-per-hour winds for three days.

Morgan was the third person and the first American to sail solo around the globe with no stops. At the time, Sports Illustrated reported, "Only [two] men before Morgan -- none of them American -- had sailed around the world alone without stopping. No taking on additional food or water; no assistance accepted from another vessel; no using the motor for propulsion." In making the journey in 150 days, Morgan shattered the prior record of 292 days set in 1971 by English sailor Chay Blyth. (Note Blyth's voyage in British Steel was "Westabout" against the prevailing winds.)

Morgan wrote about his voyage in a book titled "The Voyage of American Promise," published by Houghton Mifflin in 1989. AROUND ALONE, the 57-minute film produced by The New Film Company, Inc. about his around-the-world journey was the first featured film in the PBS series, "Adventure." It first aired in March 1987.

Morgan's voyage was also the focus of a series of psychological papers, including an entire issue of the Journal of Personality devoted to analyzing Morgan's life, his experience of the voyage, and the ways in which it may have affected his personality development.

== Publisher ==
In 1985, Morgan moved to Cape Elizabeth, Maine. He purchased the alternative weekly newspaper the Maine Times in 1985 and also purchased the Casco Bay Weekly, an alternative newspaper in Portland, Maine, in 1990. In 2002, the Casco Bay Weekly stopped publishing. Morgan began by laying off much of the staff, noting at the time that the newspaper had been losing money for about a year. When the paper was finally shut down, Morgan said, "I don't want to get in the Guinness Book of World Records for money buried in a small-market weekly newspaper."

== Family and later years ==
Morgan's first marriage was brief and ended in divorce. He married his second wife, Manny, in 1972, and they had two children, Kimberly Promise and Hoyt David. Morgan's second marriage also ended in divorce, but after a rewarding and loving family was built. All four remained very close.

In 1998, Morgan purchased Snow Island in Harpswell, Maine. He commissioned Portland architect Winton Scott to design a home for him on the island. In a feature story, the Boston Globe described Morgan's island as "30 acres of dense cedar forest and fragrant fern, spongy moss and scaly lichen, cattail bog and rockweed shore smack in the middle of Quahog Bay." In 1999, the Maine chapter of the American Institute of Architects gave the compound a design award and called it "a triumph of programmatic virtue in a natural setting that demands nothing less." For the next 12 years, Morgan lived on his 30-acre island sanctuary where he moored six boats of various types. In 2005, he told a reporter, "I live alone here on Snow Island. In one sense, I am quite pleased with my solitary life. I engage with people I love and admire, one-on-one, with an intense joy." Most recently, he lived on Snow Island with his fiancée, Mary Beth Teas.

In September 2010, Morgan died at age 78 from complications from cancer surgery at Brigham and Women's Hospital in Boston, Massachusetts.

== Selected works ==
- The Voyage of American Promise (Houghton Mifflin 1989)
- Around Alone (The New Film Company, Inc.: 1987)
