= Dynatech =

Defunct American technology company

Acterna Corporation
- Formerly: Microtech Research Corporation (1959 – c. 1969); Dynatech Corporation (c. 1969 – 2000)
- Industry: Technology
- Founded: 1959; 67 years ago in Burlington, Massachusetts, United States
- Founders: Warren M. Rohsenow; J. P. Barger
- Defunct: 2005; 21 years ago
- Fate: Acquired by JDS Uniphase
- Number of employees: 3,156 (1992, peak)
- Parent: Clayton, Dubilier & Rice (1997–2005)

Dynatech Corporation, originally Microtech Research Corporation, was an American technology corporation originally based in Burlington, Massachusetts. The company owned a wide variety of manufacturing subsidiaries across multiple industries, including biomedical equipment, video and broadcast hardware and software, scientific instrumentation, and telecommunications testing, among others. It was founded by 1959 by a pair of MIT researchers and soon grew into a multifaceted corporation, helped along by dozens of acquisitions of small niche manufacturers across the United States.

At its peak in the early 1990s, the company posted over $500 million in sales, largely generated from its video and telecommunications businesses. Following poor performance in the mid-1990s, the company divested many of its redundant businesses, culminating in its purchase by a private equity company in 1997. In 2000, it began trading as Acterna Corporation. The company was acquired by JDS Uniphase in 2005 and folded.

== History ==
=== Foundation and early success (1959–1978) ===
Dynatech was founded as Microtech Research Corporation in 1959 by Warren M. Rohsenow and J. P. Barger. Prior to founding Microtech, Rohsenow was a professor at the Massachusetts Institute of Technology (MIT) where he taught mechanical engineering and headed MIT's Heat Transfer Laboratory. Barger was a graduate student of Rohsenow who later joined MIT faculty and aided Rohsenow in his efforts to provide research and development services to governmental and industrial clients wanting to make use of heat-transfer technology. Microtech was founded to commercialize their services. In the early 1960s, the two pivoted Microtech from being a consulting business to being a manufacturer of precision electronics. Deviating from the advice of their colleagues to develop a singularly focused but strong scientific product line, Rohsenow and Barger opted to instead diversify, setting their sights on the medical equipment and data communications fields on top of myriad scientific instruments.

Microtech's first successful product in the field of data communications was a patch panel system called the Multi-Circuit Jack, released in the early 1960s and later renamed the Dyna-Patch. It supported a number of connector types and protocols through a system of adapters, allowing signals to be broken down into constituent parts for more efficient data transfers. Microtech's breakthrough product in the medical sector was an innovative liquid handling system aiding in the dilution of blood serum samples with reagents in precise amounts on the order of microliters. The system allowed laboratory technicians to perform biological and immunological tests with a greater degree of precision. By the end of the 1960s, the company had renamed itself to Dynatech and was worth US$5 million.

Dynatech's steady growth was helped along by the acquisition of small companies specializing in niche interests, starting in 1968 with the publicly traded Cooke Engineering Company of Alexandria, Virginia. In 1977, Dynatech purchased a majority stake in Artek Systems Corporation, a maker of medical instruments based in Farmingdale, New York, which specialized in automated, video-based colony counters. In the late 1970s, Dynatech introduced the MIC-2000, a relatively inexpensive microplate analyzer used by physicians to derive optimal dosages of antibiotics. By 1979, Dynatech's medical equipment division accounted for roughly $13.8 million of the company's $27.5 million in revenue that year, compared to $9.2 million generated by the company's data communications division. The company during the early Reagan administration suffered losses in the scientific instrumentation and R&D division, largely due to the downsizing of the Department of Energy and the Occupational Safety and Health Administration (as well as the undercurrent of the early 1980s recession), but made strong gains in the medical and data communications sectors. After a brief period of losses, Dynatech's revenue recovered to $27.5 million in 1983.

=== Data communication and broadcasting (1978–1991) ===
In 1978, Dynatech formed a fourth division of the company, Utah Scientific, centered on broadcasting technology. This division, as well as their data communications business, eclipsed Dynatech's medical division starting in the mid-1980s, helped along by numerous diverse acquisitions of technology companies serving niche markets. The broadcasting and data communications sectors represented two-thirds of the company's $147 million annuals sales figure for 1984. Notable among Dynatech's acquisitions in these fields were of Weather Central and ColorGraphics, makers of computer meteorology systems and computerized weather graphics systems for broadcasters, in late 1982. In 1984, the company completed their acquisition of Controlonics Corporation, a maker of radio frequency devices which specialized in radar detectors, from Dodge Morgan for roughly $35 million. In November 1985, Dynatech purchased Quanta Corporation, a manufacturer of character generators and video effects units (later renamed Delta in the 1990s). Dynatech's acquisitions continued apace throughout the late 1980s, the company acquiring a total of 53 companies between 1977 and 1987. According to Ronald O. Bub, whose semiconductor company Trigon Industries was acquired by Dynatech during this period, Rohsenow and Barger allowed their subsidiaries a high degree of autonomy, while threatening divestiture should they not meet Dynatech's bottom line.

Between January and March 1987, Dynatech acquired Cromemco, Inc., a pioneering microcomputer and digital imaging corporation founded in 1974 in Mountain View, California. Cromemco had been a mainstay of early Silicon Valley and was lauded for its self-reliance and eschewing of venture capital. It encountered heavy losses in the 1980s, however, with sales shrinking down to $10 million by early 1987, from a high of $50 million. Cromemco survived as a subsidiary of Dynatech, who allowed Cromemco to retain their name. Cromemco's owners opted to rename themselves to Dynatech Computer Systems, however, on the strength of Dynatech's name and to shield the company from associations with Cromemco's widely reported decline. Following the acquisition of Cromemco, Dynatech's Utah Scientific division purchased VTA Technologies, makers of the da Vinci line of telecine and videotape color correction bays, in April 1987; and Parallax Graphics of Sunnyvale, California, a maker of advanced graphics cards for minicomputers and workstations, in May 1989.

=== Faltering, sale to private equity, and renaming (1991–2003) ===
Rohsenow retired as full-time chairman of Dynatech in June 1991, with Barger (at that point the company's CEO) taking his seat. Despite his retirement, Rohsenow remained on the board of directors as honorary chairman. John F. Reno simultaneously succeeded Barger as president of Dynatech; he joined the company in 1974, becoming chief operating officer in 1987. Dynatech's sales peaked at over $500 million in fiscal year 1992, at which point the company spanned 40 subsidiaries across the globe.

Despite its consistent sales successes, the company's profits began shrinking in the early 1990s, and in 1993, Dynatech recorded its first annual loss, posting a net loss of roughly $30 million. Dynatech's shareholders charged the company with over-diversifying, with excessive amount of product lines across an excessive number of market segments, and threatened a hostile takeover of the company. In order to satisfy their shareholders, Dynatech undertook a massive restructuring of the company in 1994, dividing the company into two segments: Information Support Products (representing Dynatech's video, data, and voice communications portfolio) and Diversified Instrumentation (representing the company's diversified electronics and video editing hardware and software portfolio). The split was concomitant with the divestiture of numerous subsidiaries, including Whistler Corporation, a maker of car alarm and radar detector equipment that was one of Dynatech's largest and most profitable subsidiaries. In February 1996, Utah Scientific was spun-off from Dynatech into its own separate corporation, with only da Vinci Systems being retained by Dynatech. In the same month, the company sold its medical equipment division to Thermo Electron of Waltham, Massachusetts. Utah Scientific was acquired by Artel Video Systems, a spin-off of 3Com, in April 1997 for an undisclosed sum.

Logo of Acterna Corporation, used from 2000 to 2005

After completing its divestiture program, Dynatech was down to its final divisions, comprising their namesake business, which sold networking test equipment; da Vinci Systems, which sold color-correction hardware and software; Airshow, Inc., which delivered real-time video feeds of flight information and news headlines to airline passengers; Itronix, which sold mobile data terminals; ICS Advent, which sold single-board industrial computers; and Dataviews, which sold X terminals. In December 1997, Dynatech was acquired by the private equity company Clayton, Dubilier & Rice, for US$900 million. Its stock ticker was subsequently taken to the over-the-counter market. In February 2000, Dynatech's TTC Corporation subsidiary announced the acquisition of Wavetek Wandel Goltermann, then the second-largest manufacturer of laboratory test equipment, for $600 million. In June 2000, Dynatech acquired Superior Electronics Group, a maker of cable television testing equipment for $152 million, merging it with TTC and Wavetek in May 2000 to form Cheetah Technologies. In that same month, Dynatech was renamed to Acterna Corporation and began trading on the Nasdaq the following month.

=== Bankruptcy and acquisition (2003–2005) ===
By early 2003, Acterna had relocated to Germantown, Maryland, and had racked up nearly $1 billion in debt. In May that year, the company filed for Chapter 11 bankruptcy. It emerged from bankruptcy in October 2003, following a reorganization that saw some of their debt swapped for equity and the company delisting itself from the Nasdaq, going private. In May 2005, JDS Uniphase acquired Acterna for $760 million in cash and stock, folding Acterna into JDS.
