= Personal Clothing System =

Personal Clothing System is the name of the current combat uniform of the British Armed Forces. This comes in Multi-Terrain Pattern camouflage and gradually replaced the CS95/DPM uniform.

== Royal Navy Personal Clothing System (RNPCS) ==
The PCS No. 4 uniform worn by the Royal Navy, in plain navy blue, was unveiled in March 2015.

== See also ==
- Combat uniform
- Disruptive Pattern Material
