= American Promise (yacht) =

History
- Name: American Promise
- Operator: Dodge Morgan
- Builder: CW Hood Yachts, Marblehead, Massachusetts

General characteristics
- Type: Sloop
- Length: 60 ft (18.3 m)
- Sail plan: Bermuda rigged

American Promise is a yacht used by Dodge Morgan in 1985–1986 for a record-breaking 150-day, 27,000-mile solo circumnavigation of the planet.

== History ==
American Promise is a 60-foot (18.3 m) Bermuda rigged sloop, boat that was designed by 1974 America's Cup winner Ted Hood for Dodge Morgan's solo round-the-world record attempt. The boat was the last to be built by CW Hood Yachts in Marblehead, Massachusetts. The company relocated to Portsmouth, Rhode Island in 1986. Hood recalled it was designed for sturdiness rather than speed: "Everyone said there's no way that boat is going to get around the world in record speed, but it did." It was completed at a cost of $1.5 million.

American Promise departed from Ordnance Island, in St. George's, Bermuda, on November 12, 1985, and returned there on April 11, 1986, completing the journey in 150 days, 1 hour, and 6 minutes. As American Promise sailed into St. George's Harbor, Morgan's project manager, Grant Robinson, noted that the boat looked spit-and-polished. He radioed, "She doesn't look any the worse for wear at all. We see you've still got some paint on her." Morgan replied, "What do you mean 'some paint on her'? She's only been used once."

As Morgan disembarked, his wife, Manny, and his two children handed him a cheeseburger and a bag of popcorn. He told the crowd that had gathered to greet him: "It takes three things to sail around the world alone. A good boat, an iron will and luck. To do so in record time takes a great boat, an iron will and extraordinary luck. And, my friends, here is a great boat."

Morgan was the fourth person and the first American to sail solo around the globe with no stops.

== Legacy ==
Morgan wrote about his voyage in a book titled The Voyage of American Promise, published by Houghton Mifflin in 1989.

Morgan commissioned The New Film Company, Inc. of Boston, Massachusetts, to produce a film about his journey. Producer Christopher G. Knight placed six film cameras on American Promise, three above deck and three below. One in each set was programmed to come on twice a day during daylight hours and run for 30 seconds, thus enabling Morgan to film himself. He used the cameras as a film log and shot over nine hours of film that was ultimately edited into the 57-minute film, Around Alone. This became the first featured film in the PBS series, Adventure. It first aired in March 1987.

Morgan's voyage was also the focus of a series of psychological papers, including an entire issue of the Journal of Personality devoted to analyzing Morgan's life, his experience of the voyage, and the ways in which it may have affected his personality development.
