= 2003 Atlantic hurricane season =

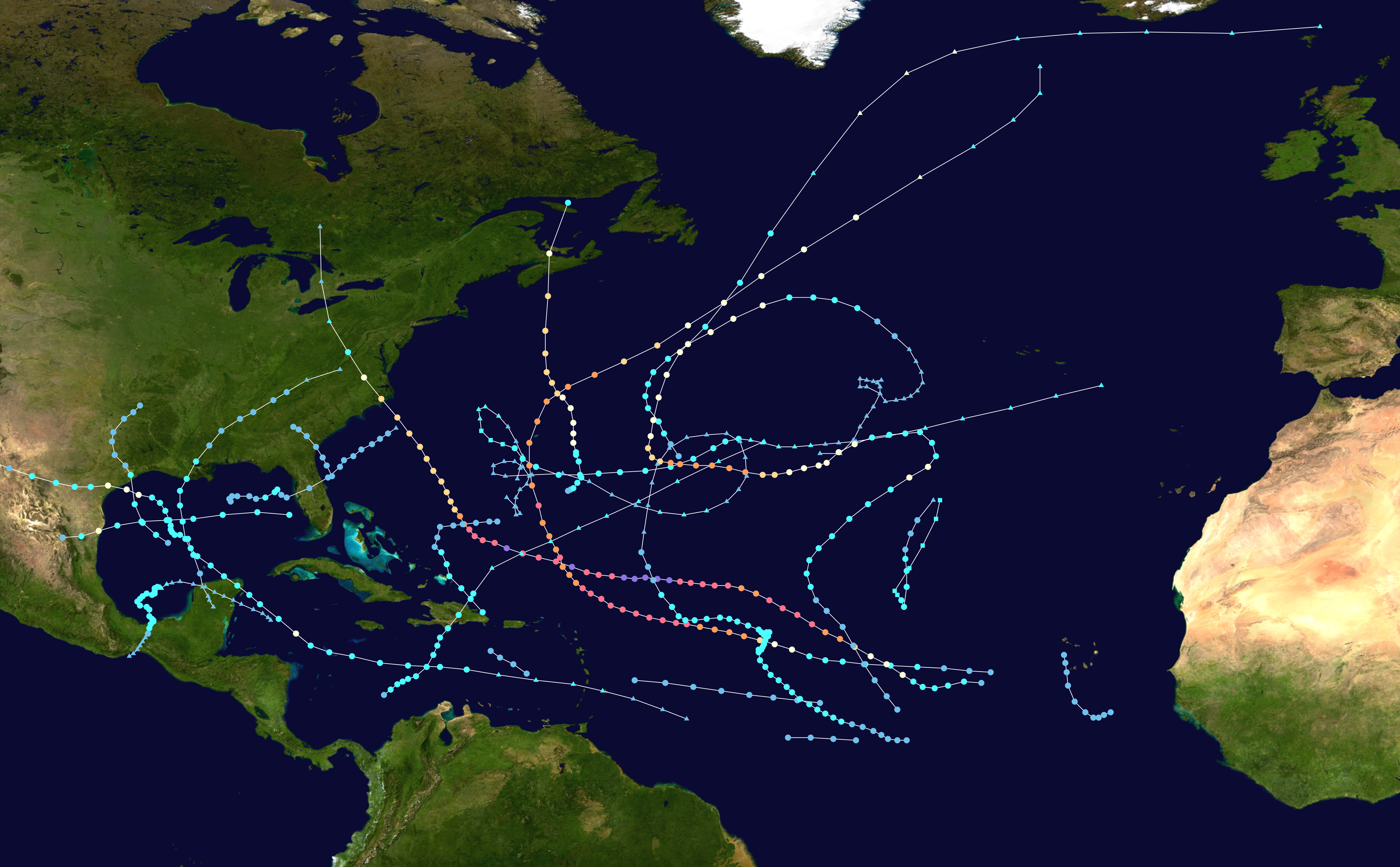
- Season summary map

Seasonal boundaries
- First system formed: April 20, 2003
- Last system dissipated: December 11, 2003

Strongest storm
- Name: Isabel
  - Maximum winds: 165 mph (270 km/h) (1-minute sustained)
  - Lowest pressure: 915 mbar (hPa; 27.02 inHg)

Seasonal statistics
- Total depressions: 21
- Total storms: 16
- Hurricanes: 7
- Major hurricanes (Cat. 3+): 3
- ACE: 176
- Total fatalities: 95 total
- Total damage: $6.262 billion (2003 USD)

Related articles
- Timeline of the 2003 Atlantic hurricane season; 2003 Pacific hurricane season; 2003 Pacific typhoon season; 2003 North Indian Ocean cyclone season

The 2003 Atlantic hurricane season was a very active season with tropical cyclogenesis occurring before and after the official bounds of the season—the first such occurrence since the 1970 season. The season produced 21 tropical cyclones, of which 16 developed into named storms; seven of those attained hurricane status, of which three reached major hurricane status. The strongest hurricane of the season was Hurricane Isabel, which reached Category 5 status on the Saffir–Simpson hurricane scale northeast of the Lesser Antilles; Isabel later struck North Carolina as a Category 2 hurricane, causing $5.5 billion in damage (2003 USD) and a total of 51 deaths across the Mid-Atlantic region of the United States.

Although the bounds of the season are typically from June 1 to November 30, the season began early with the formation of Subtropical Storm Ana on April 20, and it ended relatively late on December 11 with the dissipation of Tropical Storm Peter. In early September, Hurricane Fabian struck Bermuda as a Category 3 hurricane, where it was the worst hurricane since 1926; on the island it caused four deaths and $300 million in damage (2003 USD). Hurricane Juan caused considerable destruction to Nova Scotia, particularly Halifax, as a Category 2 hurricane, the first hurricane of significant strength to hit the province since 1893. Additionally, Hurricanes Claudette and Erika struck Texas and Mexico, respectively, as minimal hurricanes. In December, Tropical Storm Odette struck the Dominican Republic, and Tropical Storm Peter formed in the eastern portion of the basin.

== Seasonal forecasts ==
Predictions of tropical activity in the 2003 season
Source	Date	Named storms	Hurricanes	Major hurricanes
CSU	Average (1950–2000)	9.6	5.9	2.3
NOAA	Average	11	6	2
NOAA	May 19, 2003	11–15	6–9	2–4
CSU	April 4, 2003	12	8	3
CSU	May 30, 2003	14	8	3
CSU	August 6, 2003	14	8	3
Actual activity		16	7	3

=== Pre-season outlook ===
On May 19, prior to the start of the season, NOAA forecasters issued a 55% probability of above normal activity. The forecasters predicted 11–15 tropical storms, 6–9 of those becoming hurricanes, and 2–4 of those hurricanes reaching at least Category 3 strength on the Saffir–Simpson hurricane scale. The above normal activity predicted was due to the likelihood of La Niña developing in the season.

Noted hurricane expert Dr. William M. Gray on April 4 predicted twelve named storms, with eight reaching hurricane strength and three of the eight reaching Category 3 strength. The prediction issued on May 30 was similar, increasing the named storms to fourteen. The synoptic pattern of the season prior to June 1 resembled other previous seasons, with the 1952, 1954, 1964, 1966, and 1998 seasons considered the best analogs for the season. The prediction also included a 68% probability for a hurricane landfall along the United States.

=== Mid-season outlook ===
On August 6, Dr. Gray announced he had maintained his previous prediction; with an active start of the season, the rest of the season was forecast to have been only slightly above average, due to an anticipated overall less favorable environment across the Atlantic Ocean. A day later, NOAA released an updated prediction as well, with a 60% probability of above normal activity, with 12–15 named storms, 7–9 hurricanes, and 3–4 major hurricanes expected.

A normal season, as defined by NOAA, has 6–14 tropical storms, 4–8 of which reach hurricane strength, and 1–3 of those reaching Category 3 strength.

== Seasonal summary ==
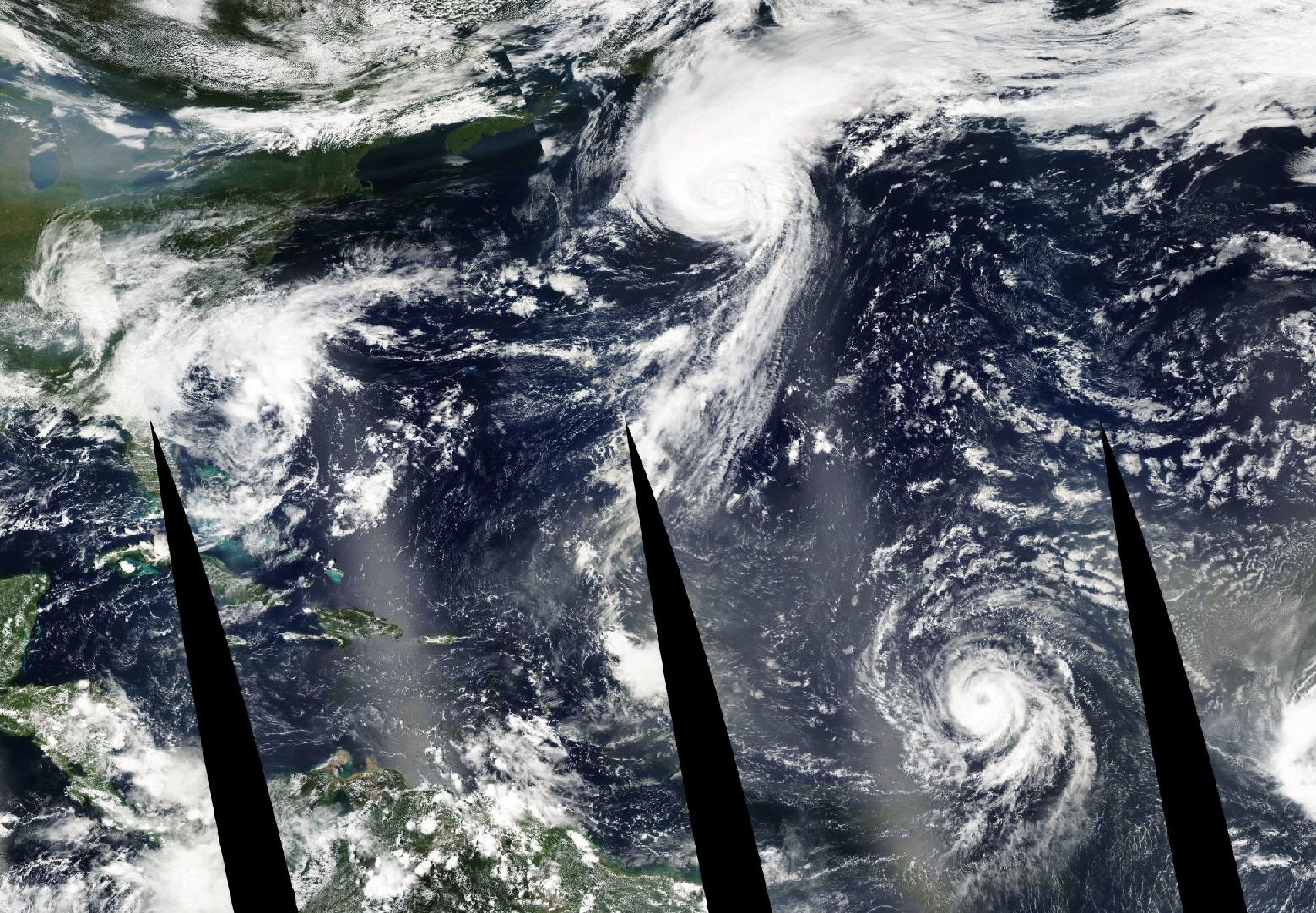
Three simultaneous tropical cyclones on September 7, Henri (left), Fabian (center) and Isabel (right).

The official beginning of the season was on June 1, 2003, though Subtropical Storm Ana formed on April 20, well before the start to the season. Starting at the official start of the season, the National Hurricane Center (NHC) began issuing five-day forecasts, extending from the three-day forecasts issued since 1964. Officials conducted tests during the previous two seasons, indicating the new five-day forecasts would be as accurate as the three-day forecasts were 15 years earlier. The tropics were active and well ahead of climatology in the early portion of the season, with the seventh tropical depression forming by the end of July. The season officially ended on November 30, 2003, although tropical storms Odette and Peter developed in early December. The season was one of only six with a storm before and after the official bounds of the season; the others are 1887, 1951, 1953, 1954, 1970 and 2007. When Tropical Storm Peter formed on December 7, the season became the second on record with two December storms. The 235 days between the development of the first storm, Tropical Storm Ana, and the dissipation of the last storm, Peter, made the 2003 season the longest season since 1952.

Overall, the season's activity was reflected with a high cumulative accumulated cyclone energy (ACE) rating of 176. ACE is, broadly speaking, a measure of the power of the hurricane multiplied by the length of time it existed, so storms that last a long time, as well as particularly strong hurricanes, like Fabian and Isabel, have high ACEs. ACE is only calculated for full advisories on tropical systems at or exceeding 34 knots (39 mph (63 km/h) or tropical storm strength. Subtropical cyclones are excluded from the total.

A total of eight tropical cyclones made landfall on Mexico from either the Atlantic or the Pacific Ocean, which was the greatest total since the record of nine in 1971. Seven deaths occurred in Mexico from Atlantic hurricanes. Six tropical cyclones made landfall along the coast of the United States during the season, including two hurricanes. The first, Claudette, struck southeastern Texas in July. In September, Hurricane Isabel hit North Carolina, resulting in 52 fatalities and damage totaling $3.6 billion (2003 USD). It was the costliest disaster in the history of Virginia. Several cyclones impacted Bermuda during the season, most significantly Hurricane Fabian. It was the island's costliest hurricane on record, with a damage total of$300 million. Fabian was also the island's first deadly hurricane since 1926, when it washed away two cars on the causeway between St. George's Parish and St. David's Island. Also in September, Hurricane Juan hit Nova Scotia, becoming the most damaging storm in the history of Halifax, while also causing eight fatalities.

== Systems ==
=== Tropical Storm Ana ===
- Tropical storm (SSHWS)
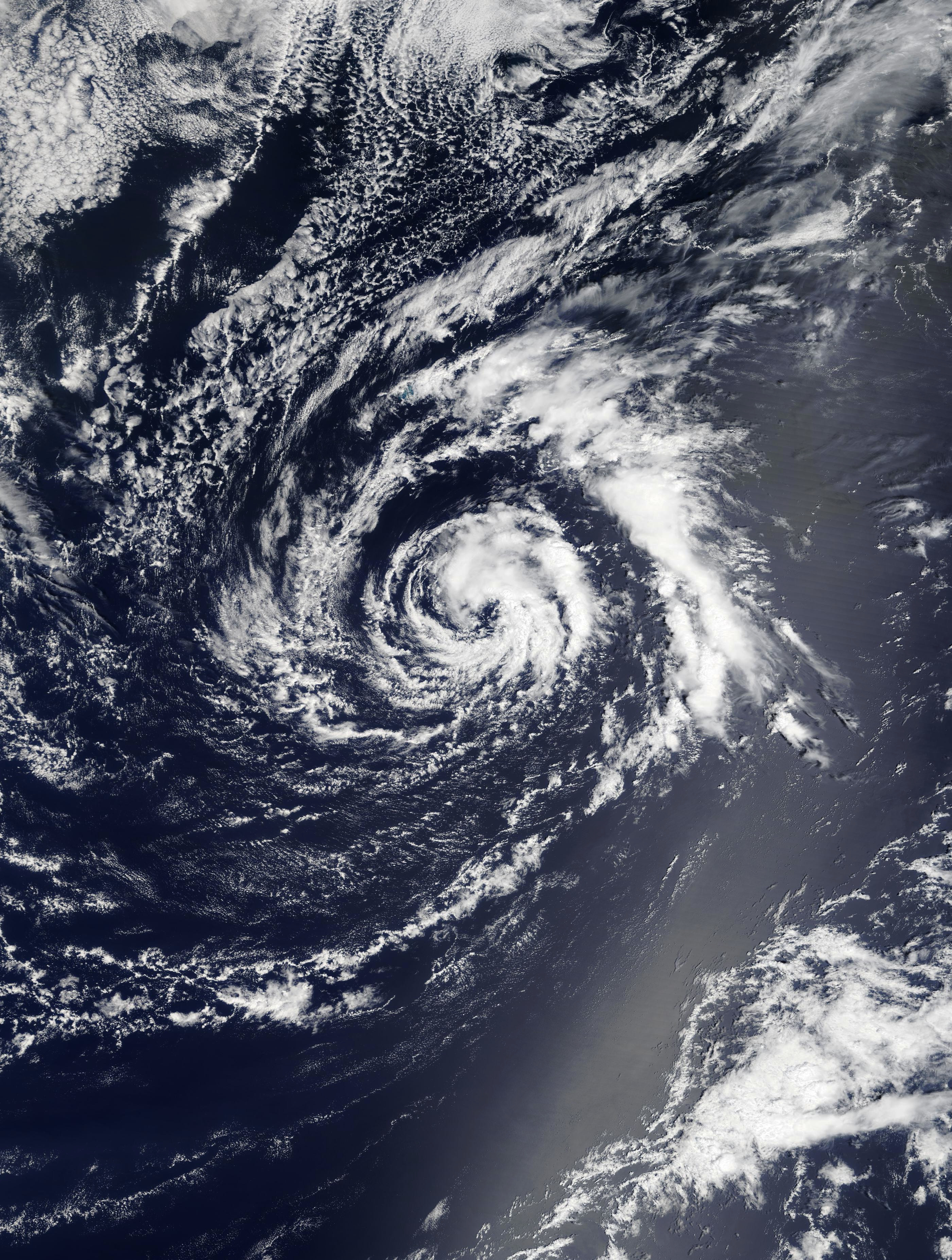
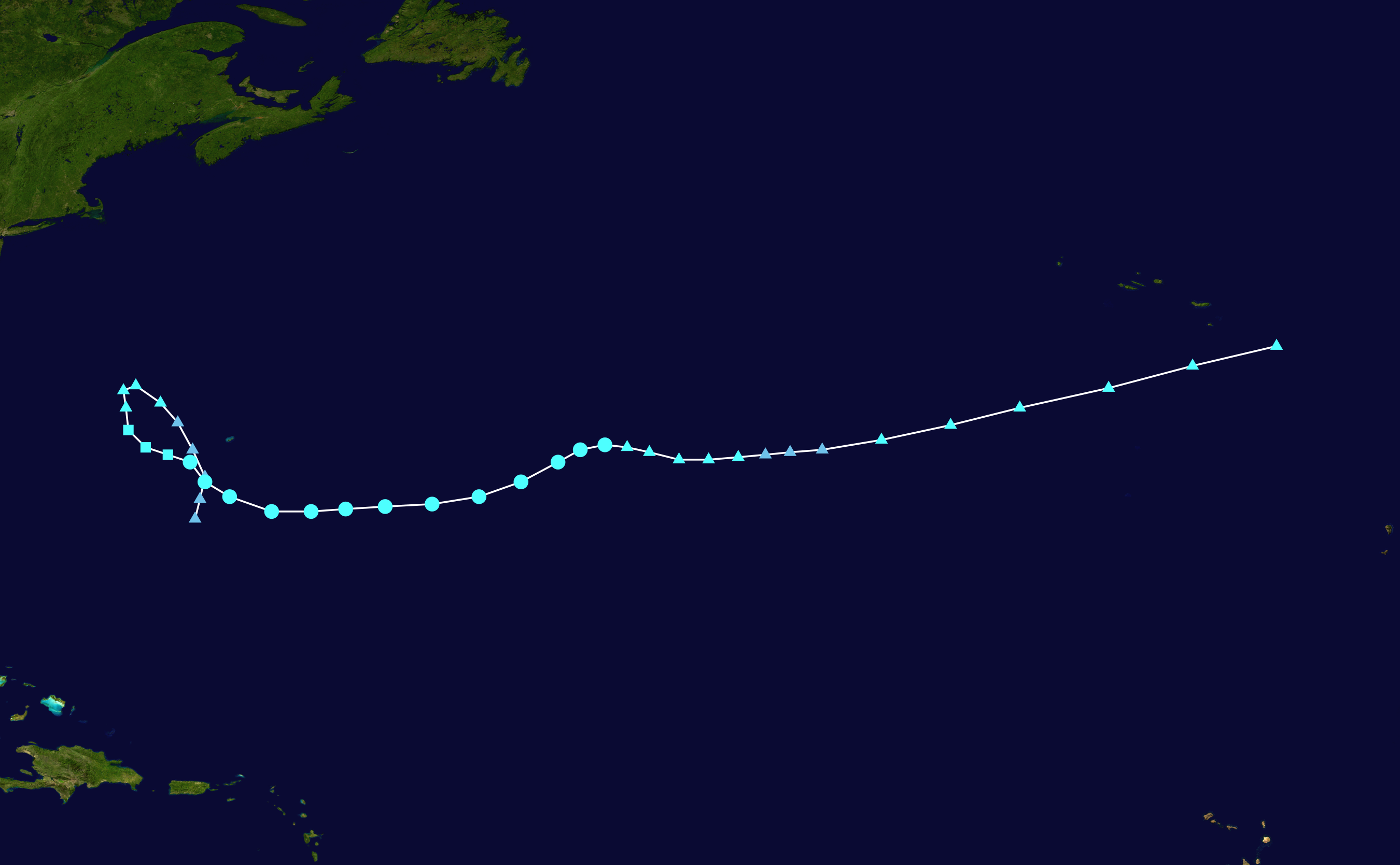
- Duration: April 20 – April 24
- Peak intensity: 60 mph (95 km/h) (1-min); 994 mbar (hPa)

The origins of Ana were from a non-tropical low pressure area that formed about 240 miles (390 km) south-southwest of Bermuda on April 18, from the interaction of an upper-level trough and a surface front. The trough drew moisture from the Caribbean Sea, which caused heavy rainfall in Puerto Rico. On April 19, the non-tropical low began producing sporadic convection, or thunderstorms, as a small inner core formed. The system executed a loop and gradually became dissociated from the front. Early on April 20, the system developed into Subtropical Storm Ana while located about 250 miles (400 km) west of Bermuda. Ana was the earliest subtropical or tropical storm to form in an Atlantic hurricane season since 1978. By the time of its formation, Ana was moving generally eastward while continuing to organize and become more tropical. At 00:00 UTC on April 21, the NHC estimated that Ana transitioned into a tropical storm, with peak winds of 60 mph (95 km/h). This was based on estimates from the Hebert-Poteat technique and data from QuikSCAT. This made Ana the first recorded Atlantic tropical storm in April. Shortly thereafter, it made its closest point of approach to Bermuda, when it passed about 130 miles (210 km) southwest of the island. The storm developed an eye feature, despite the presence of strong wind shear, although the thunderstorms diminished on April 22, and a day later the circulation lost organization. On April 24, Ana merged with an approaching cold front and became an extratropical cyclone. The extratropical storm accelerated east-northeastward before losing its identity within the frontal zone on April 27 southeast of the Azores.

Bermuda issued gale warnings, and later a tropical storm warning. The storm dropped 2.63 inches (67 mm) of precipitation in a six-day period at the Bermuda International Airport. Swells from the storm impacted the coast of Florida. The combination of the swells and an outgoing tide caused a boat to capsize in Jupiter Inlet on April 20; two of its occupants drowned, and the other two were rescued. As an extratropical storm, the remnants of Ana dropped 0.87 inches (22 mm) of precipitation in the city of Ponta Delgada in the Azores. Moisture from the remnants of Ana also produced beneficial rainfall in the United Kingdom.

=== Tropical Depression Two ===
- Tropical depression (SSHWS)
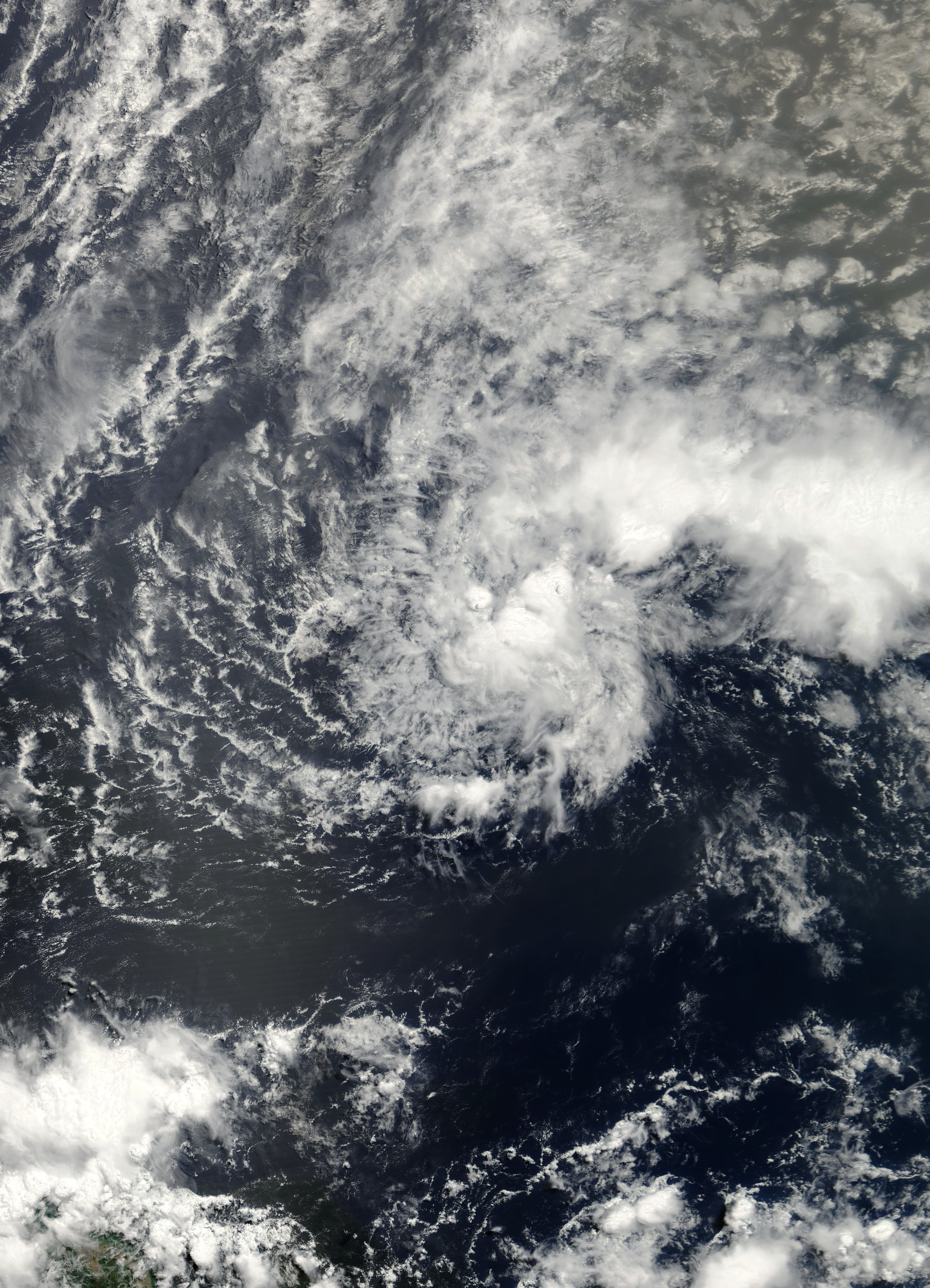
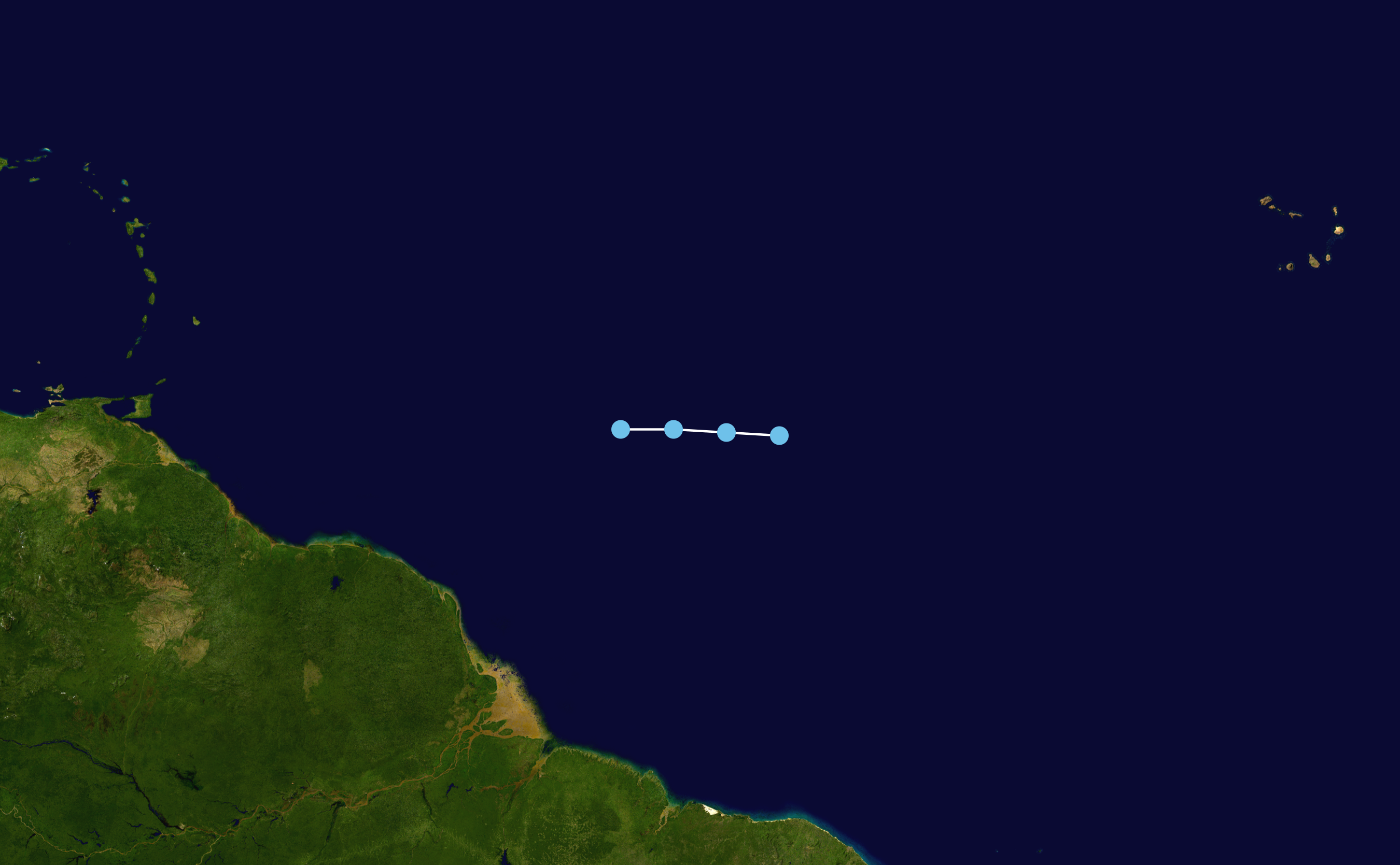
- Duration: June 11 – June 11
- Peak intensity: 35 mph (55 km/h) (1-min); 1008 mbar (hPa)

A tropical wave moved off the west coast of Africa on June 6. Tracking westward at a low latitude, it encountered favorable environmental conditions, leading to an increase in convection. Early on June 11, it developed into Tropical Depression Two about 830 mi (1,335 km) east-northeast of French Guiana. Its June formation east of the Lesser Antilles was rare. The depression initially had outflow and rainbands. However, the convection quickly diminished and became displaced to the northeast of the center. Late on June 11, the depression degenerated into an open tropical wave about 950 mi (1,530 km) east-southeast of Barbados. Strong wind shear prevented redevelopment, and the remnants later passed through the Windward Islands on June 13.

=== Tropical Storm Bill ===
- Tropical storm (SSHWS)
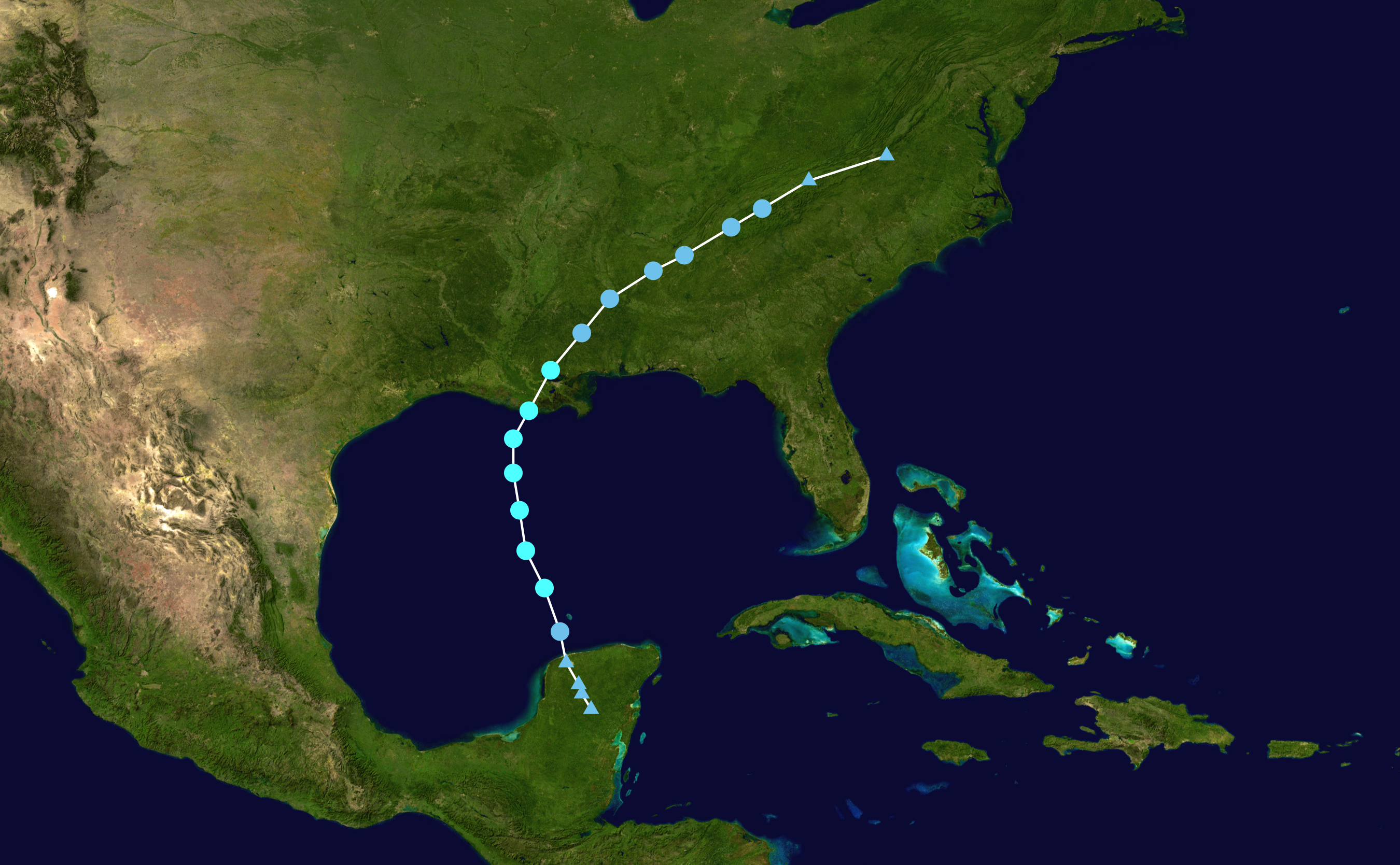
- Duration: June 29 – July 2
- Peak intensity: 60 mph (95 km/h) (1-min); 997 mbar (hPa)

Tropical Storm Bill developed from a tropical wave on June 29 to the north of the Yucatán Peninsula. It slowly organized as it moved northward, and reached a peak of 60 mph (97 km/h) shortly before making landfall 20 mi (30 km) west of Cocodrie, Louisiana. Bill quickly weakened over land, and as it accelerated to the northeast, moisture from the storm, combined with cold air from an approaching cold front, produced an outbreak of 34 tornadoes. Bill became extratropical on July 2, and was absorbed by the cold front later that day.

Upon making landfall on Louisiana, the storm produced a moderate storm surge, causing tidal flooding. In a city in the northeastern portion of the state, the surge breached a levee, which flooded many homes in the town. Moderate winds combined with wet soil knocked down trees, which then hit a few houses and power lines, and left hundreds of thousands without electric power. Further inland, tornadoes from the storm produced localized moderate damage. Throughout its path, Tropical Storm Bill caused around $50 million in damage (2003 USD) and four deaths.

=== Hurricane Claudette ===
- Category 1 hurricane (SSHWS)
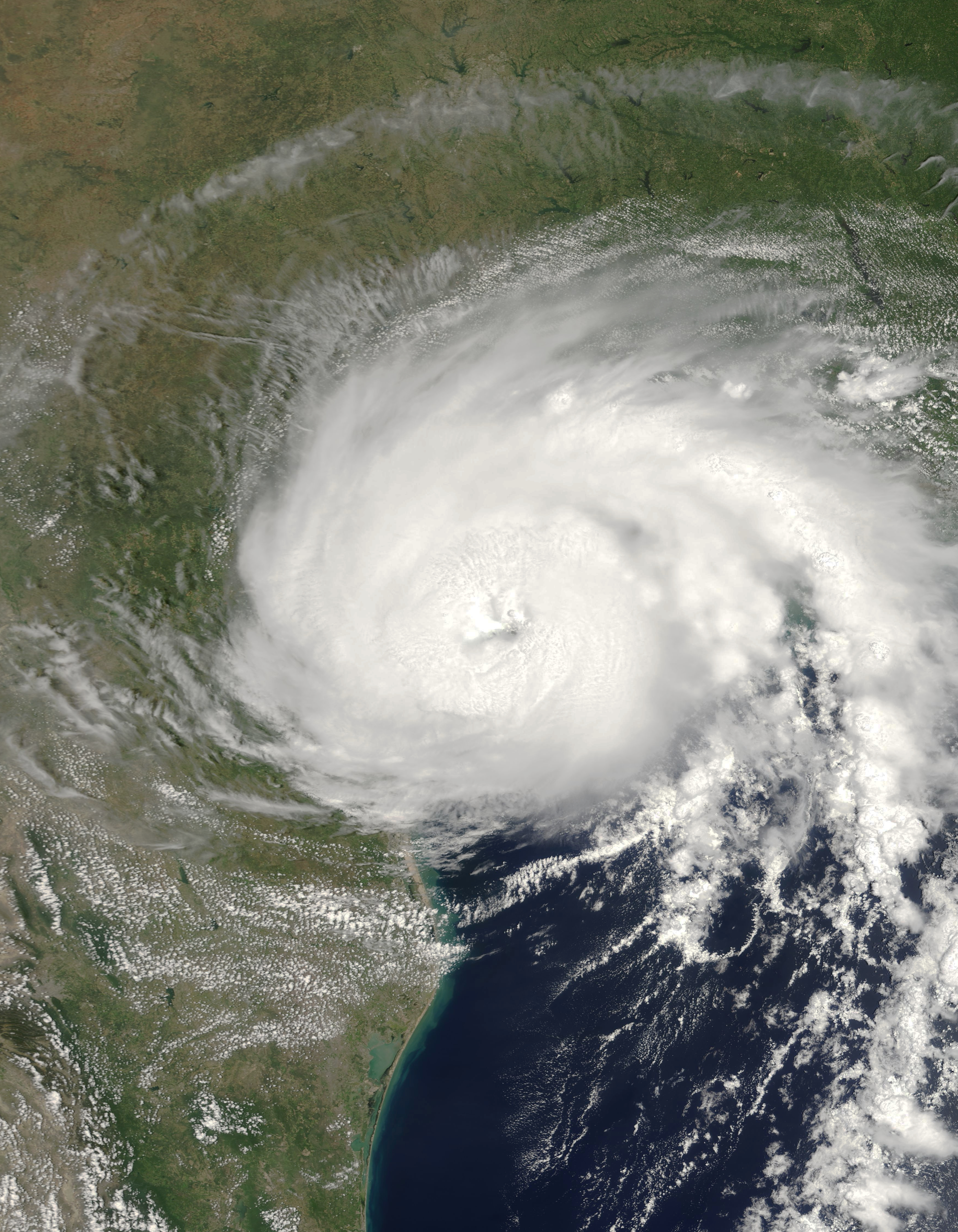
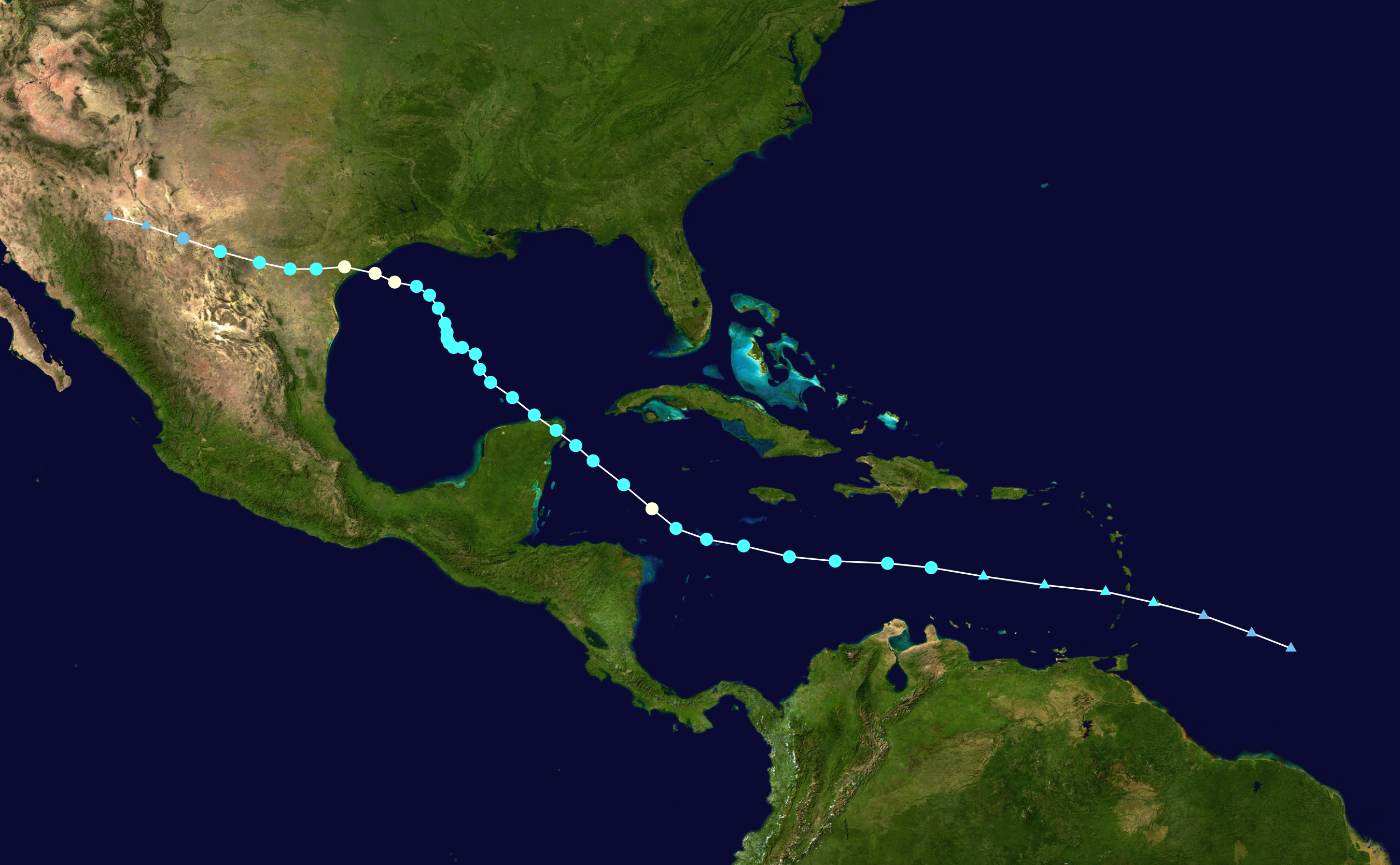
- Duration: July 8 – July 17
- Peak intensity: 90 mph (150 km/h) (1-min); 979 mbar (hPa)

A well-organized tropical wave tracked quickly through the Lesser Antilles on July 7, producing tropical storm force winds but failing to attain a low-level circulation. After organizing in the Caribbean, it developed into Tropical Storm Claudette to the south of the Dominican Republic on July 8. Its intensity fluctuated over the subsequent days, attaining hurricane status briefly on July 10 before weakening and hitting Puerto Morelos on the Yucatán Peninsula on July 11 as a tropical storm. The storm remained disorganized due to moderate wind shear, though after turning west-northwestward into an area of lighter shear, it re-attained hurricane status on July 15 off the coast of Texas; it intensified quickly and made landfall on Matagorda Island with peak winds of 90 mph (140 km/h). It slowly weakened after moving ashore, tracking across northern Tamaulipas before dissipating in northwestern Chihuahua.

The precursor cyclone caused light damage in the Lesser Antilles, and waves from the hurricane caused an indirect death off of Florida. Widespread flooding and gusty winds destroyed or severely damaged 412 buildings in southeast Texas, with a further 1,346 buildings suffering lighter impact. The hurricane caused locally severe beach erosion along the coast. High winds downed many trees along the coast, causing one direct and one indirect death. Damage was estimated at $180 million (2003 USD).

=== Hurricane Danny ===
- Category 1 hurricane (SSHWS)
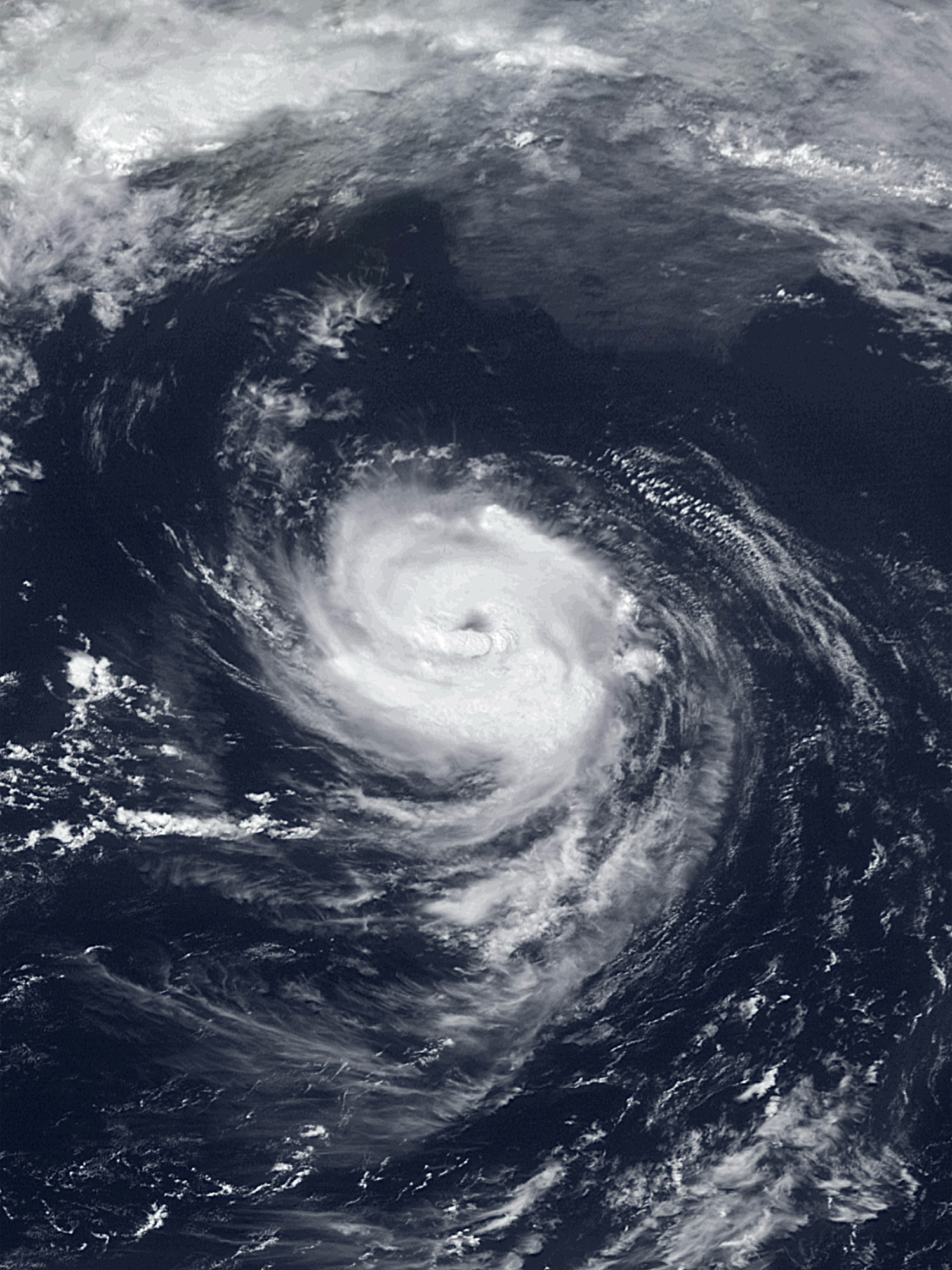
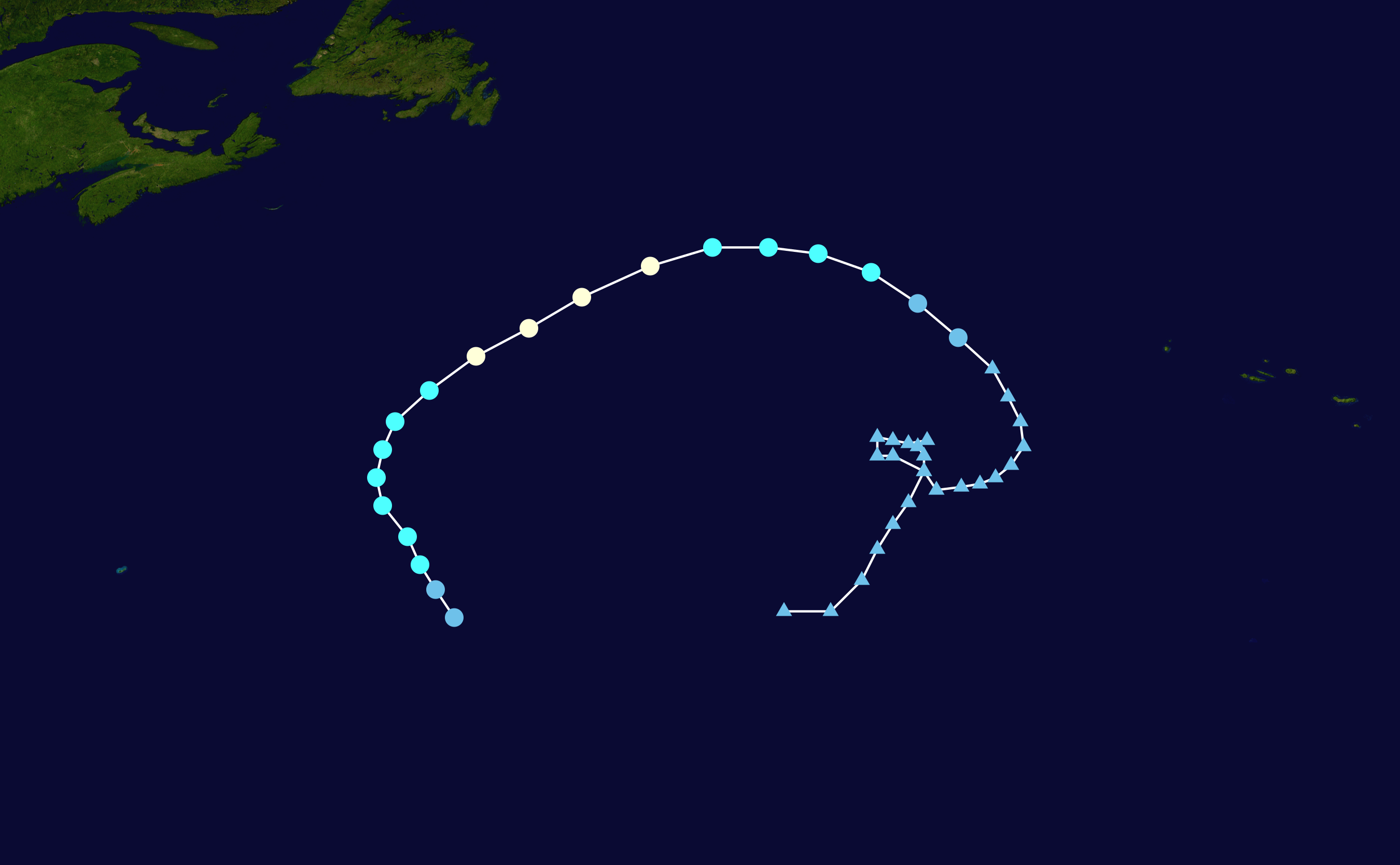
- Duration: July 16 – July 21
- Peak intensity: 75 mph (120 km/h) (1-min); 1000 mbar (hPa)

A large and well-organized tropical wave moved off the coast of Africa on July 9. Cooler waters limited convection as the wave moved northwestward, but thunderstorms increased again on July 13. The system developed into a tropical depression on July 16 about 630 miles (1,015 km) east of Bermuda. The convection organized further, developing banding features, and the depression strengthened into Tropical Storm Danny early on July 17. The storm moved around the western periphery of the subtropical ridge, curving to the northeast over warmer than usual water temperatures for the latitude. After developing a 17 mile (27 km) wide eye, Danny attained hurricane status late on July 18, while located approximately 525 miles (850 km) south of St. John's, Newfoundland and Labrador. The hurricane was embedded within a higher than average surrounding pressure field; as a result, the minimum central pressure was an unusually high 1000 mbar. Danny maintained hurricane status for about 24 hours, until being affected by cooler waters and stronger wind shear. Late on July 19, it weakened into a tropical storm, and fell to tropical depression status the next day. Danny continued around the northern periphery of the ridge, turning to the east and southeast. On July 21, Danny degenerated into a remnant area of low pressure. The low turned southward and southwestward into an area of warmer water temperatures. After executing a small cyclonic loop on July 24, Danny developed deep convection over the center. However, a large area of dry air prevented re-development of the storm. On July 27, the remnant low dissipated about 1,240 miles (2,000 km) east of Bermuda, or about 630 miles (1,015 km) east of where tropical cyclogenesis originally took place.

=== Tropical Depression Six ===
- Tropical depression (SSHWS)
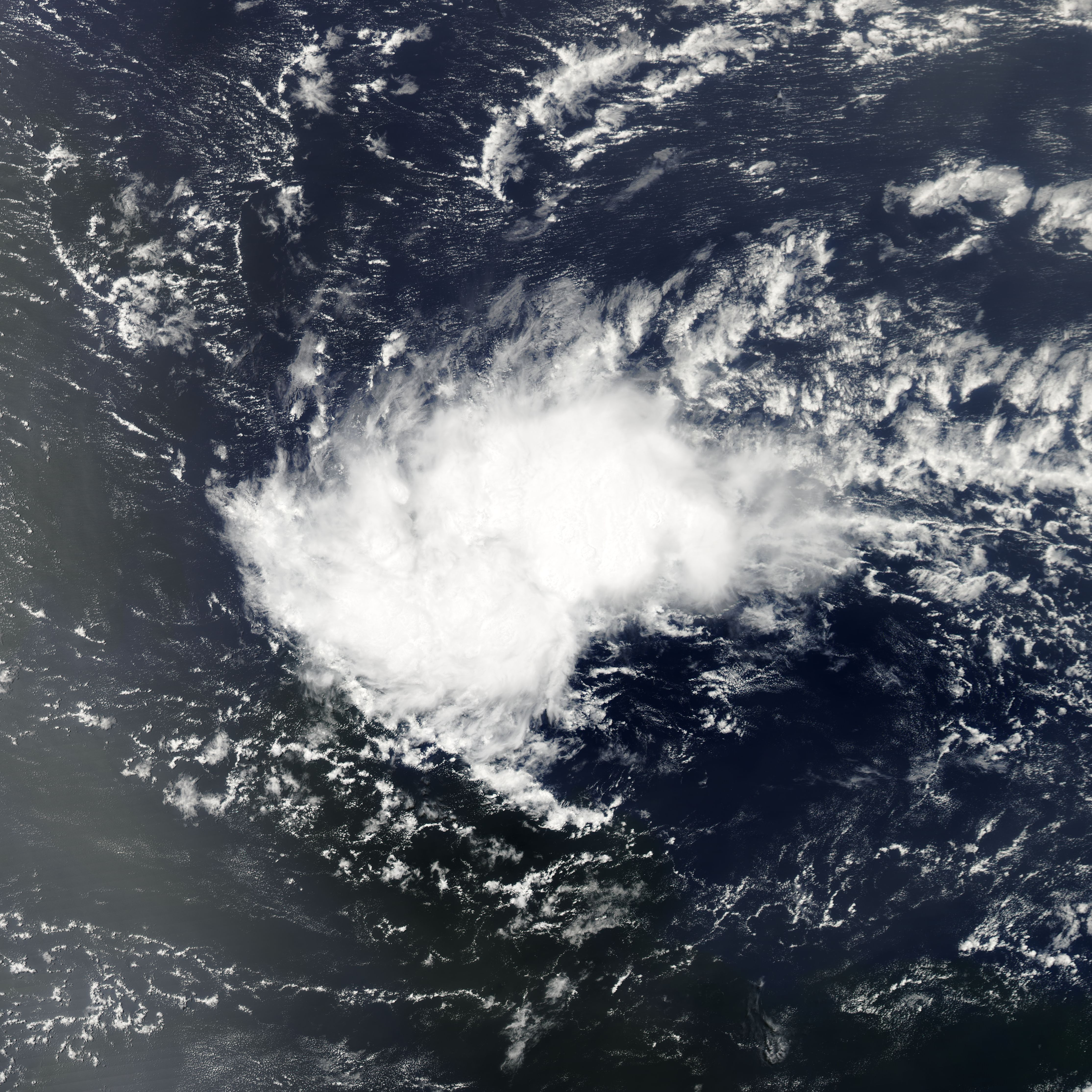
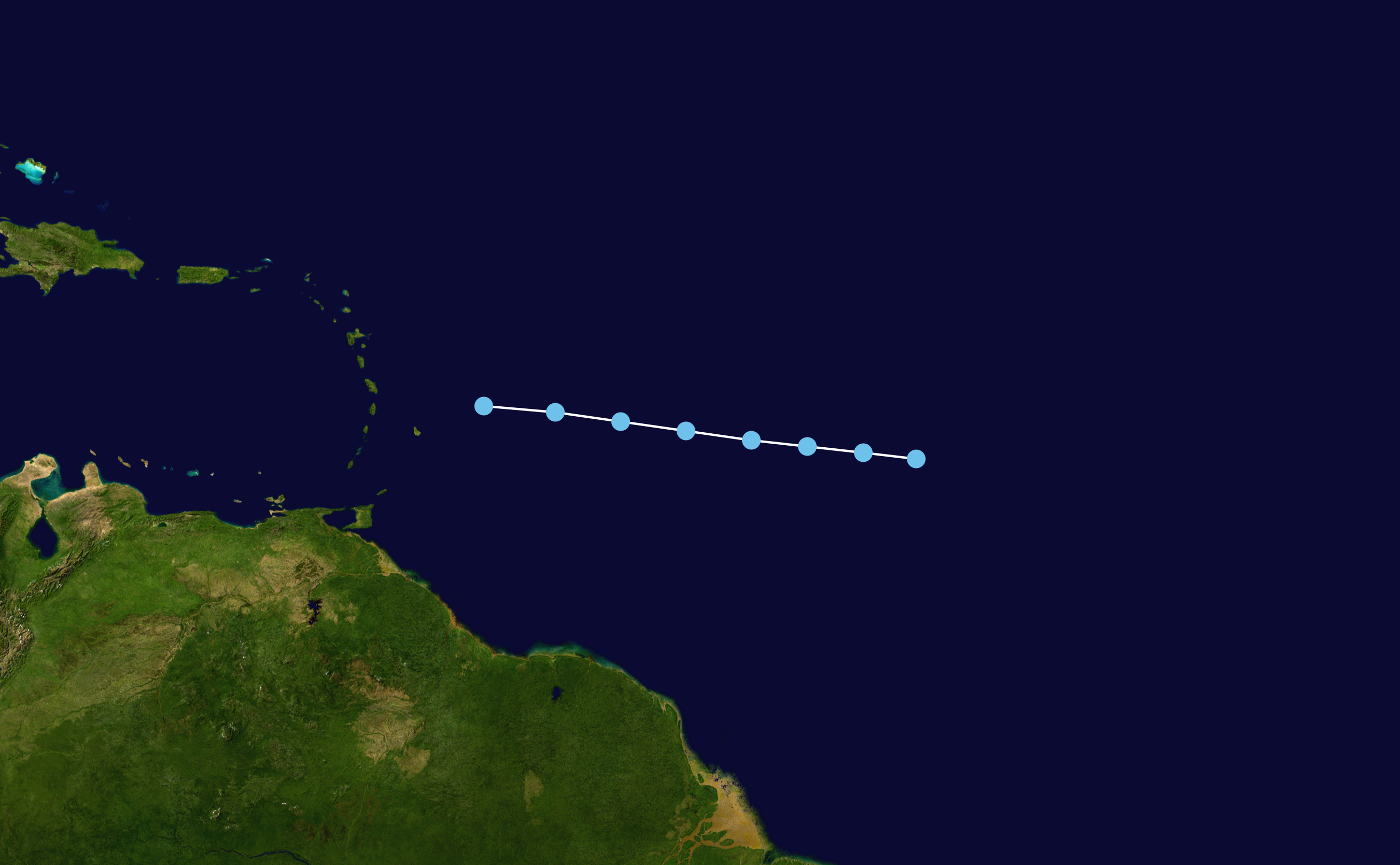
- Duration: July 19 – July 21
- Peak intensity: 35 mph (55 km/h) (1-min); 1010 mbar (hPa)

A tropical wave moved westward off the coast of Africa on July 14. A area of thunderstorms became more concentrated amid favorable conditions. Late on July 19, the NHC classified it as Tropical Depression Six about 1,035 mi (1,665 km) east of the Lesser Antilles. The depression was originally forecast to attain hurricane status before passing through the Lesser Antilles. Several islands in the Lesser Antilles issued tropical storm warnings and watches. However, convection diminished as the result of cold air inflow and instability from a disturbance to its southeast. The depression degenerated into a tropical wave late on July 21. The remnants brought a few showers to the Lesser Antilles. The northern portion of the wave axis split and developed into Tropical Depression Seven.

=== Tropical Depression Seven ===
- Tropical depression (SSHWS)
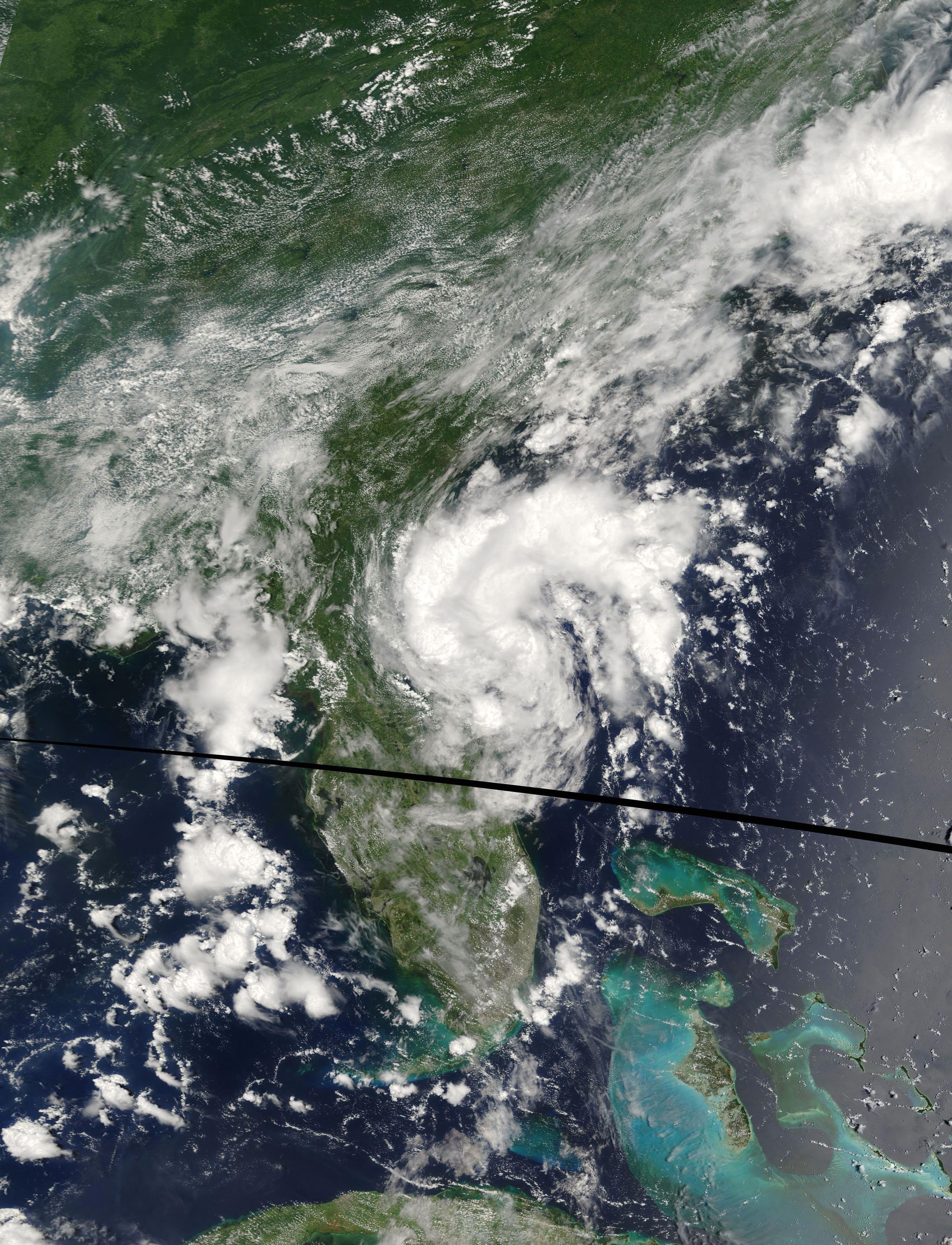
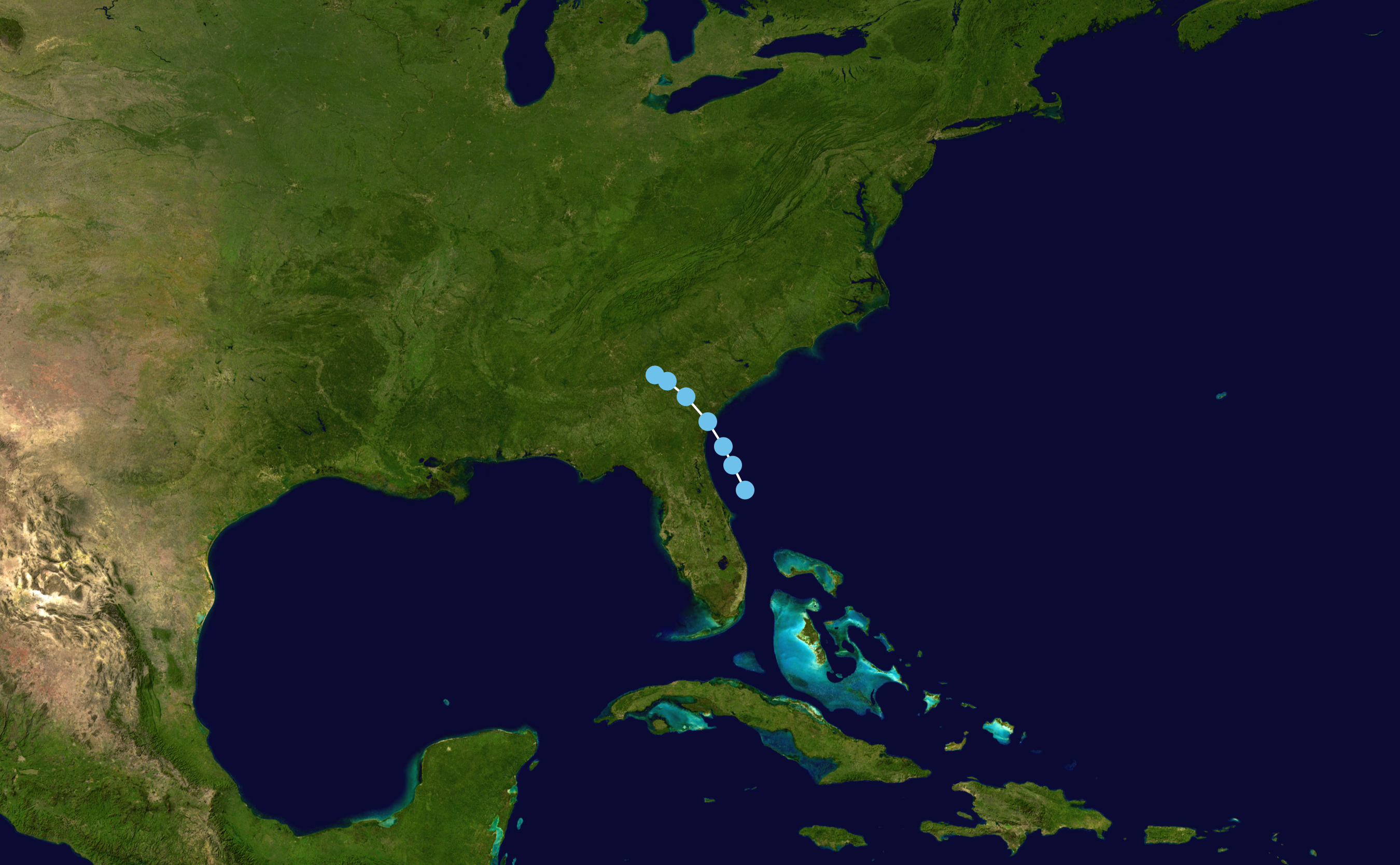
- Duration: July 25 – July 27
- Peak intensity: 35 mph (55 km/h) (1-min); 1016 mbar (hPa)

A tropical wave interacted with an upper-level low to develop an area of deep convection near Hispaniola on July 23. A mid- to lower-level circulation developed within the system at it tracked generally north-northwestward, and based on surface and satellite observations, it is estimated the system developed into Tropical Depression Seven at 1200 UTC on July 25 about 60 mi (95 km) east of Daytona Beach, Florida. The system was embedded in an environment characterized by high surface pressures. Tracking through an area of cool water temperatures, as well as unfavorable upper-level winds, the depression failed to achieve winds greater than 35 mph (56 km/h). Early on July 26 it moved ashore on St. Catherines Island, Georgia, and after steadily weakening over land it dissipated on July 27. Flood watches were posted for much of Georgia and South Carolina. The depression dropped light to moderate rainfall from Florida to the coast of North Carolina, peaking at 5.17 in (131 mm) in Savannah, Georgia.

=== Hurricane Erika ===
- Category 1 hurricane (SSHWS)
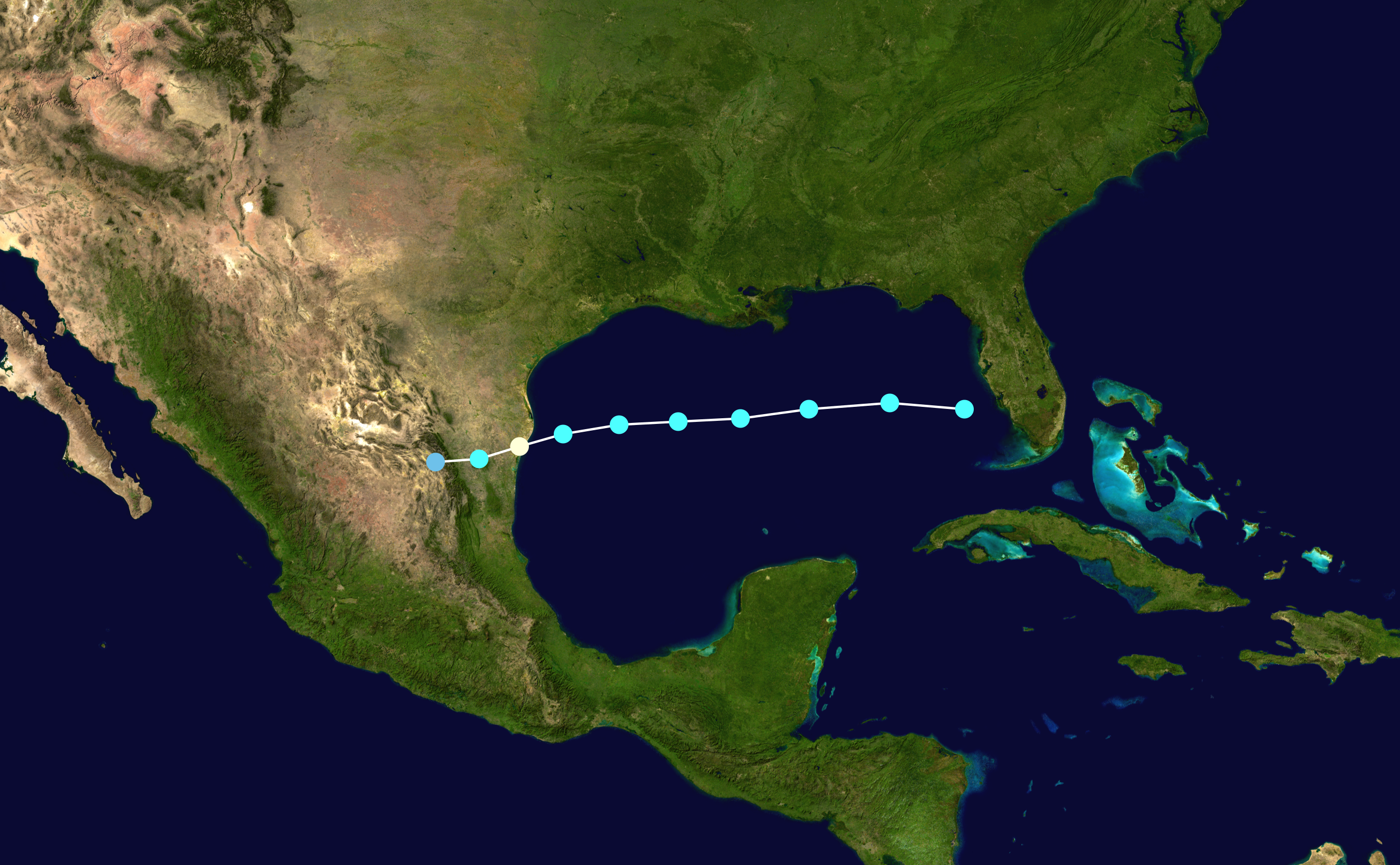
- Duration: August 14 – August 17
- Peak intensity: 75 mph (120 km/h) (1-min); 986 mbar (hPa)

On August 8, a low detached from a frontal system well to the east of Bermuda, and began generating convection after passing beneath a cold-core low the next day. The system moved rapidly westward, reaching the northwestern Bahamas on August 13, and southern Florida the next day. Late on August 14, Tropical Storm Erika formed in the eastern Gulf of Mexico after developing a surface circulation. The storm strengthened in an environment of low wind shear, with well-established outflow and rainbands. Erika turned to the west-southwest early on August 16 as it approached the western gulf, and an eye became evident on radar. At 10:30 UTC that day, Erika attained hurricane status while moving ashore near Boca San Rafael, Tamaulipas, with peak winds of 75 mph (120 km/h), with a minimum pressure of 986 mbar (29.1 inHg). The NHC originally classified it as a tropical storm, but later reclassified Erika based on Doppler-wind estimates. Erika rapidly weakened over the mountainous Sierra Madre Oriental, and its low-level circulation dissipated early on August 17. The mid-level circulation crossed Mexico and produced another tropical disturbance in the Gulf of California, which dissipated by August 20.

The precursor disturbance dropped heavy precipitation while moving across Florida, and also produced 6–8 ft (1.8–2.4 m) waves. The threat of Erika led to the evacuation of 51 oil platforms and 3 oil rigs in the western Gulf of Mexico. Hurricane warnings were issued from La Pesca, Tamaulipas, to Baffin Bay, Texas. About 10,000 were evacuated in northeastern Mexico. Rainfall in Mexico peaked at 6.71 in (170 mm) in Magueyes, Tamaulipas. There were 30 injuries and two deaths in Nuevo León. In Montemorelos, two people died while driving across a partially flooded bridge. The heavy rainfall resulted in severe flooding and mudslides, blocking several highways in northeastern Mexico. Wind gusts peaked at 65 mph (105 km/h) in San Fernando, Tamaulipas. The winds snapped tree branches and spread debris across roads. Throughout Mexico, 20,000 people lost power due to the storm. In south Texas, Erika's rainfall reached 3.83 inches (97 mm) in Sabinal. Wind gusts reached 60 mph (97 km/h) on South Padre Island, damaging the roof of a business. The winds damaged several trees in Brownsville, and damage in the area totaled $10,000. The storm caused minor flooding and beach erosion along South Padre Island, with strong waves reaching as far north as Corpus Christi.

=== Tropical Depression Nine ===
- Tropical depression (SSHWS)
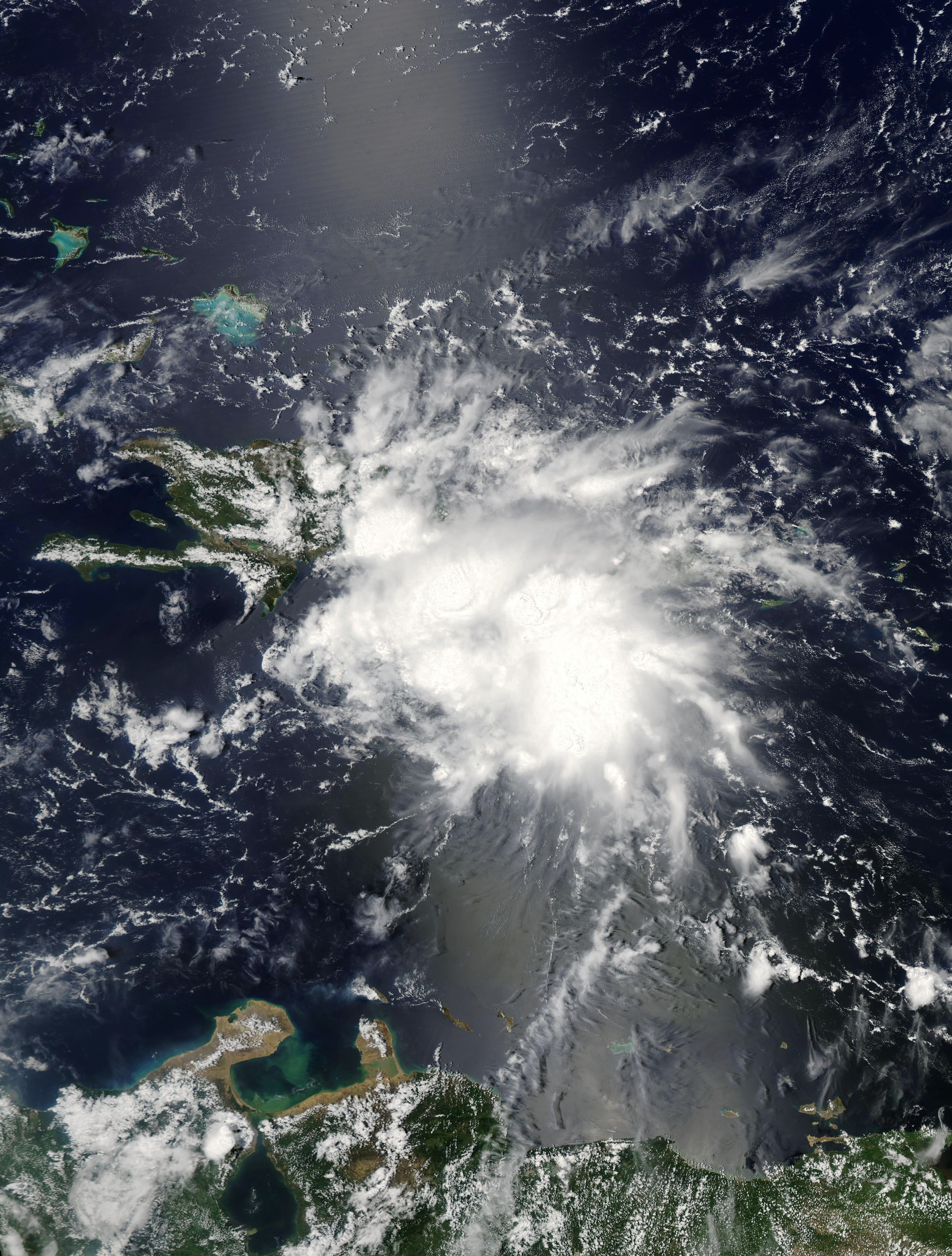
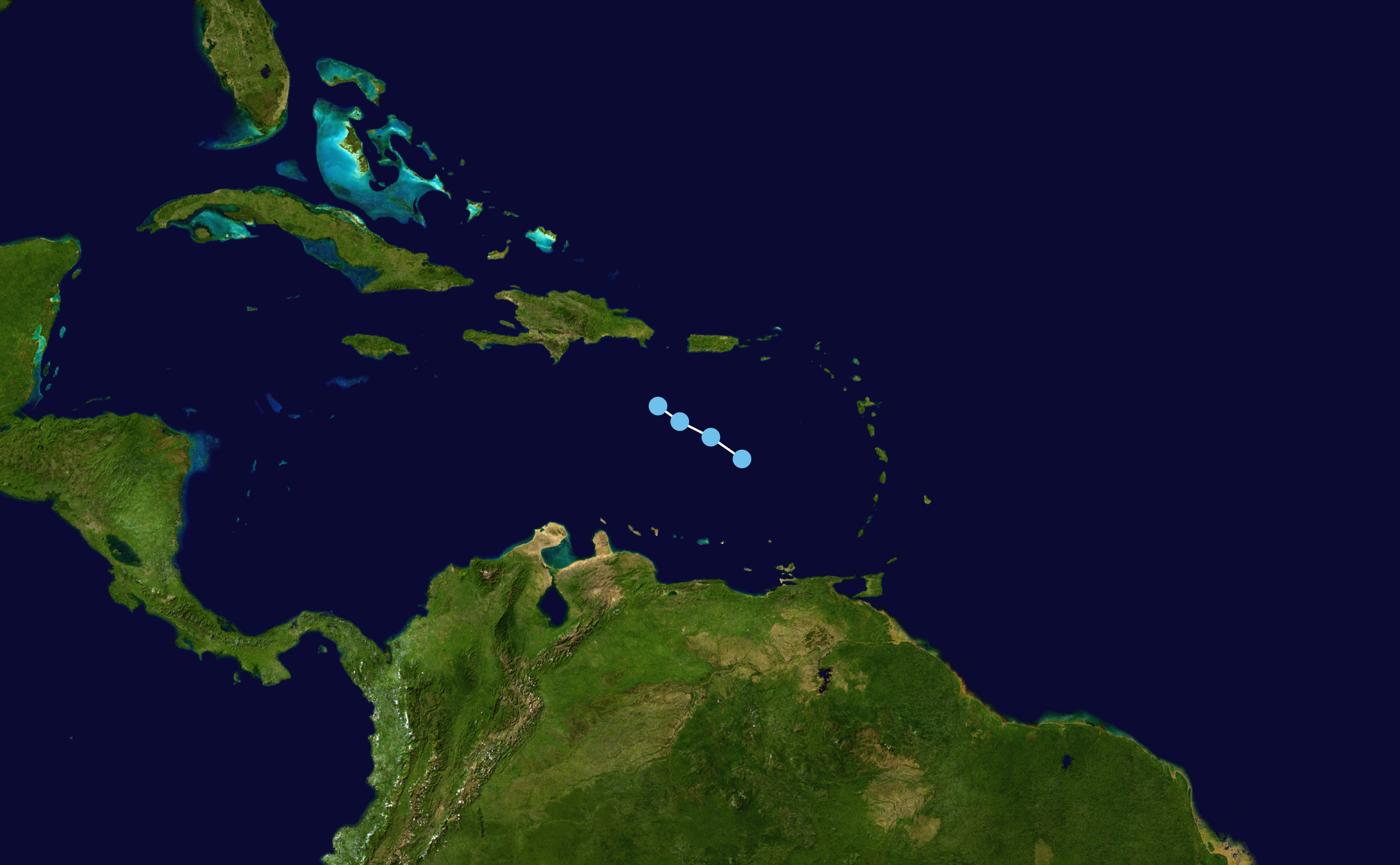
- Duration: August 21 – August 22
- Peak intensity: 35 mph (55 km/h) (1-min); 1007 mbar (hPa)

A strong tropical wave exited the coast of Africa on August 14, and proceeded westward. On August 17, a weak area of low pressure developed, and the thunderstorms increased on the next day. On August 19, the system moved through the Lesser Antilles, and it became more organized over the eastern Caribbean. Ship reports indicated that the system developed into Tropical Depression Nine on August 21, about 260 miles (415 km) south of San Juan, Puerto Rico. Upper-level outflow remained well-defined, though convection waned near the center early on August 22. Strong southwesterly wind shear caused the depression to degenerate into a tropical wave late on August 22, south of the eastern tip of the Dominican Republic. The wave axis moved over the Dominican Republic on August 23.

The depression dropped 2 to 3 in (51 to 76 mm) of precipitation on Puerto Rico, leading to floodwaters that entered 10 houses and prohibited passage of some streets. Additionally, a mudslide occurred at Caguas, while a river overflowed in Río Grande but returned to normal levels within hours. Damage in Puerto Rico totaled $20,000. The remnants of the depression dropped light to moderate precipitation in the Dominican Republic, which caused flooding and overflowing rivers that damaged more than 100 homes and some crops. However, the rainfall was otherwise beneficial due to dry conditions in the preceding months. Flooding was also reported in eastern Jamaica.

=== Hurricane Fabian ===
- Category 4 hurricane (SSHWS)
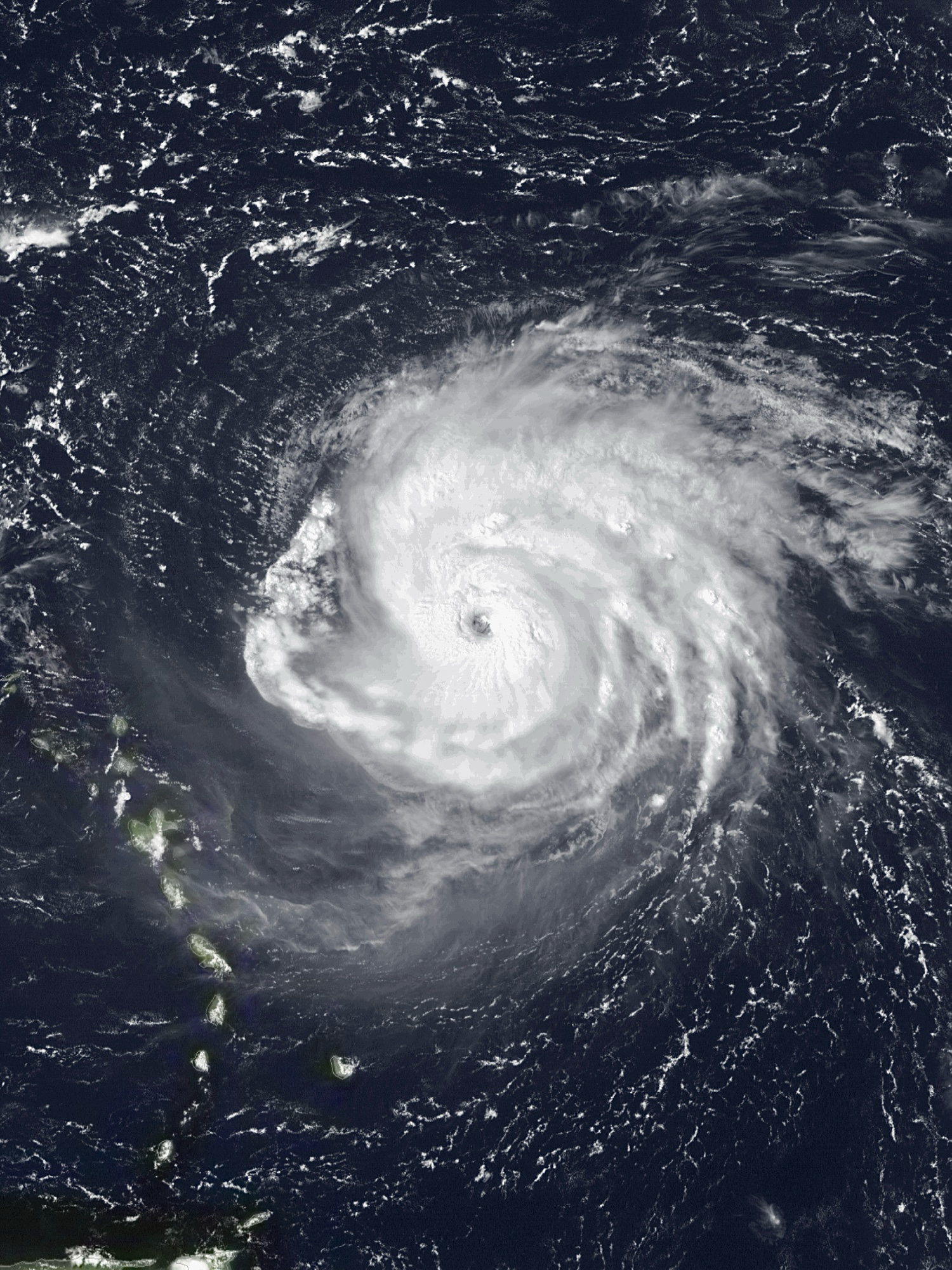
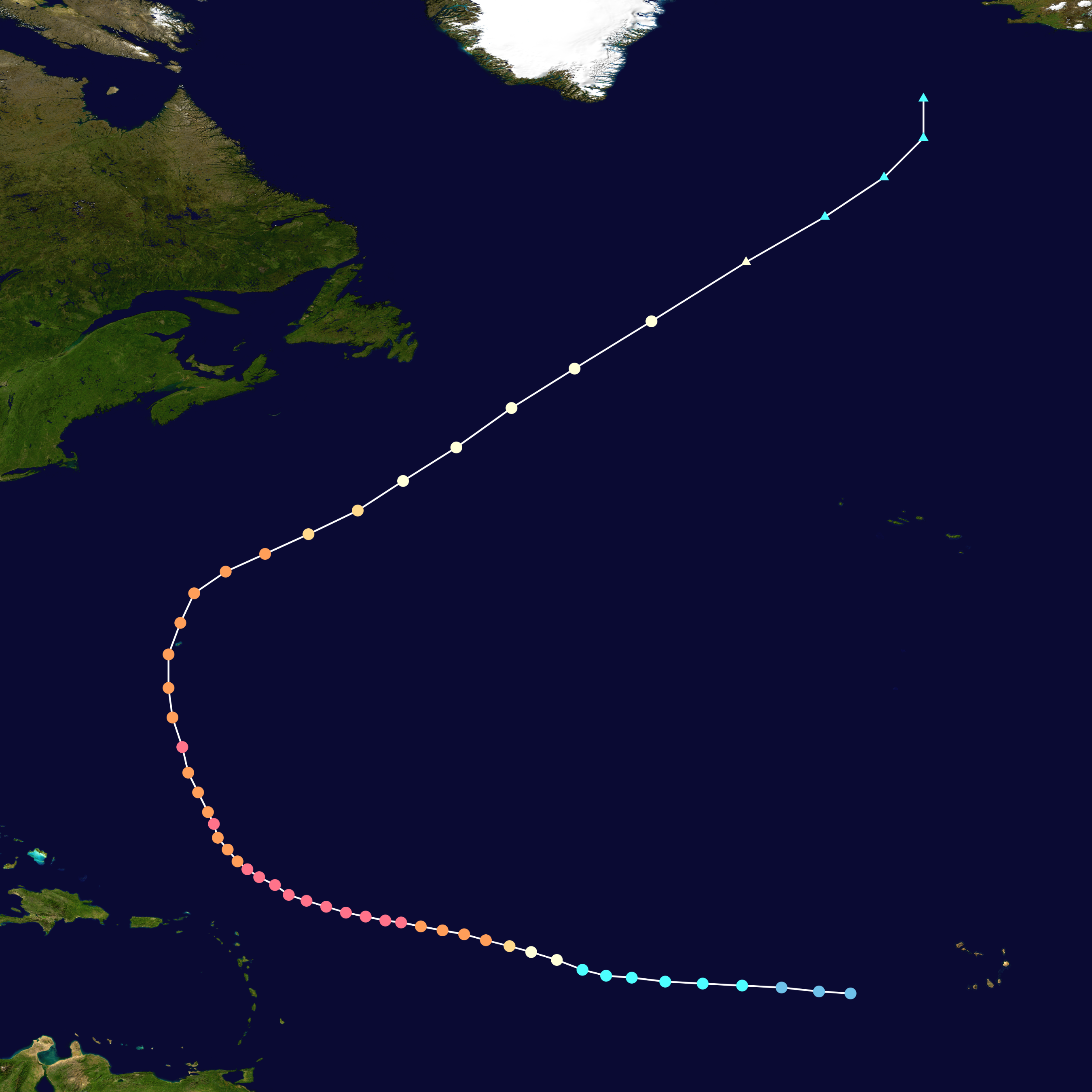
- Duration: August 27 – September 8
- Peak intensity: 145 mph (230 km/h) (1-min); 939 mbar (hPa)

On August 25, a tropical wave exited the west coast of Africa, and two days later developed enough organized convection to become Tropical Depression Ten approximately 420 mi (675 km) west of the Cabo Verde Islands. Tracking through warm waters and low vertical shear, the depression was named Tropical Storm Fabian on August 28. On August 30, the storm intensified into a hurricane, and it quickly strengthened to attain major hurricane status late that day. Fabian reached maximum sustained winds of 145 mph (230 km/h) on September 1, a Category 4 hurricane. The hurricane turned to the north and gradually weakened, although its barometric pressure fell to 939 mbar (27.7 inHg) early on September 4. Fabian then passed about 15 mi (25 km) west of Bermuda late on the next day with winds of 120 mph (190 km/h). The cyclone accelerated northeastward into an environment of unfavorable conditions, becoming extratropical on September 8 roughly 805 mi (1,295 km) east-northeast of Cape Race, Newfoundland. Two days later, the remnants of Fabian merged with another extratropical storm between southern Greenland and Iceland.

Waves generated by Fabian slightly damaged some boats in Antigua and Barbuda, while Puerto Rico reported eroded beaches and part of a construction site being carried away, inflicting about $30,000 in damage. One person drowned at the beach of Isla Verde. In the Dominican Republic, several families evacuated from Nagua after rough seas flooded some homes. Strong waves caused extensive damage to the Bermuda coastline, destroying 10 nests of the endangered Bermuda petrel. The storm surge from the hurricane stranded one vehicle with three police officers and another with a resident on the causeway between St. George's Parish and St. David's Island, later washing both vehicles into Castle Harbour; all four were killed. Strong winds left about 25,000 people without power on the island, and also caused severe damage to vegetation. The strong winds damaged or destroyed the roofs of numerous buildings on Bermuda, Damage on the island totaled $300 million. Elsewhere, strong waves from the hurricane killed a surfer in North Carolina and caused three deaths off of Newfoundland when a fishing vessel sank.

=== Tropical Storm Grace ===
- Tropical storm (SSHWS)
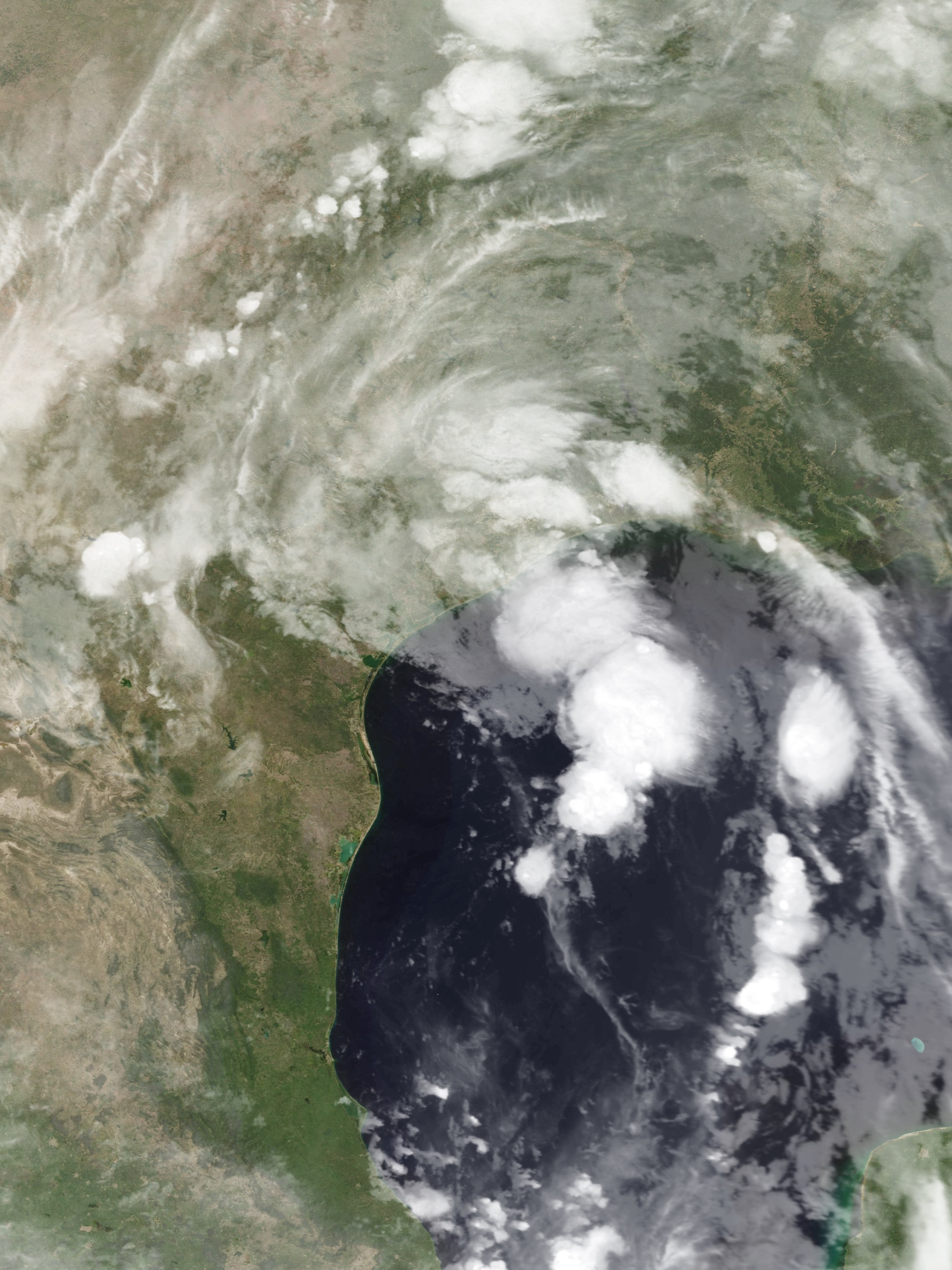
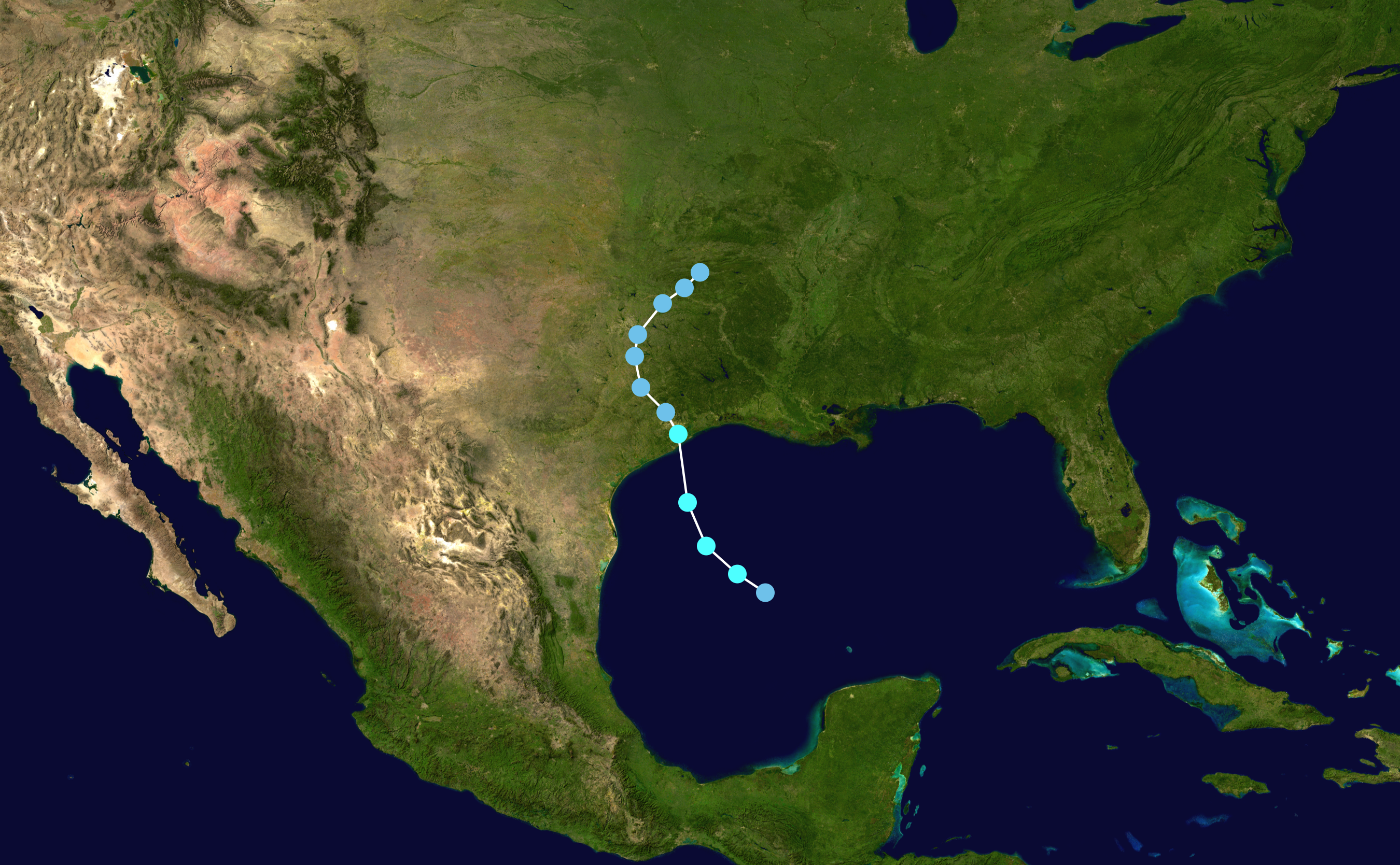
- Duration: August 30 – September 2
- Peak intensity: 40 mph (65 km/h) (1-min); 1007 mbar (hPa)

A strong tropical wave exited western Africa on August 19. Although the system quickly developed outflow and rainbands, it later lost its convection due to dry air. On August 24, the thunderstorms increased as the wave crossed the Lesser Antilles into the Caribbean, where wind shear prevented development. After crossing the Caribbean, the system moved over the Yucatán Peninsula before entering the Gulf of Mexico. On August 29, a low-pressure area developed, which continued to organize as it moved northwestward toward Texas. On August 30, Tropical Depression Eleven formed about 335 miles (539 km) east-southeast of Corpus Christi, Texas. It quickly strengthened into Tropical Storm Grace, with peak winds of 40 mph (65 km/h). Reconnaissance Aircraft had difficulty pinpointing the center amid continued wind shear. The circulation reformed north of the original center, which made landfall on the southwestern portion of Galveston Island on August 31. Grace quickly weakened to a tropical depression over land. After turning northeastward into Oklahoma, the depression was absorbed by a cold front on September 2.

Grace's precursor brought rainfall to the Yucatán Peninsula and Tamaulipas. In Texas, wind gusts reached at 53 mph (85 km/h) at Sea Rim State Park. Rainfall from the storm peaked at 10.36 inches (263 mm) in Spindletop Bayou, causing road and home flooding. Grace produced a storm surge of 3.5 feet (1.1 m) in Matagorda, which flooded coastal structures and low-lying areas while also adding to the beach erosion from Hurricane Claudette one month prior. Statewide damage totaled $113,000 (2003 USD). The remnants of Grace combined with a slow-moving cold front to produce rainfall across the southern United States. Rains in Oklahoma reached 8.98 inches (228 mm) in Courtney, and more than 5 in (130 mm) in Missouri, which brought temporary relief to a severe drought. Near Medford, Oklahoma, floodwaters 2 feet (0.61 m) deep closed portions of U.S. Highway 81. In Poplar Bluff, Missouri, drivers required rescue after their vehicles were trapped. Parts of Indiana received more than 9 in (230 mm) of rainfall, including a record one-day total of 7 inches (180 mm) in Indianapolis. Floods entered 700 homes and overwhelmed the city's sewage system, sending sewage onto the streets. The state's governor declared a state of emergency, and the American Red Cross provided meals to the affected people. Farther east in Maryland, Hagerstown recorded 3.94 inches (100 mm), resulting in flash flooding. In Washington County, the system produced 1.09 inches (28 mm) of rain, a new daily record.

=== Tropical Storm Henri ===
- Tropical storm (SSHWS)
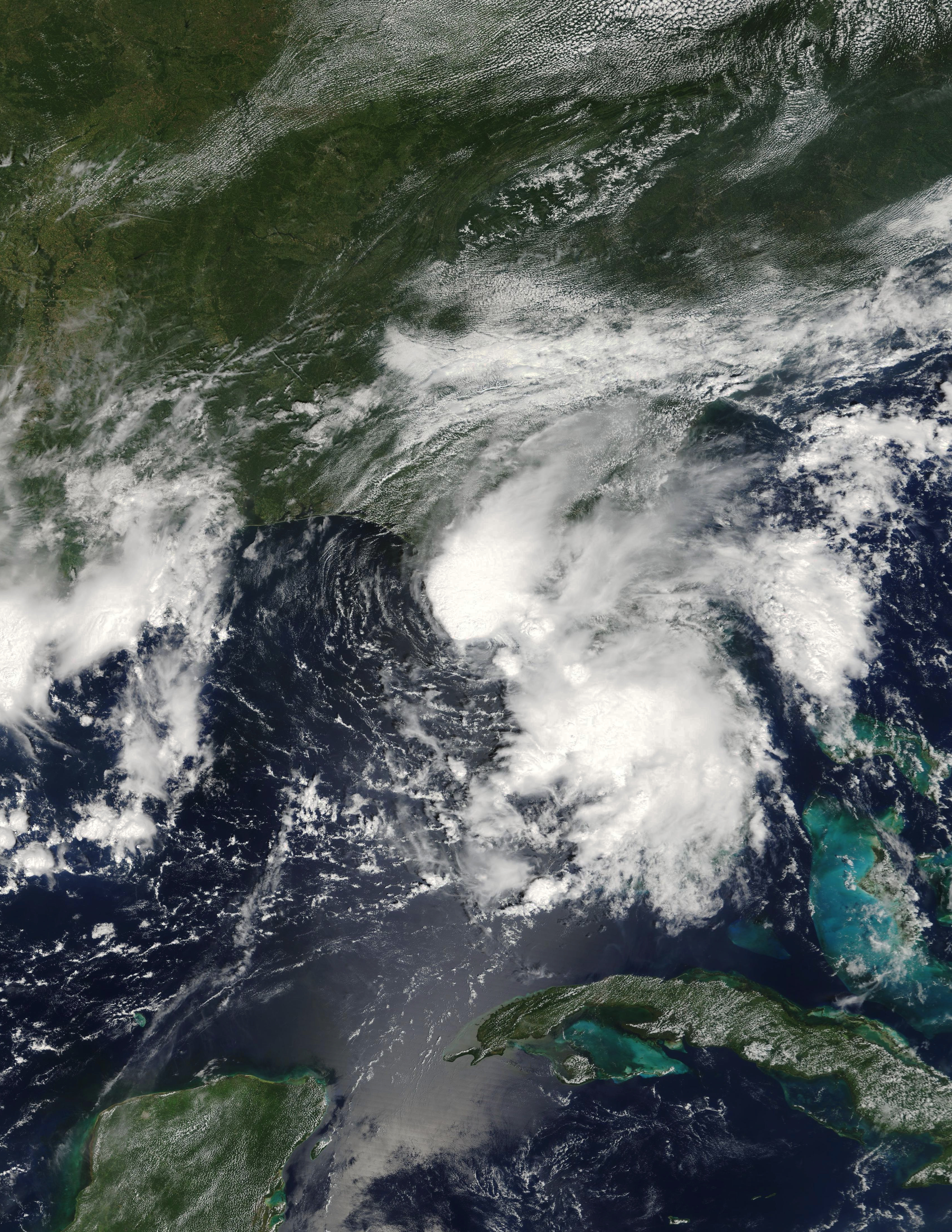
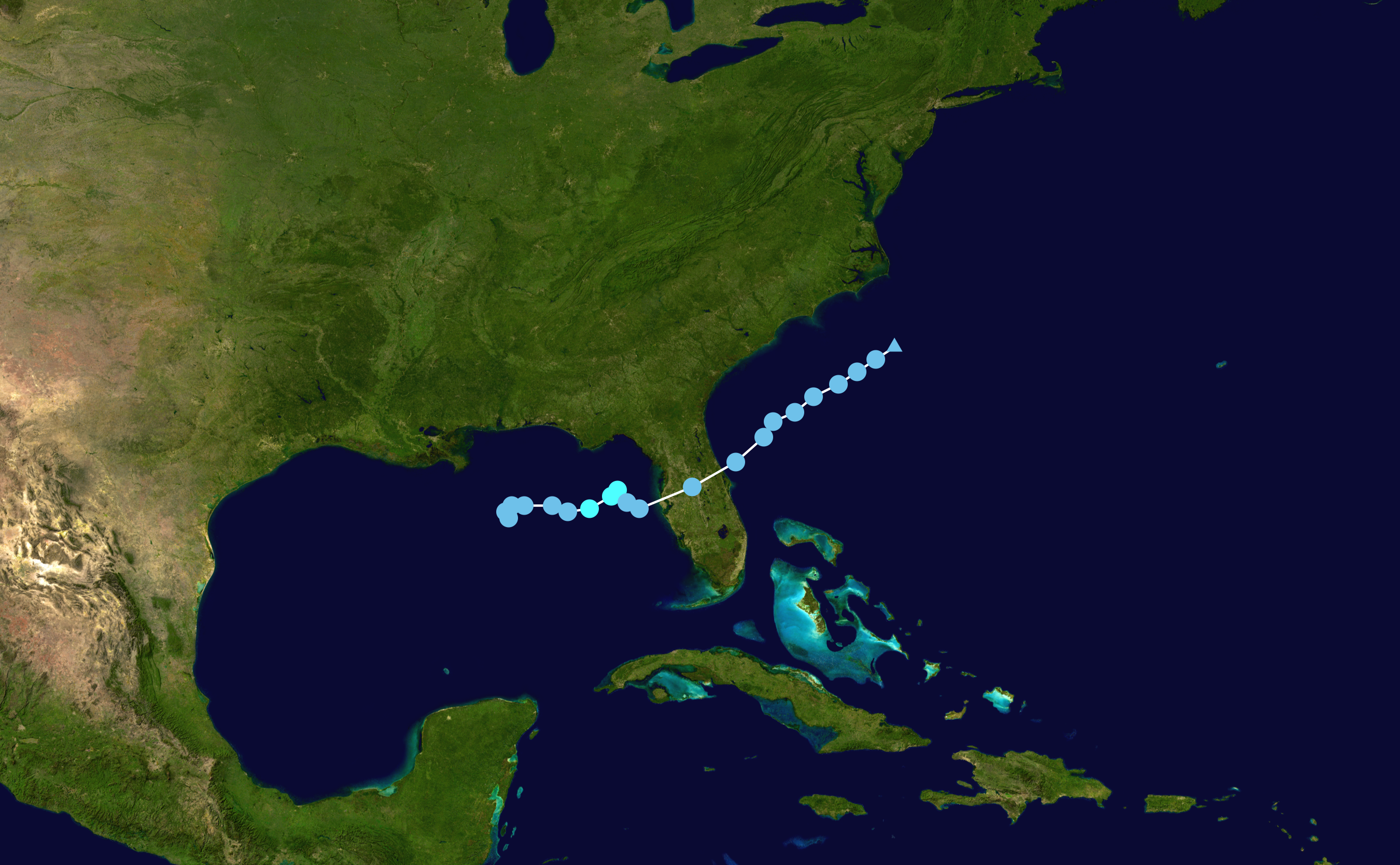
- Duration: September 3 – September 8
- Peak intensity: 60 mph (95 km/h) (1-min); 997 mbar (hPa)

On August 22, a tropical wave moved off the coast of Africa, and it remained disorganized until reaching the eastern Gulf of Mexico on September 1. A tropical disturbance developed into Tropical Depression Twelve on September 3 about 300 mi (485 km) west of Tampa, Florida. It moved eastward and strengthened into Tropical Storm Henri on September 5, and despite strong wind shear it intensified to reach peak winds of 60 mph (97 km/h) later that day. Subsequently, it quickly weakened, and it struck the western Florida coast as a tropical depression. On September 8 it degenerated into a remnant low-pressure area off the coast of North Carolina, and after moving ashore near Cape Hatteras, it crossed the Mid-Atlantic states and dissipated on September 17 over New England.

Henri was responsible for locally heavy rainfall across Florida, but damage was minimal. The remnants of Henri caused heavy precipitation in Delaware and Pennsylvania, causing $19.6 million in damage (2003 USD). In Delaware, the rainfall caused record-breaking river flooding, with part of the Red Clay Creek experiencing a 500-year flood, and the system left 109,000 residents without power in Pennsylvania. The impacts of the storm were severely compounded the following week by Hurricane Isabel across the region.

=== Hurricane Isabel ===
- Category 5 hurricane (SSHWS)
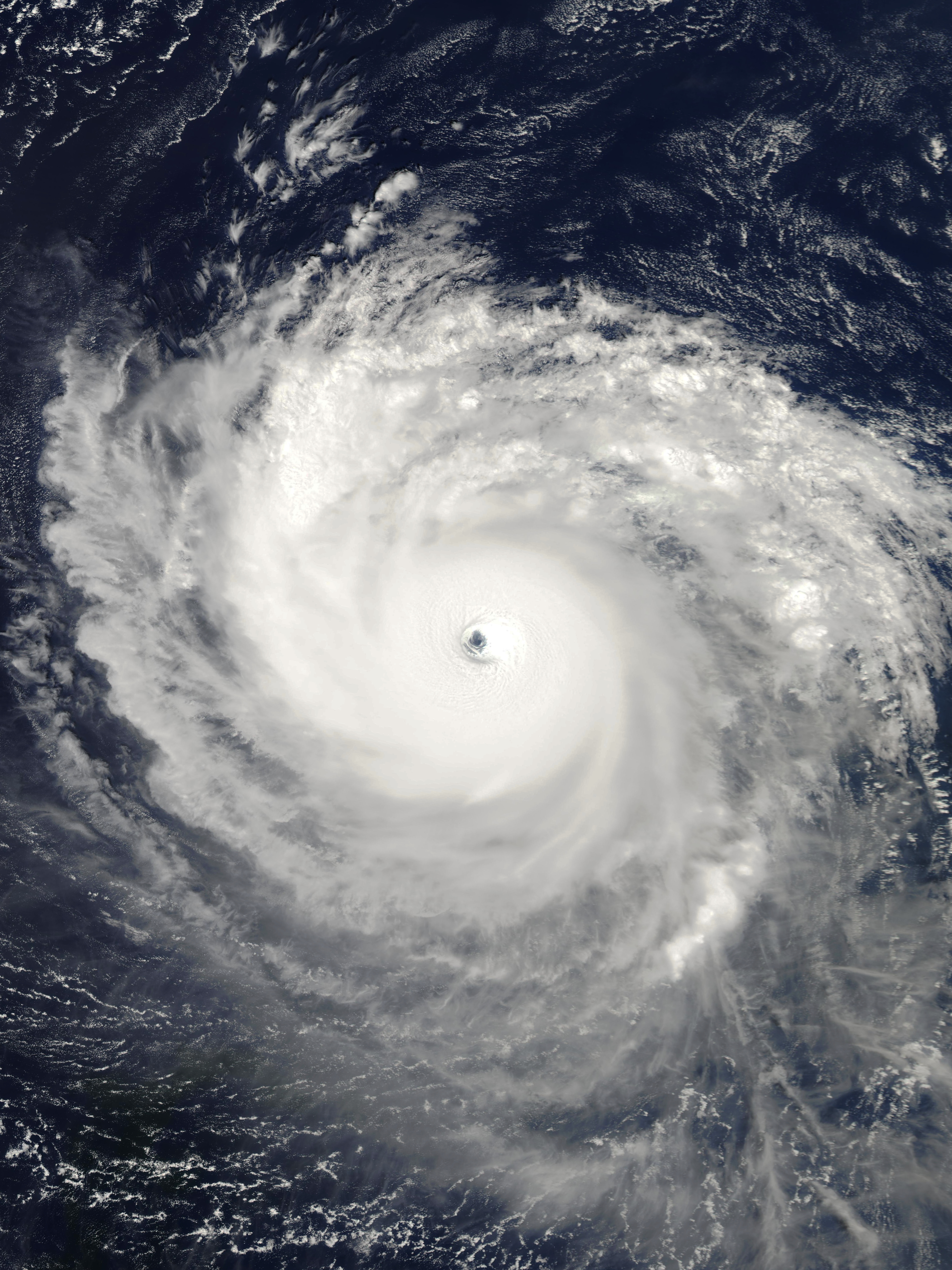
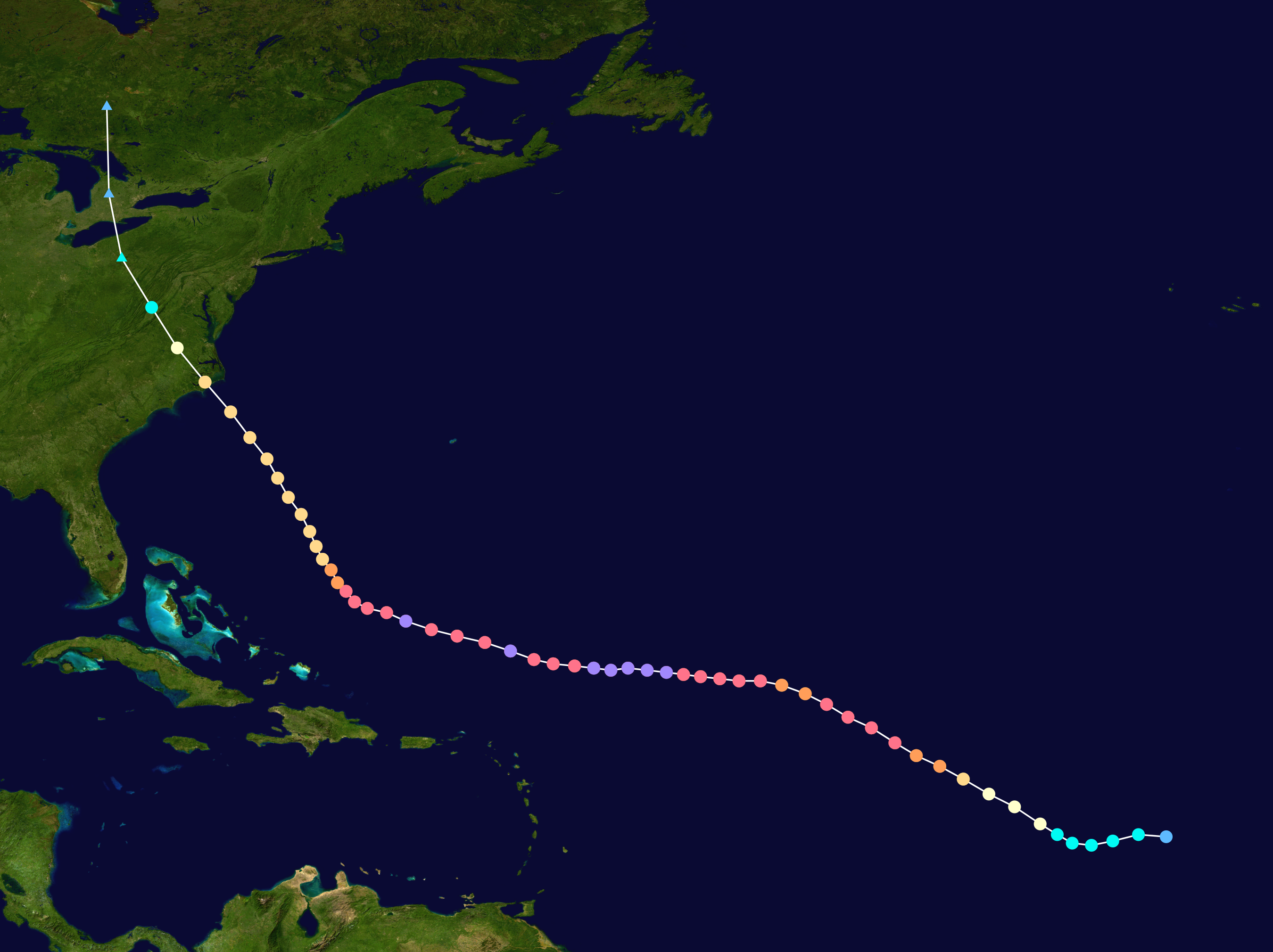
- Duration: September 6 – September 19
- Peak intensity: 165 mph (270 km/h) (1-min); 915 mbar (hPa)

A tropical wave moved off the coast of Africa on September 1 and developed into Tropical Depression Thirteen early on September 6 about 470 mi (755 km) west-southwest of the Cabo Verde Islands. It quickly intensified into Tropical Storm Isabel, and it continued to gradually strengthen because of light wind shear and warm waters. Isabel strengthened to a hurricane on September 7, and the following day it attained major hurricane status. Its intensity fluctuated over the subsequent days as it passed north of the Lesser Antilles, and peaked with winds of 165 mph (270 km/h) and a minimum pressure of 915 mbar (27.0 inHg) on September 11, a Category 5 hurricane on the Saffir–Simpson scale. The hurricane oscillated between Category 4 and Category 5 status over the following four days before weakening due to wind shear. On September 18, Isabel made landfall between Cape Lookout and Ocracoke Island in North Carolina with winds of 105 mph (165 km/h). It continued northwestward, becoming extratropical over western Pennsylvania before being absorbed by a larger storm over Ontario on September 19.

Strong winds from Isabel extended from North Carolina to New England and westward to West Virginia. The winds, combined with previous rainfall which moistened the soil, downed many trees and power lines across its path, leaving about 6 million electricity customers without power at some point. Coastal areas suffered from waves and its powerful storm surge, with areas in eastern North Carolina and southeast Virginia reporting severe damage from both winds and the storm surge. In the former, Isabel damaged thousands of homes in Dare County alone. Virginia reported that Isabel destroyed more than 1,186 homes and 77 businesses, severely damaged 9,110 homes and 333 businesses, and left 107,908 homes and over 1,000 businesses with minor damage. Several other states reported flooding and strong winds, particularly in central Maryland, where the storm destroyed 472 buildings and dwellings while substantially damaging 3,260 others. Across the United States, Isabel resulted in $5.5 billion in damage and 51 deaths, of which 17 were directly related to the storm's effects. In Canada, the remnants of Isabel left slick roads in Ontario, leading to one indirect death after a truck driver lost control of the vehicle.

=== Tropical Depression Fourteen ===
- Tropical depression (SSHWS)
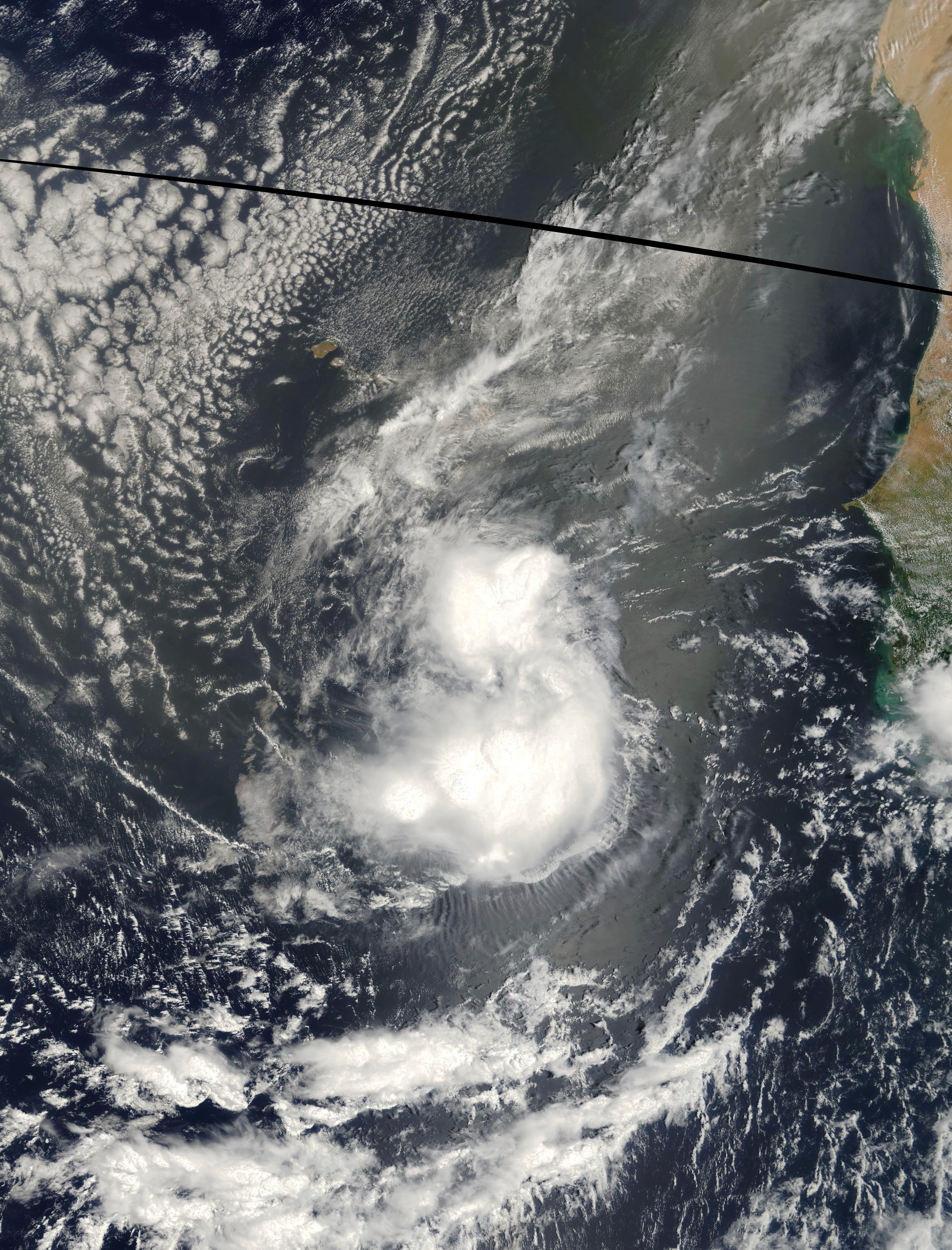
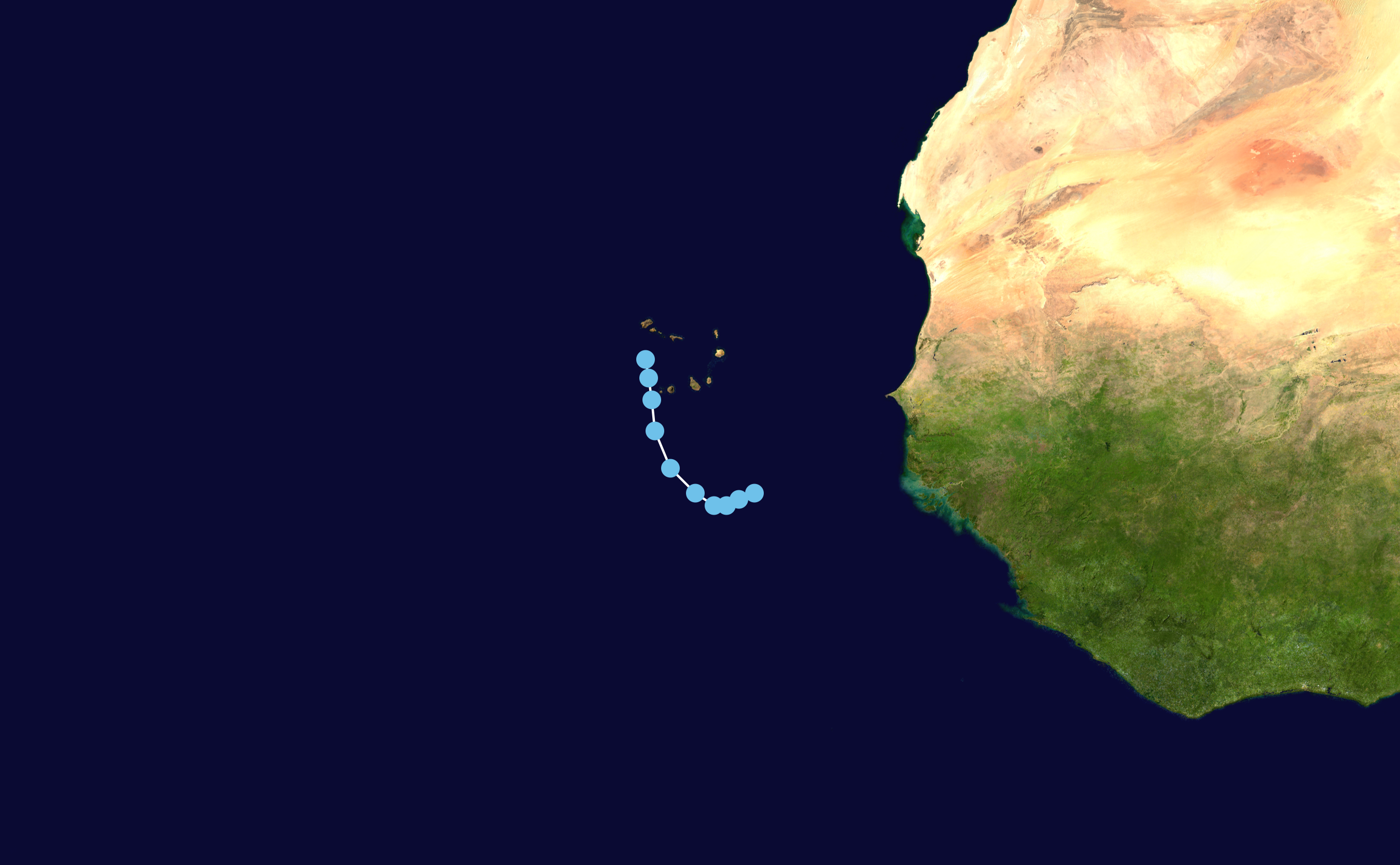
- Duration: September 8 – September 10
- Peak intensity: 35 mph (55 km/h) (1-min); 1007 mbar (hPa)

A strong tropical wave moved off the coast of Africa on September 6, and almost immediately it became associated with a broad surface circulation. Favorable upper-level winds allowed the system to quickly organize into Tropical Depression Fourteen while located about 290 mi (465 km) southeast of the southernmost Cape Verde islands on September 8. Despite nearby dry air, the depression was forecast to intensify to hurricane status due to anticipated favorable conditions. However, convection soon decreased and the banding features dissipated. On September 9, the system was not forecast to intensify past minimal tropical storm status, but instead peaked with winds of 35 mph (55 km/h) and a minimum pressure of 1,007 mbar (29.7 inHg). Later that day, an upper-level low to the west of the system increased wind shear and caused a steady north-northwest motion for the depression. The circulation became elongated and separated from the convection as it passed just west of the Cape Verde Islands, where it brought heavy rainfall, and on September 10 the depression dissipated.

=== Hurricane Juan ===
- Category 2 hurricane (SSHWS)
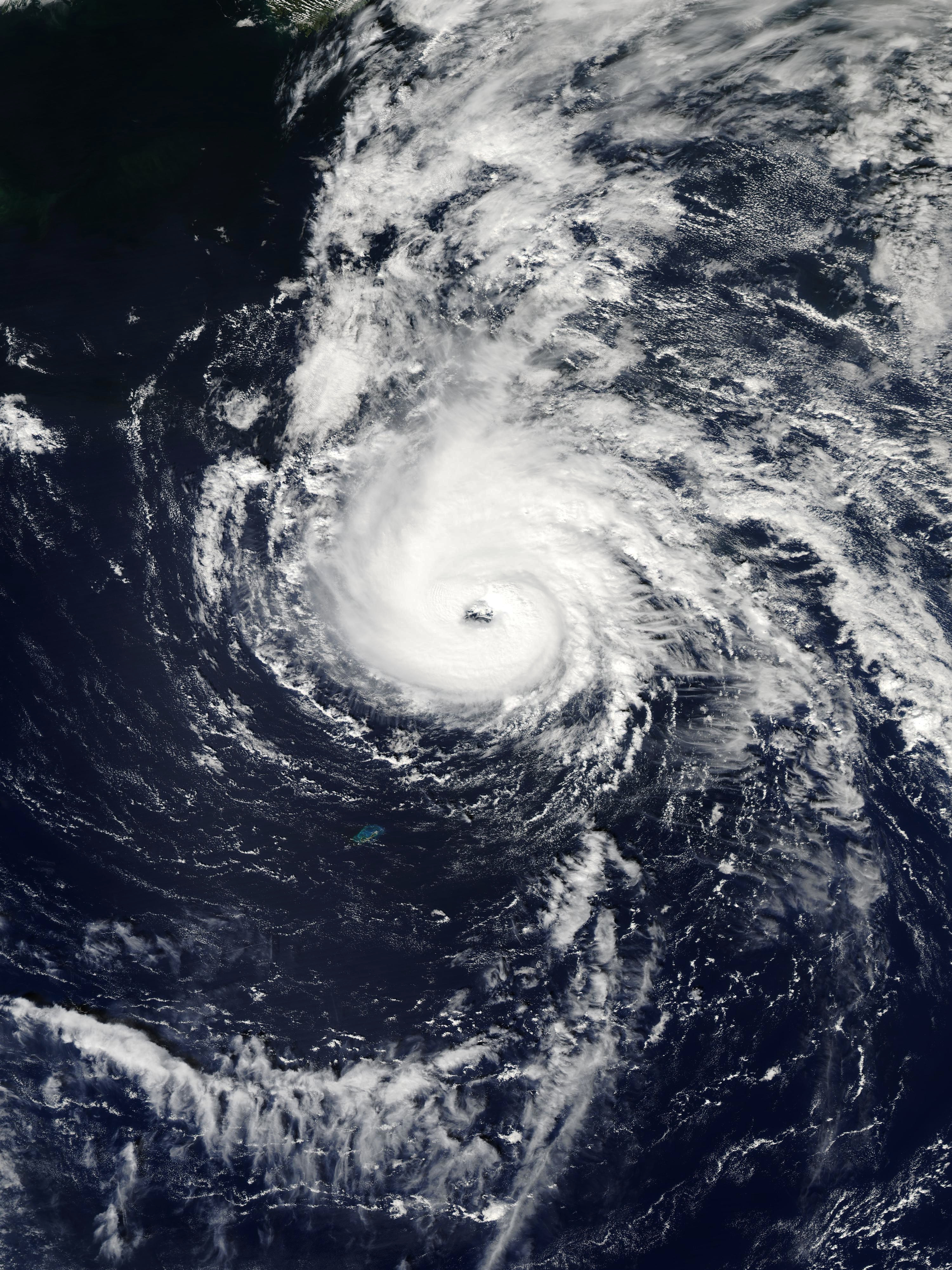
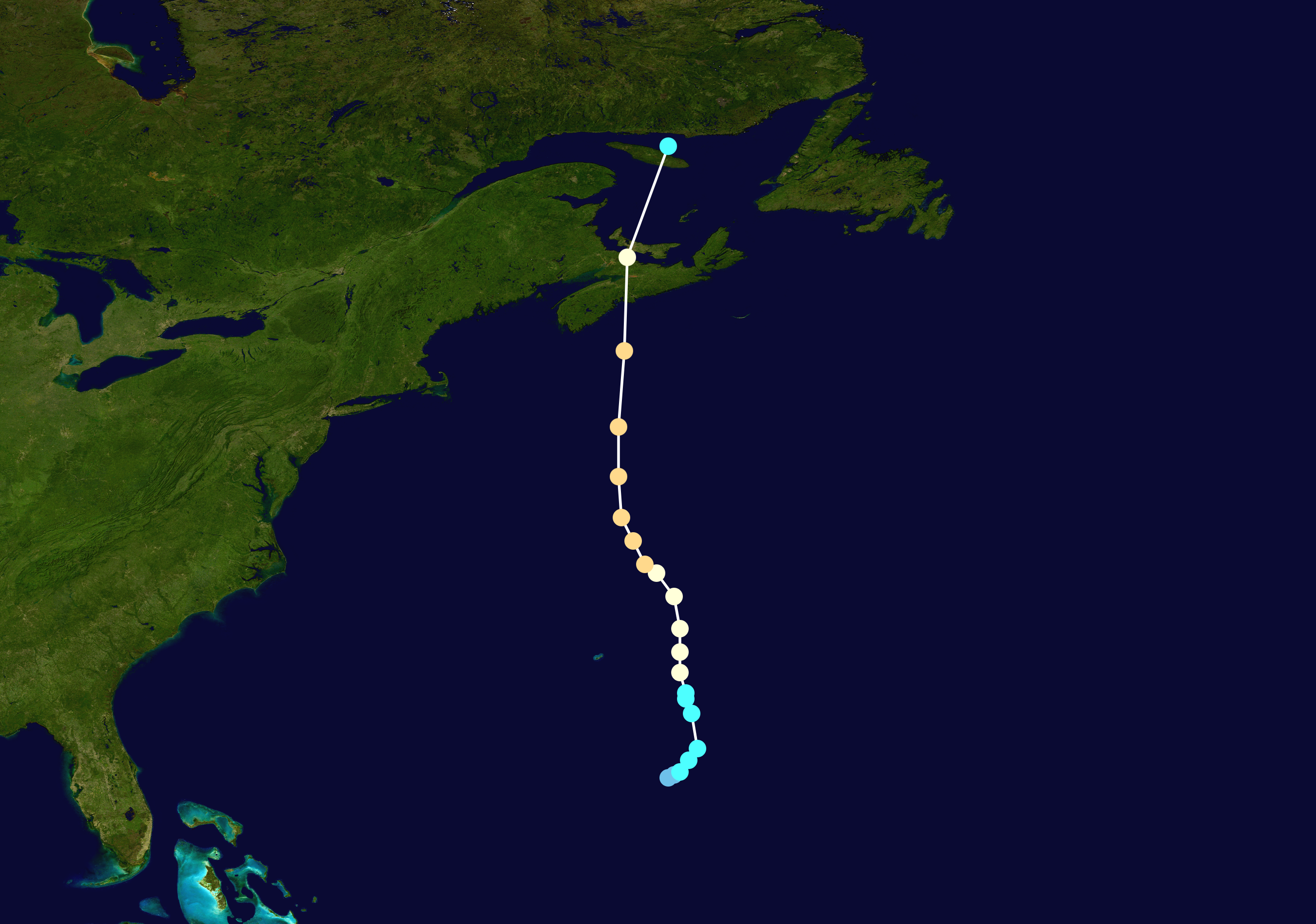
- Duration: September 24 – September 29
- Peak intensity: 105 mph (165 km/h) (1-min); 969 mbar (hPa)

A large tropical wave moved off the coast of Africa on September 14, and due to unfavorable wind shear it initially remained disorganized. An area of convection increased in association with an upper-level low, and it developed into Tropical Depression Fifteen on September 24 to the southeast of Bermuda. It steadily organized as it tracked northward, intensifying into Tropical Storm Juan on September 25 and attaining hurricane status on September 26. With warm waters and light wind shear, Juan reached peak winds of 105 mph (165 km/h) and a minimum pressure of 969 mbar (28.6 inHg) on September 27 about 635 mi (1,020 km) south of Halifax, Nova Scotia. It accelerated northward, weakening only slightly before moving ashore near Halifax on September 29 with winds of 100 mph (160 km/h). It quickly weakened while crossing the southern Canadian Maritimes before being absorbed by a large extratropical cyclone over the Gulf of St. Lawrence.

The eyewall of Juan was the first to directly cross over Halifax since the 1893 San Roque hurricane; the cyclone became one of the most devastating cyclones in modern history for the city, with the local government estimating that approximately 31% of homes suffered damage to some extent. The hurricane produced a record storm surge of 4.9 ft (1.5 m), which resulted in extensive flooding of the Halifax and Dartmouth waterfront properties. Strong winds caused widespread occurrences of downed power lines and damaged houses. Strong winds downed thousands of trees. High winds also impacted areas around Gulf of St. Lawrence, causing some damage on Prince Edward Island. Between 800,000 and 900,000 people were left without power in Nova Scotia and Prince Edward Island. Overall, Juan was responsible for four direct deaths and four indirect deaths and approximately $200 million (2003 CAD; $150 million 2003 USD) in damage.

=== Hurricane Kate ===
- Category 3 hurricane (SSHWS)
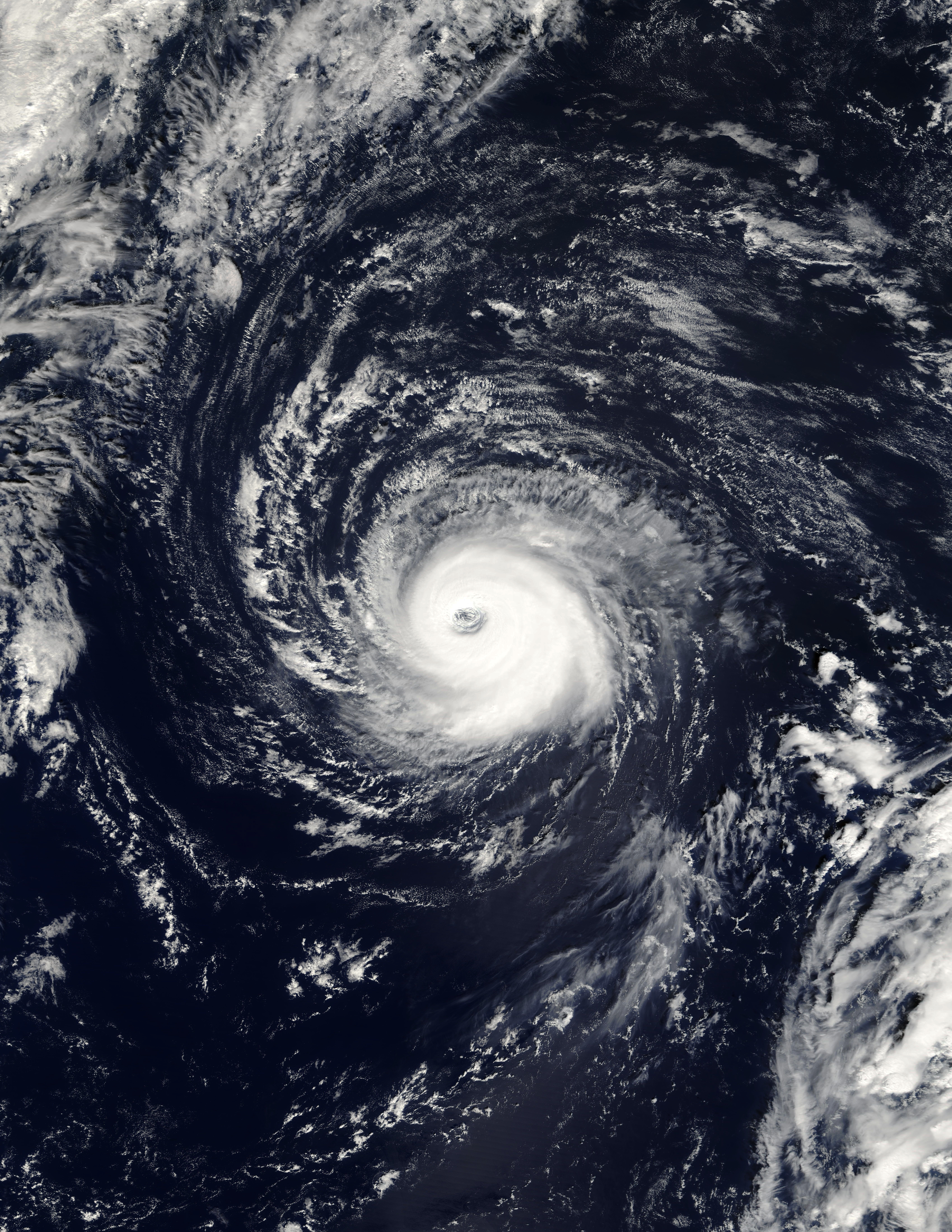
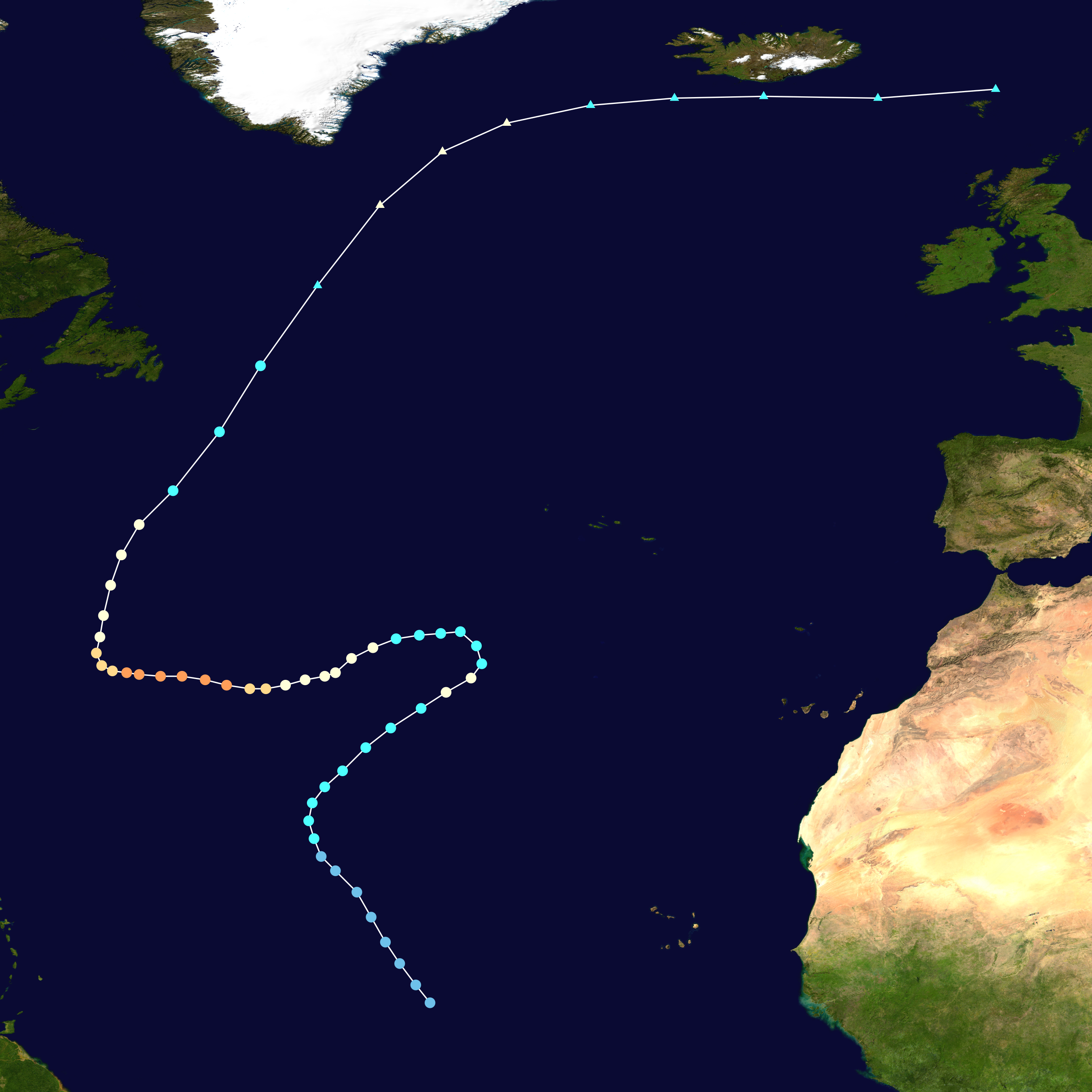
- Duration: September 25 – October 7
- Peak intensity: 125 mph (205 km/h) (1-min); 952 mbar (hPa)

On September 21, a tropical wave exited the west coast of Africa. It organized into Tropical Depression Sixteen on September 25 about 920 mi (1,480 km) west-southwest of the Cabo Verde Islands. The depression failed to intensify at first due to wind shear, but it strengthened into Tropical Storm Kate on September 27. The storm turned to the northeast, steered by a trough to its north. Despite the wind shear, Kate developed an eye and attained hurricane status for about 12 hours on September 29. Later that day, Kate weakened, became disorganized, and slowed, curving westward around a mid-level circulation. By October 1, the storm was moving west-southwestward in an area of warmer waters and lighter wind shear and regained hurricane status that day. A well-defined eye developed by October 2. On October 3, Kate became a major hurricane, and on October 4, peaked with winds of 125 mph (205 km/h) and a minimum pressure of 952 mbar (28.1 inHg). Around that time, Kate had a nearly-solid ring of convection around a well-defined eye. Kate then started weakening as it slowed and turned northward along the western periphery of the subtropical ridge. An approaching trough accelerated the northward movement, while also increasing wind shear. The eye re-appeared occasionally on satellite imagery until early on October 7, when Kate moved over cooler waters and weakened to a tropical storm. After passing east of Newfoundland, Kate became extratropical early on October 8. The extratropical remnants reattained hurricane-force winds while passing southeast of Greenland on October 9 and then turned eastward, moving a short distance south of Iceland and later merging with another extratropical storm near Scandinavia on October 10.

The interaction between Kate and a high pressure area to its north produced 3–4 ft (0.91–1.22 m) waves along the coast of North Carolina and New England. In Atlantic Canada, a cruise ship was redirected to avoid the storm. Kate produced sustained winds of up to 40 mph (64 km/h) at Cape Race, Newfoundland. It generated strong swells and surf along the southern coast of the Avalon Peninsula, reaching heights of 9–13 ft (2.7–4.0 m). Rainfall in southeastern Newfoundland reached over 4 in (100 mm). St. John's reported 1.8 in (46 mm) on October 6, a record for the date, but not enough to cause flooding. The remnants of Kate produced 70 mph (110 km/h) wind gusts in northern Scotland.

=== Tropical Storm Larry ===
- Tropical storm (SSHWS)
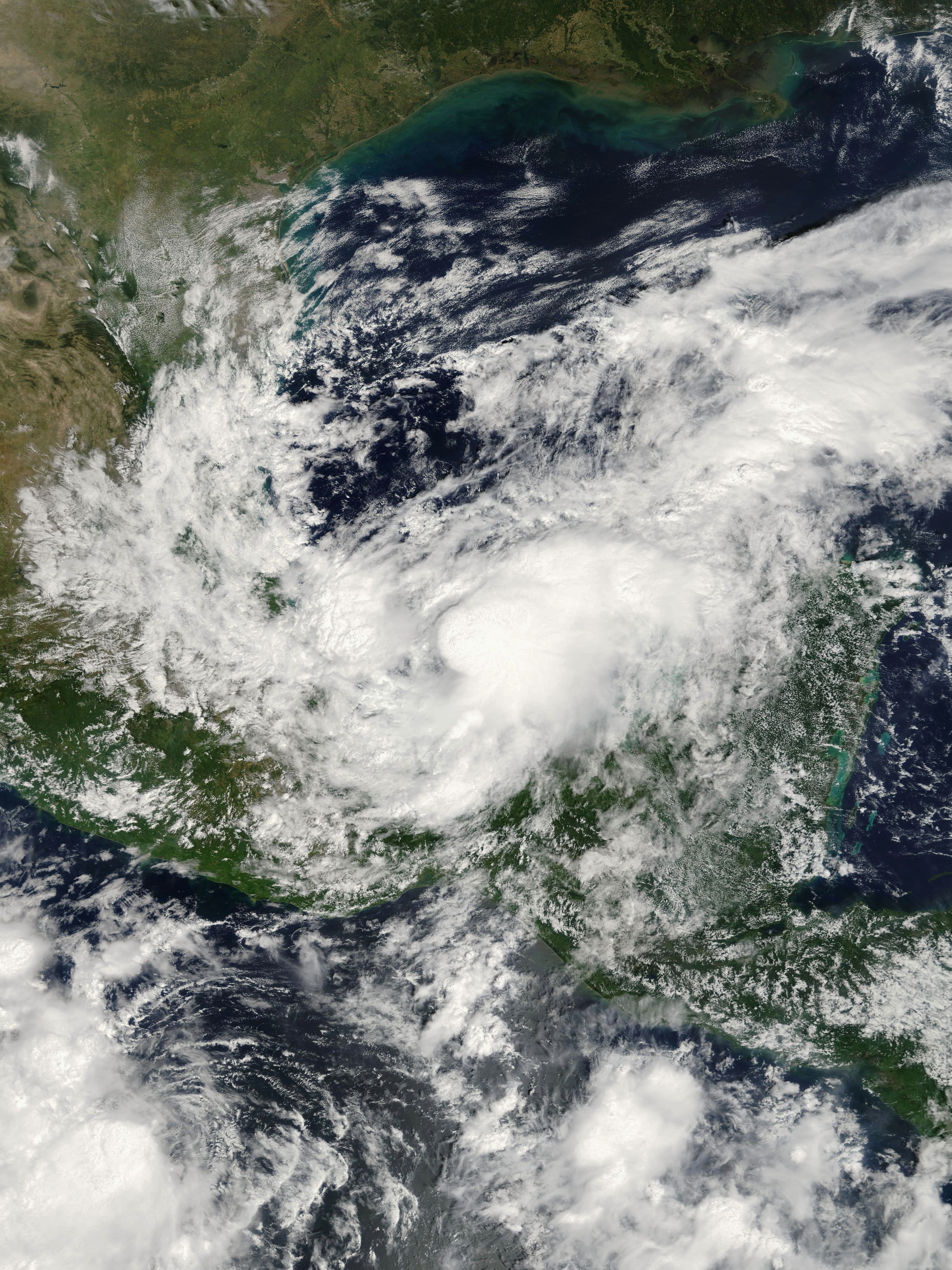
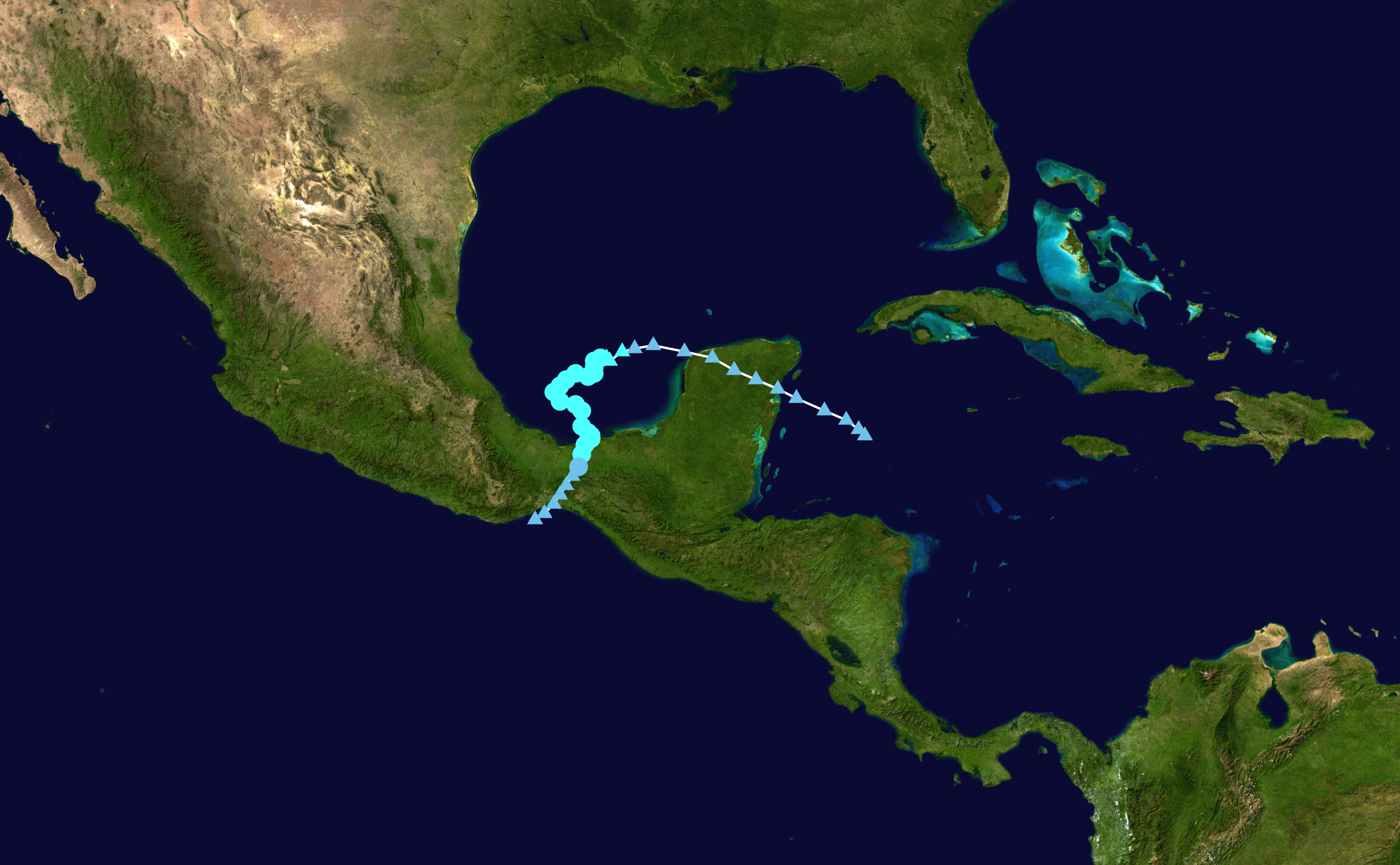
- Duration: October 1 – October 7
- Peak intensity: 65 mph (100 km/h) (1-min); 993 mbar (hPa)

A tropical wave moved off the coast of Africa on September 17, and moved across the Atlantic. Wind shear prevented organization until September 26, when the wave moved under an anticyclone in the western Caribbean, and a weak low pressure area developed. The system moved over land on September 29, and a day later emerged into the southern Gulf of Mexico, where the low merged with a stationary frontal boundary. A large high-pressure system over the northern gulf forced the storm southward, causing more thunderstorms to develop. It gradually transitioned into a tropical cyclone, completing the process on October 1, at which time the NHC named it Larry. At that time, the storm was located 300 mi (480 km) east-southeast of Tampico, Mexico. Larry strengthened further, reaching peak winds of 65 mph (105 km/h) on October 3. A mid-level ridge forced the storm more to the south-southeast. Larry made landfall at Paraíso, Tabasco, on October 5, with winds of 60 mph (95 km/h). It was the first landfall in the region since Hurricane Brenda in 1973. The next day, Larry weakened into a tropical depression and degenerated into a remnant low. The remnants of Larry turned to the southwest, reaching the eastern Pacific on October 7, and dissipating a day later.

Due to the threat of the storm, Mexican officials closed oil and shipping ports along the Bay of Campeche, while opening 75 shelters. Larry caused flooding and mudslides throughout the region due to dropping up to 24.77 in (629 mm) of precipitation at Unión Juárez, Chiapas, and coincided with the landfall in southwestern Mexico of two Pacific tropical cyclones, Nora and Olaf, adding to the impact. The three storms combined damaged over 21,000 homes across the country. Damage was greatest around the Chiapas capital of Tuxtla Gutiérrez, where over 9,000 houses were affected. The rainfall caused mudslides across the country, hospitalizing two individuals in central Hidalgo. Larry also heavily damaged crops and knocked out telephone and electrical services. The storm resulted in five deaths and around $53.4 million in damage in Mexico. The remnants of Larry compounded heavy rains that previously fell in El Salvador, killing at least one person, forcing thousands of people to evacuate and damaging or destroying hundreds of homes.

=== Tropical Storm Mindy ===
- Tropical storm (SSHWS)
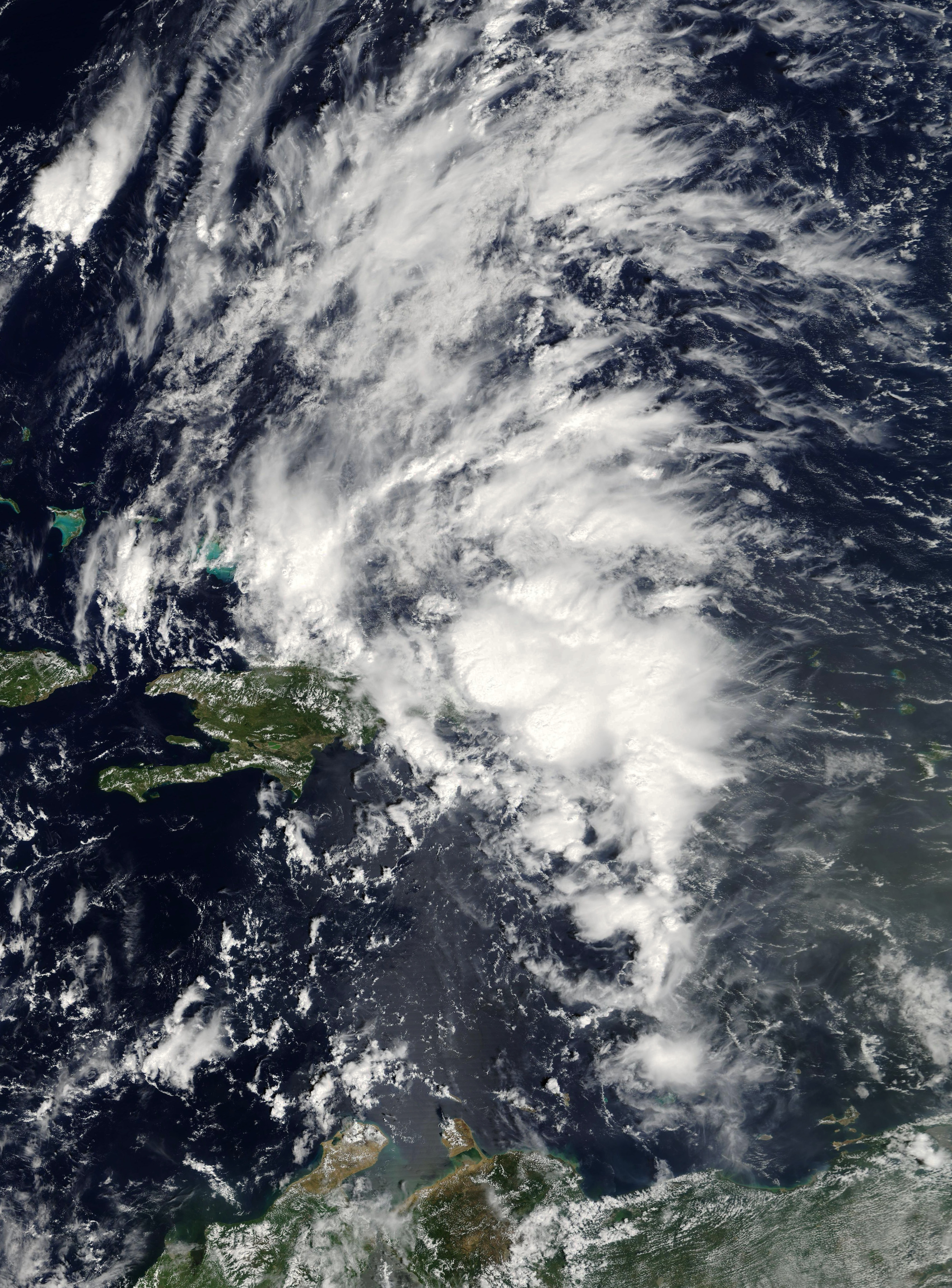
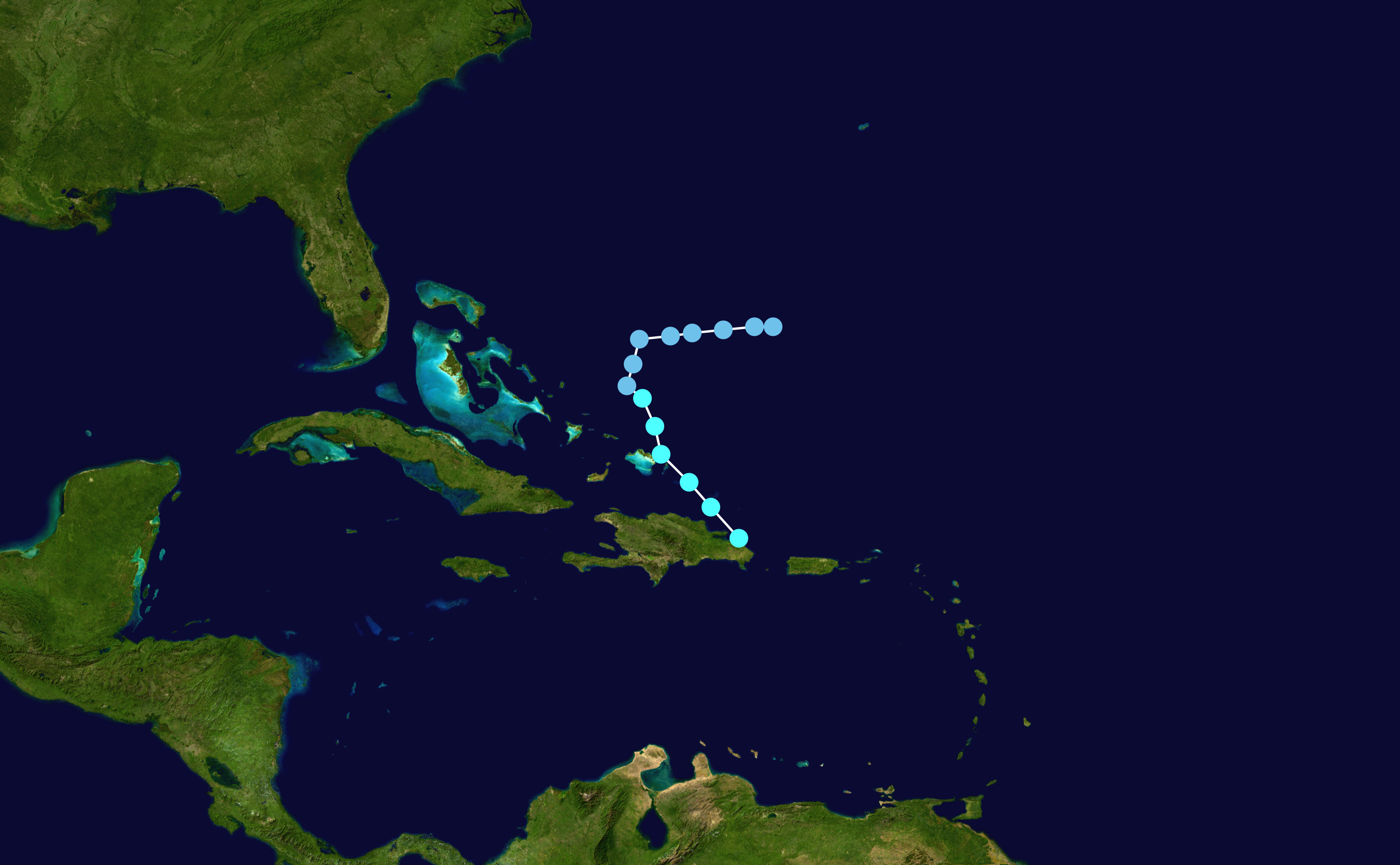
- Duration: October 10 – October 14
- Peak intensity: 45 mph (75 km/h) (1-min); 1002 mbar (hPa)

A tropical wave exited the coast of Africa on October 1 and moved westward. On October 8, thunderstorms spread across the Lesser Antilles, and the wave slowly organized. Rainfall reached 2.98 in (76 mm) in Christiansted in Saint Croix, and 7.13 in (181 mm) near Ponce, Puerto Rico. The heavy rains led to flooding, downed trees, and landslides that wrecked two bridges and affected four roads. One car was inundated, and a few houses were flooded. Strong winds left around 29,000 people without power in northeastern Puerto Rico. Damage totaled $50,000.

The disturbance turned northwestward through a weakness in the subtropical ridge, and despite strong wind shear, became Tropical Storm Mindy late on October 10 over eastern Dominican Republic, with winds of 45 mph (75 km/h) and a minimum pressure of 1,002 mbar (29.6 inHg). It produced 2.63 in (67 mm) of rain in Santiago Rodríguez, which caused flooding and damaged 320 houses. Although forecast to intensify to 65 mph (105 km/h) winds, Mindy weakened due to the wind shear. The center passed near the Turks and Caicos Islands on October 11, and winds reached only 31 mph (50 km/h) at Grand Turk Island. On October 12, Mindy weakened to a tropical depression, and later turned eastward due to an approaching short-wave trough. Devoid of deep convection, the circulation dissipated on October 14 about 445 mi (715 km) south-southwest of Bermuda. Mindy produced 2 to 3 ft (0.61 to 0.91 m) swells along the U.S. Atlantic coast from Florida through North Carolina.

=== Tropical Storm Nicholas ===
- Tropical storm (SSHWS)
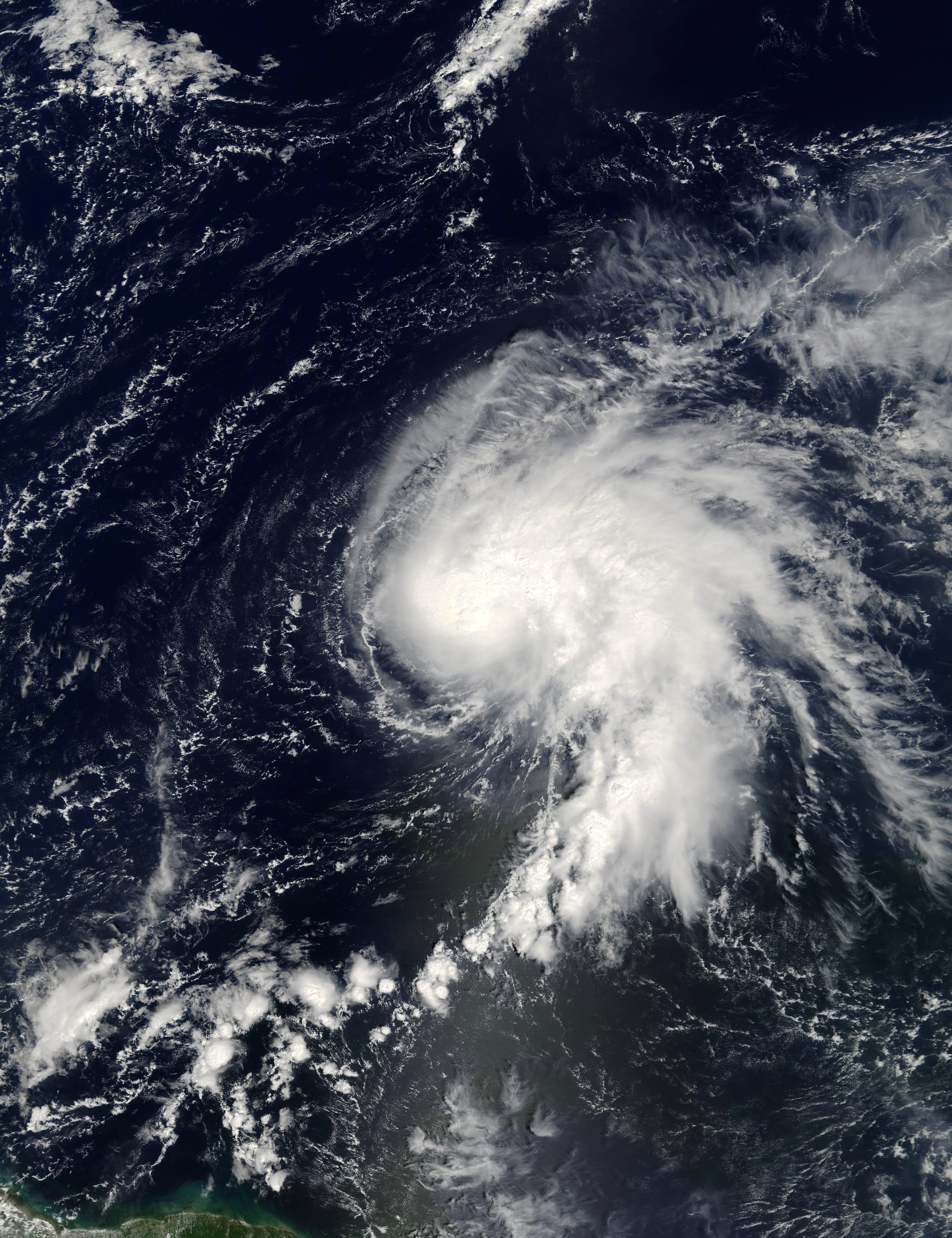
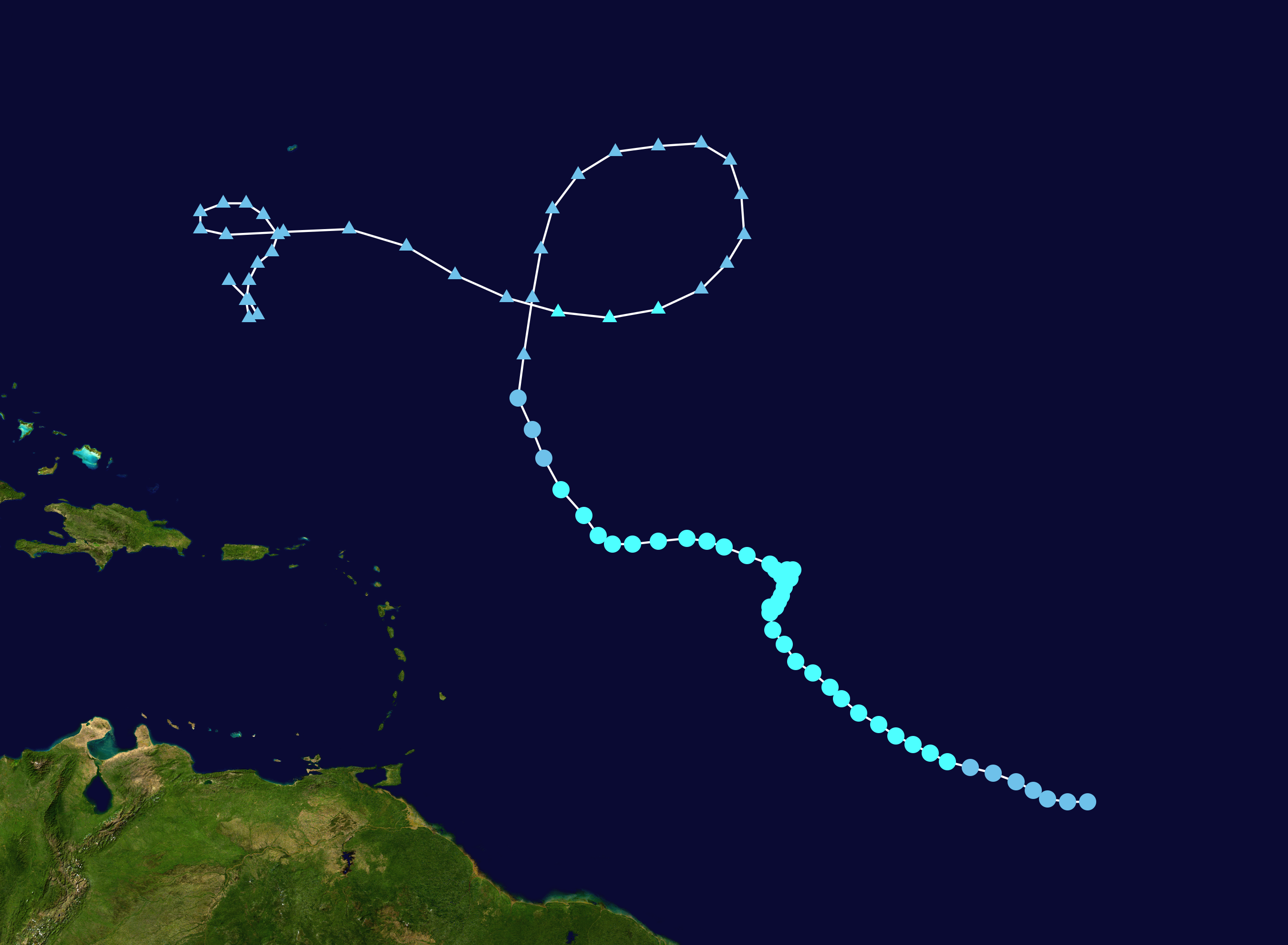
- Duration: October 13 – October 23
- Peak intensity: 70 mph (110 km/h) (1-min); 990 mbar (hPa)

A tropical wave moved off the coast of Africa on October 9. It developed into a tropical depression on October 13 roughly 1,030 mi (1,660 km) west-southwest of the Cabo Verde Islands. Despite wind shear, the depression strengthened into Tropical Storm Nicholas on October 14. It moved west-northwest due to a subtropical ridge to its north. After the shear diminished, Nicholas developed banding features as its convection organized. On October 17, Nicholas attained peak winds of 70 mph (110 km/h) and a minimum pressure of 990 mbar (29 inHg). Afterward, increasing wind shear weakened Nichola. The storm then turned northward on October 18 due to a break in the ridge. After weakening to a minimal tropical storm on October 20, Nicholas briefly restrengthened, but fell to tropical depression status on October 23. A day later, the cyclone became extratropical about 580 mi (935 km) southeast of Bermuda. The remnants of Nicholas executed a large anticyclonic loop, resulting in a westward motion and some re-intensification on October 27. The storm executed another loop to the south, before being absorbed by a non-tropical low on November 1. The remnant system continued westward, striking Florida two days later. The system produced heavy surf, rip currents, and a wind gust of 35 mph (56 km/h) at Cape Canaveral. The system later crossed the Gulf of Mexico and moved ashore Louisiana on November 5.

=== Tropical Storm Odette ===
- Tropical storm (SSHWS)
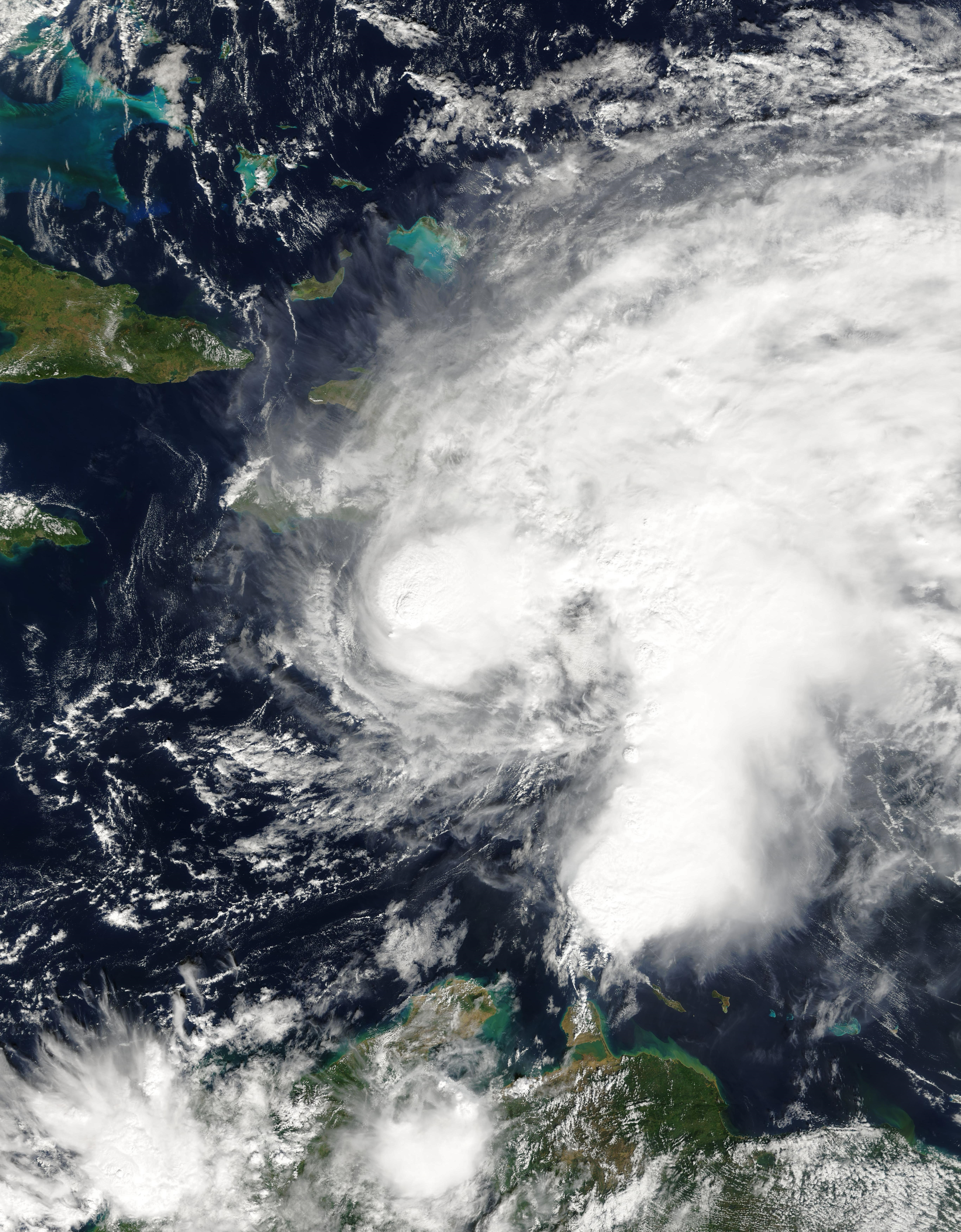
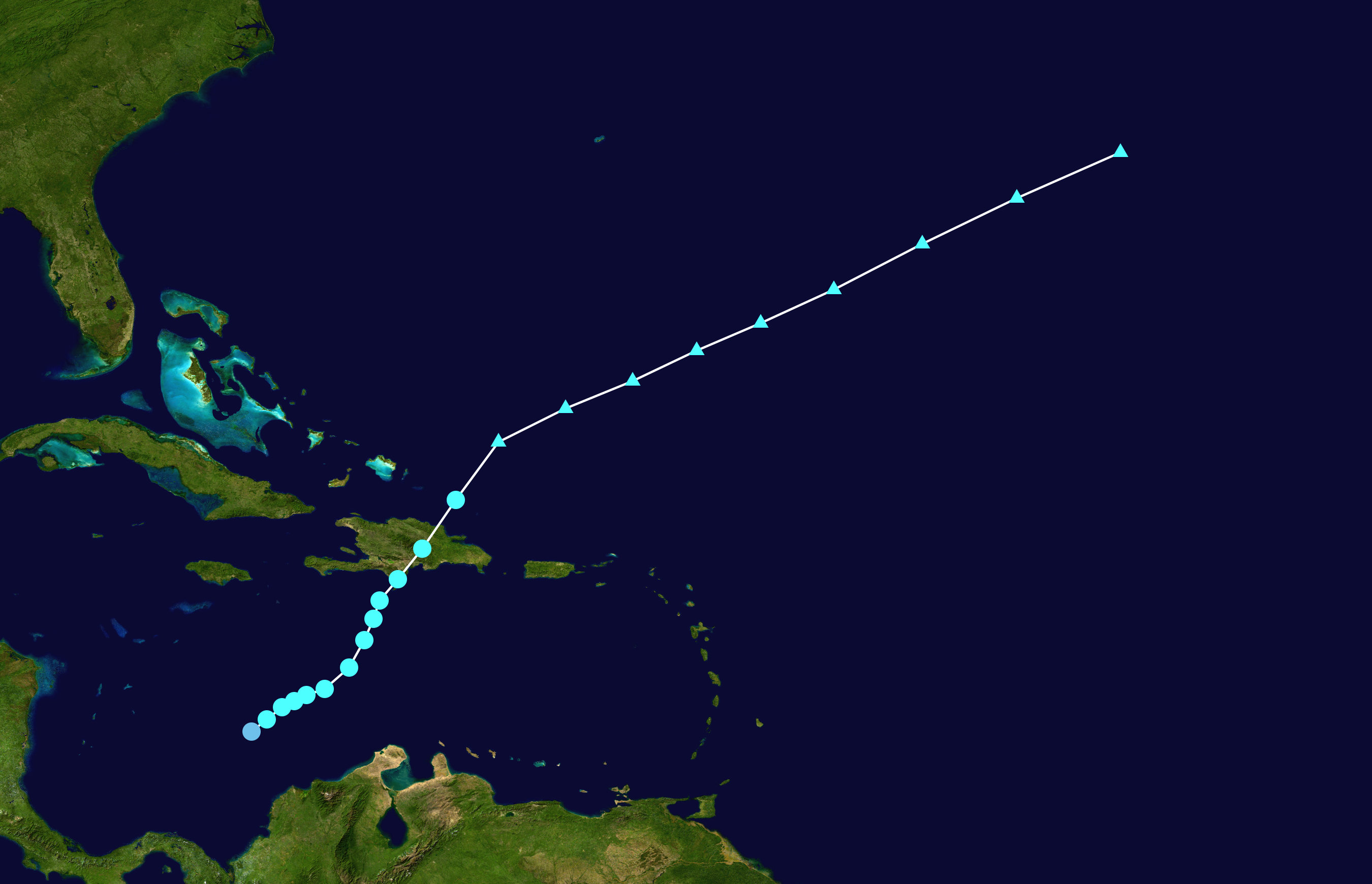
- Duration: December 4 – December 7
- Peak intensity: 65 mph (100 km/h) (1-min); 993 mbar (hPa)

A low-pressure area formed within a frontal zone on December 1 near Panama. The low separated from the frontal zone and organized into a tropical depression on December 4 about 345 mi (555 km) south of Kingston, Jamaica. The depression quickly intensified into Tropical Storm Odette, the first in December since Hurricane Lili in 1984 and only the second on record to form that month in the Caribbean, after a hurricane in 1822. Odette strengthened, with its minimum pressure decreasing to 993 mbar (29.3 inHg) on December 5 and its winds increasing to 65 mph (100 km/h) on the following day. The storm landfall near Cabo Falso in the Dominican Republic on December 6 after weakening slightly. A day later, Odette entered the Atlantic and became extratropical about 220 mi (355 km) north of Hispaniola, and eventually merged with a cold front.

The early stage of Odette and its precursor brought rainfall to Colombia, Costa Rica, Jamaica, Nicaragua, and Panama. Eight deaths were directly attributed to this tropical storm in the Dominican Republic due to mudslides or flash flooding. In addition, two deaths were indirectly caused by the storm. Approximately 35% of the nation's banana crop was lost, while the storm also damaged approximately 60,000 homes and destroyed 34 others. Crop damage alone totaled about $8 million. Floodwaters washed away at least two bridges and mudslides covered several roads. Light to moderate rainfall was reported in Puerto Rico and the United States Virgin Islands.

=== Tropical Storm Peter ===
- Tropical storm (SSHWS)
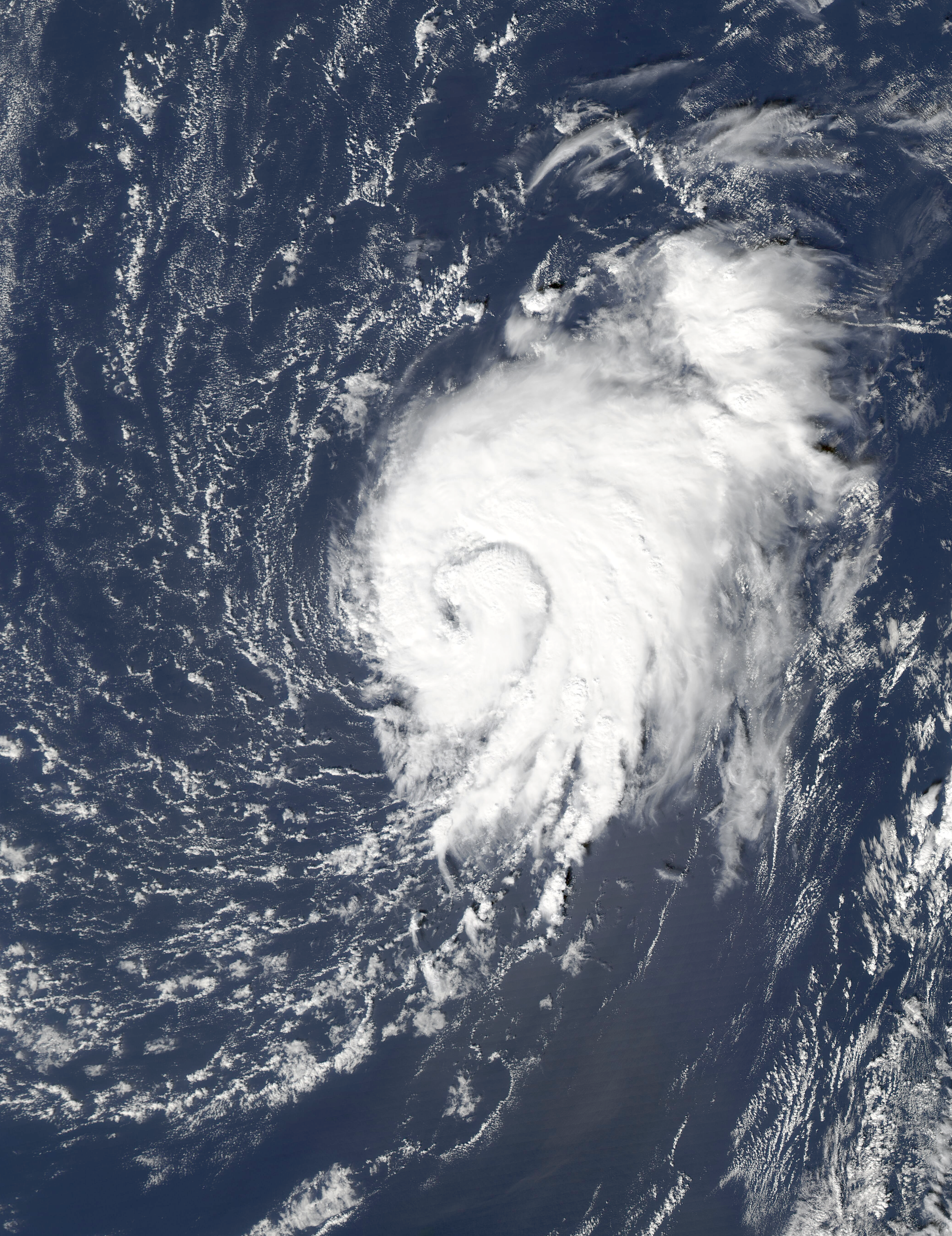
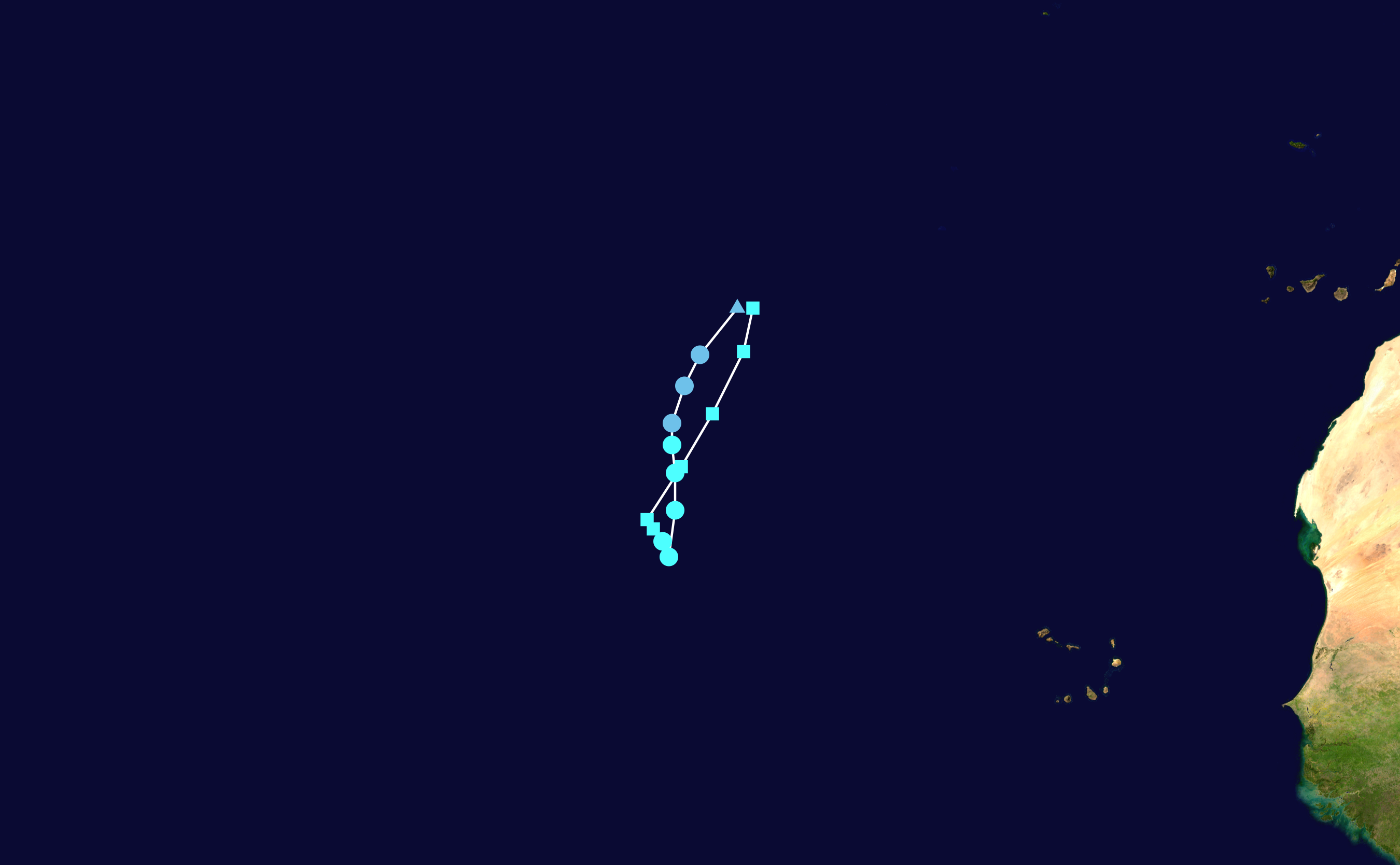
- Duration: December 7 – December 11
- Peak intensity: 70 mph (110 km/h) (1-min); 990 mbar (hPa)

On December 2, an extratropical cyclone developed in the eastern Atlantic. It moved southward, isolated from the westerlies. Convection developed near the center, and the system organized into a subtropical storm late on December 7, about 835 mi (1,345 km) south-southwest of the Azores. The system moved southwestward over warmer waters, and deep convection continued to organize over the center. Banding features also increased, and the National Hurricane Center declared the system as Tropical Storm Peter on December 9, about 980 mi (1,575 km) northwest of the Cape Verde islands. Initially, the National Hurricane Center did not anticipate strengthening; however, Peter intensified to winds of 70 mph (110 km/h) late on December 9, after an eye feature developed. It turned northward ahead of the same frontal system that absorbed Tropical Storm Odette, and the combination of strong upper-level winds and cooler water temperatures caused quick weakening. By December 10, Peter degenerated into a tropical depression, and after turning northeastward it was absorbed by the cold front the next day.

== Storm names ==
The following list of names was used for named storms that formed in the North Atlantic in 2003. This is the same list used for the 1997 season as no names were retired from that year. Storms were named Larry, Mindy, Nicholas, Odette, and Peter for the first time in 2003.

- Ana
- Bill
- Claudette
- Danny
- Erika
- Fabian
- Grace
- Henri
- Isabel
- Juan
- Kate
- Larry
- Mindy
- Nicholas
- Odette
- Peter
- Rose (unused)
- Sam (unused)
- Teresa (unused)
- Victor (unused)
- Wanda (unused)

=== Retirement ===
In the spring of 2004, The World Meteorological Organization retired Fabian, Isabel, and Juan from the Atlantic hurricane name lists. They were replaced with Fred, Ida, and Joaquin, respectively, for the 2009 season.

== Season effects ==
This is a table of all of the storms that formed in the 2003 Atlantic hurricane season. It includes their name, duration, peak classification and intensities, areas affected, damage, and death totals. Deaths in parentheses are additional and indirect (an example of an indirect death would be a traffic accident), but were still related to that storm. Damage and deaths include totals while the storm was extratropical, a wave, or a low, and all of the damage figures are in 2003 USD.

Saffir–Simpson scale
TD	TS	C1	C2	C3	C4	C5

2003 Atlantic hurricane season statistics
Storm name	Dates active	Storm category at peak intensity	Max 1-min wind mph (km/h)	Min. press. (mbar)	Areas affected	Damage (US$)	Deaths	Ref(s).
Ana	April 20 – 24	Tropical storm	60 (95)	994	Southeastern United States, Bermuda, Azores, British Isles	Minimal	2	
Two	June 11	Tropical depression	35 (55)	1008	None	None	None	
Bill	June 28 – July 2	Tropical storm	60 (95)	997	Gulf Coast of the United States, Southeastern United States	$50.5 million	4	
Claudette	July 8 – 17	Category 1 hurricane	90 (150)	979	Yucatán Peninsula, Texas, Windward Islands, Jamaica	$181 million	1 (2)	
Danny	July 16 – 21	Category 1 hurricane	75 (120)	1000	None	None	None	
Six	July 19 – 21	Tropical depression	35 (55)	1010	None	None	None	
Seven	July 25 – 27	Tropical depression	35 (55)	1016	Georgia	None	None	
Erika	August 14 – 17	Category 1 hurricane	75 (120)	988	Florida, Mexico, Southern Texas	>$10,000	2	
Nine	August 21 – 22	Tropical depression	35 (55)	1007	Lesser Antilles, Puerto Rico, Dominican Republic	$20,000	None	
Fabian	August 27 – September 8	Category 4 hurricane	145 (235)	939	Leeward Islands, Northern America, Eastern Canada	$300 million	9	
Grace	August 30 – September 2	Tropical storm	40 (65)	1007	Texas, Oklahoma, Ohio Valley, Mid-Atlantic States	>$113,000	None	
Henri	September 3 – 8	Tropical storm	60 (95)	997	Florida, Delaware, Pennsylvania	$19.6 million	None	
Isabel	September 6 – 19	Category 5 hurricane	165 (270)	915	Lesser Antilles, Greater Antilles, Lucayan Archipelago, East Coast of the United States, Atlantic Canada	$5.5 billion	16 (35)	
Fourteen	September 8 – 10	Tropical depression	35 (55)	1007	None	None	None	
Juan	September 24 – 29	Category 2 hurricane	105 (170)	969	Eastern Canada	$150 million	4 (4)	
Kate	September 25 – October 7	Category 3 hurricane	125 (205)	952	Newfoundland, Iceland, Europe	None	None	
Larry	October 1 – 6	Tropical storm	65 (100)	993	Central America	$53.6 million	6	
Mindy	October 10 – 14	Tropical storm	45 (75)	1002	Greater Antilles	$50,000	None	
Nicholas	October 13 – 23	Tropical storm	70 (110)	990	None	None	None	
Odette	December 4 – 7	Tropical storm	65 (100)	993	Greater Antilles	$8 million	8 (2)	
Peter	December 7 – 11	Tropical storm	70 (110)	990	None	None	None	
Season aggregates
21 systems	April 20 – December 11		165 (270)	915		$6.26 billion	52 (43)	

== See also ==
- Tropical cyclones in 2003
- 2003 Pacific hurricane season
- 2003 Pacific typhoon season
- 2003 North Indian Ocean cyclone season
- South-West Indian Ocean cyclone seasons: 2002–03, 2003–04
- Australian region cyclone seasons: 2002–03, 2003–04
- South Pacific cyclone seasons: 2002–03, 2003–04
