= Timeline of the 2003 Atlantic hurricane season =

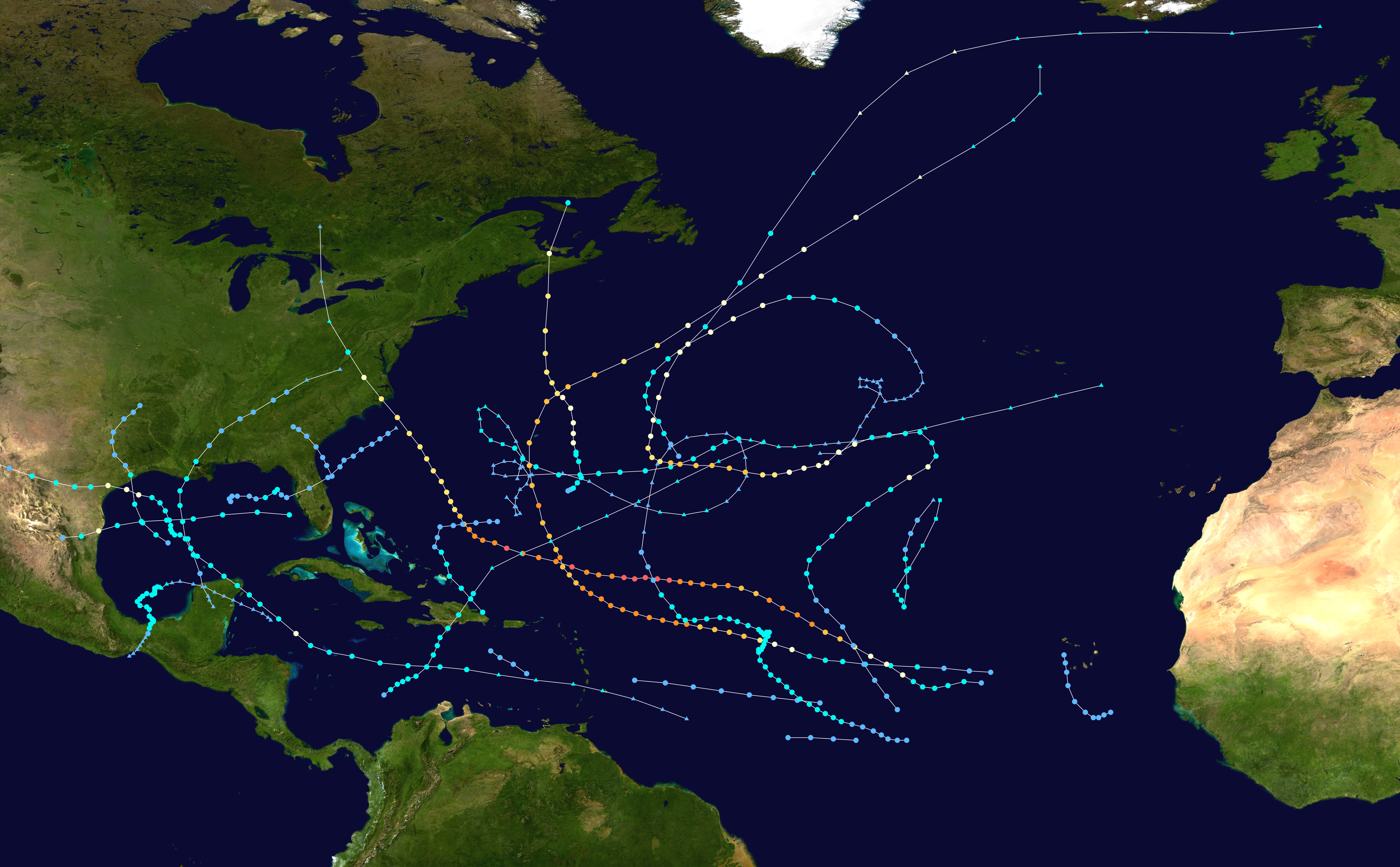
- Season summary map

Season boundaries
- First system formed: April 20, 2003
- Last system dissipated: December 11, 2003

Strongest system
- Name: Isabel
- Maximum winds: 165 mph (270 km/h) (1-minute sustained)
- Lowest pressure: 915 mbar (hPa; 27.02 inHg)

Longest lasting system
- Name: Isabel
- Duration: 13.5 days
Storm articles
- Tropical Storm Ana (2003)
- Tropical Storm Bill (2003)
- Hurricane Claudette (2003)
- Hurricane Erika (2003)
- Hurricane Fabian
- Tropical Storm Grace (2003)
- Tropical Storm Henri (2003)
- Hurricane Isabel
- Hurricane Juan
- Tropical Storm Larry (2003)
- Tropical Storm Odette (2003)

The 2003 Atlantic hurricane season was an active Atlantic hurricane season with tropical activity before and after the official bounds of the season – the first such occurrence in 33 years. The season officially began on June 1, 2003, and ended on November 30. However, a pre-season storm, Tropical Storm Ana, led to the season starting on April 20, and storm activity continued through December 11. This season had 21 tropical depressions, of which, 16 became named storms. Of these, 7 strengthened into hurricanes with 3 intensifying into major hurricanes. (Note: Hurricanes reaching Category 3 (wind speeds of 111 miles per hour (179 km/h)) or higher on the 5-level Saffir–Simpson wind speed scale are considered major hurricanes.) Hurricane Fabian, Hurricane Isabel, and Hurricane Juan had their names retired due to the impact caused in Bermuda, the eastern United States, and Nova Scotia respectively. Both Fabian and Juan were the worst hurricanes to hit their respective areas, causing $450 million in damages and 16 fatalities. Hurricane Isabel was the strongest, deadliest, and costliest storm of the season. Isabel peaked as a Category 5 hurricane over the open waters of the Atlantic; however, it weakened to a Category 2 before impacting the east coast of the United States, causing $3.6 billion in damages and 51 fatalities.

This timeline documents tropical cyclone formations, strengthening, weakening, landfalls, extratropical transitions, and dissipations during the season. It includes information that was not released throughout the season, meaning that data from post-storm reviews by the National Hurricane Center, such as a storm that was not initially warned upon, has been included.

The time stamp for each event is first stated using Coordinated Universal Time (UTC), the 24-hour clock where 00:00 = midnight UTC. The NHC uses both UTC and the time zone where the center of the tropical cyclone is currently located. The time zones utilized (east to west) prior to 2020 were: Atlantic, Eastern, and Central. In this timeline, the respective area time is included in parentheses. Additionally, figures for maximum sustained winds and position estimates are rounded to the nearest 5 units (miles, or kilometers), following National Hurricane Center practice. Direct wind observations are rounded to the nearest whole number. Atmospheric pressures are listed to the nearest millibar and nearest hundredth of an inch of mercury.

== Timeline ==
=== April ===
April 20

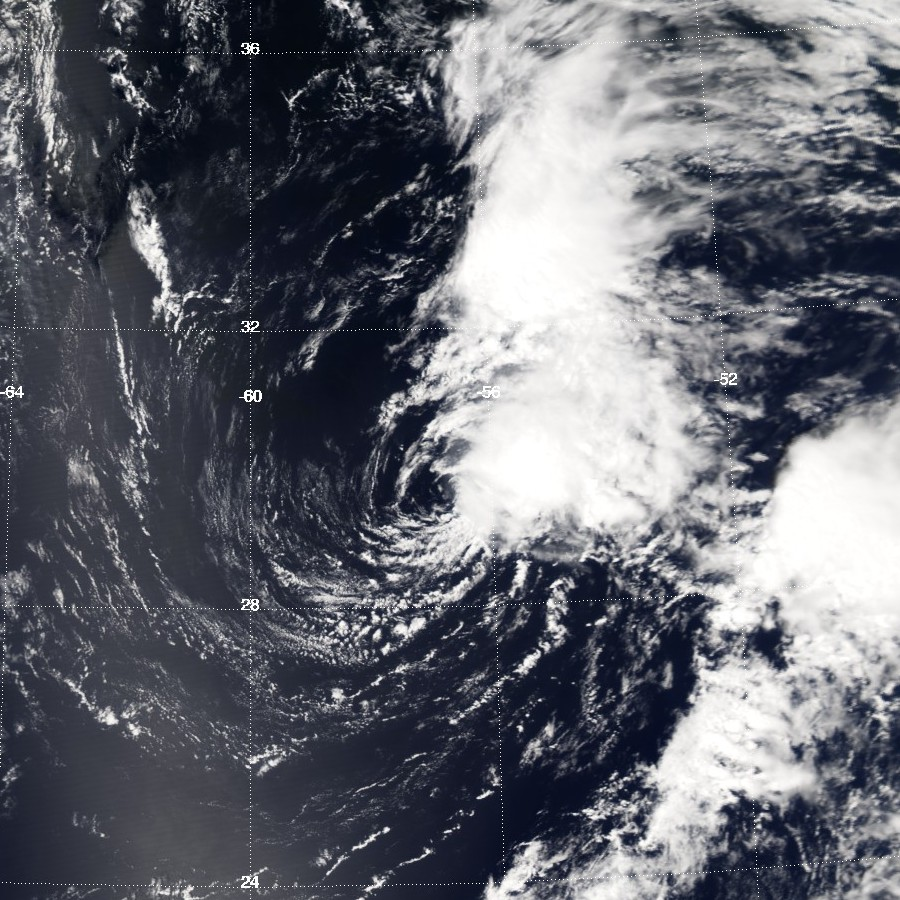
Tropical Storm Ana on April 22

- 2 a.m. EDT (0600 UTC) – Subtropical Storm Ana develops out of an extratropical low 250 miles (400 km) (Note: The figures for maximum sustained winds and position estimates are rounded to the nearest 5 units (knots, miles, or kilometers), following the convention used in the National Hurricane Center's operational products for each storm. All other units are rounded to the nearest digit.) west of Bermuda.
- 8 p.m. EDT (0000 UTC April 21) – Subtropical Storm Ana gains tropical characteristics and becomes Tropical Storm Ana.

April 24

- 2 a.m. EDT (0600 UTC) – Tropical Storm Ana loses tropical characteristics and becomes extratropical.

=== June ===
June 1

- The Atlantic hurricane season officially begins.

June 10

- 8 p.m. AST (0000 June 11) – Tropical Depression Two forms 1,145 mi (1,840 km) southwest of Brava, Cape Verde.

June 11

Tropical Storm Bill on July 1

- 8 p.m. AST (0000 June 12) – Tropical Depression Two dissipates over open waters.

June 29

- 1 a.m. CDT (0600 UTC) A Tropical Depression forms 210 mi west-northwest of Cancun, Mexico.
- 7 a.m. CDT (1200 UTC) – The Tropical Depression strengthens into Tropical Storm Bill.

June 30

- 2 p.m. CDT (1900 UTC) – Tropical Storm Bill makes landfall near Cocodrie, Louisiana with winds of 60 mph (95 km/h).

=== July ===
July 1

- 1 a.m. CDT (0600 UTC) – Tropical Storm Bill is downgraded to a tropical depression.

July 2

- 7 p.m. CDT (1800 UTC) – Tropical Depression Bill loses tropical characteristics and becomes extratropical.

July 8

- 8 p.m. AST (1800 UTC) – Tropical Storm Claudette develops out of a tropical wave located 150 mi (240 km) north of Aruba.

July 10

- 8 a.m. EDT (1200 UTC) – Tropical Storm Claudette intensifies into a hurricane in the western Caribbean Sea.
- 2 p.m. EDT (1800 UTC) – Hurricane Claudette weakens back to a tropical storm.

July 11

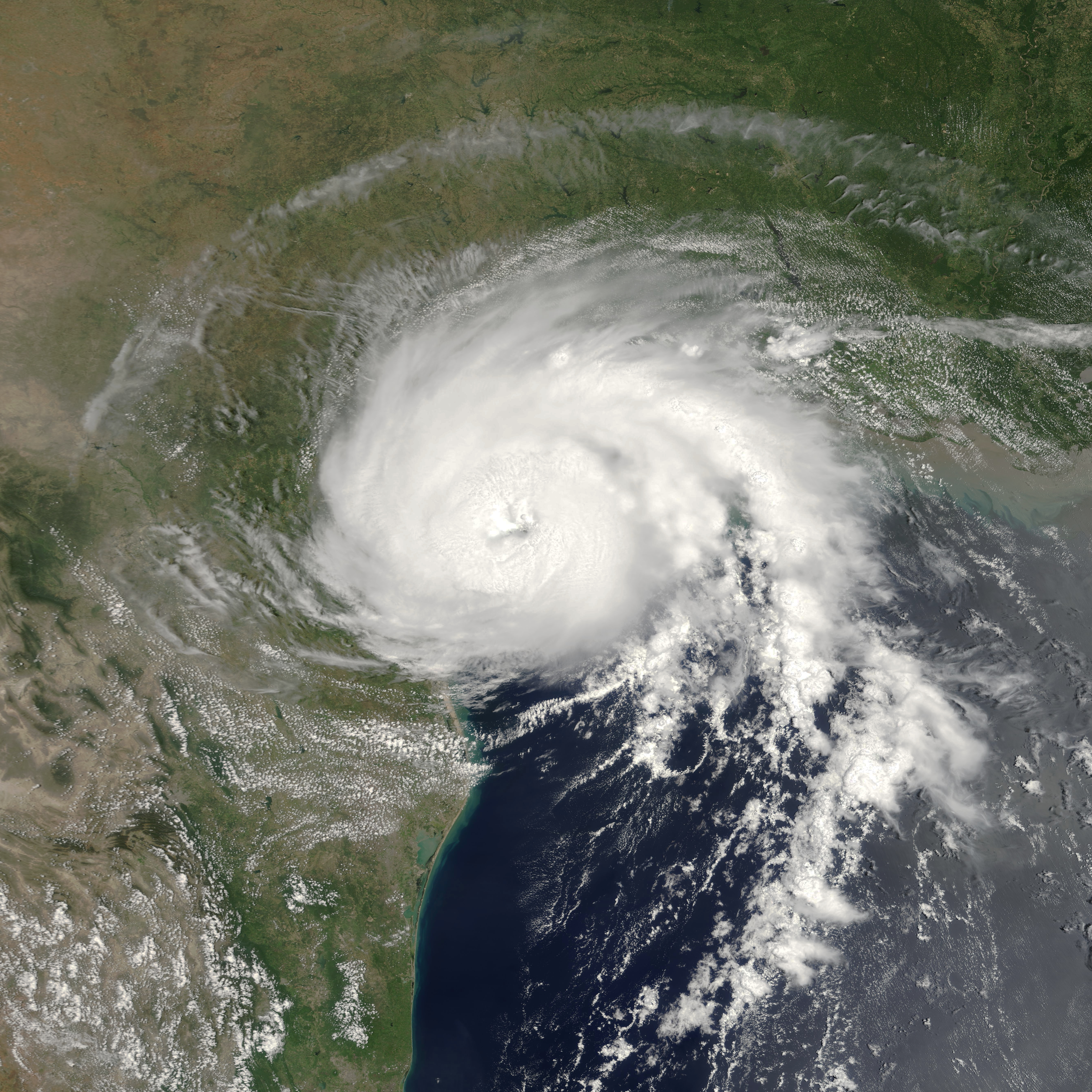
Hurricane Claudette at peak intensity

- 5 a.m. CDT (1000 UTC) – Tropical Storm Claudette makes landfall near Puerto Morelos, Mexico with winds of 60 mph (95 km/h).

July 15

- 1 a.m. CDT (0600 UTC) – Tropical Storm Claudette re-intensifies into a hurricane in the northwestern Gulf of Mexico.
- 10:30 a.m. CDT (1530 UTC) – Hurricane Claudette makes landfall near Matagorda Island, Texas with winds of 90 mph (145 km/h).
- 7 p.m. CDT (0000 UTC July 16 UTC) – Hurricane Claudette weakens to a tropical storm.

July 16

- 8 a.m. AST (1200 UTC) – Tropical Depression Four forms 635 mi (1,020 km) east of Bermuda.
- 7 p.m. CDT (0000 UTC July 17 UTC) – Tropical Storm Claudette weakens to a tropical depression.
- 8 p.m. AST (0000 UTC July 17 UTC) – Tropical Depression Four strengthens into Tropical Storm Danny.

July 17

- 1 a.m. CDT (0600 UTC) – Tropical Depression Claudette degenerates into a remnant low-pressure area.

July 18

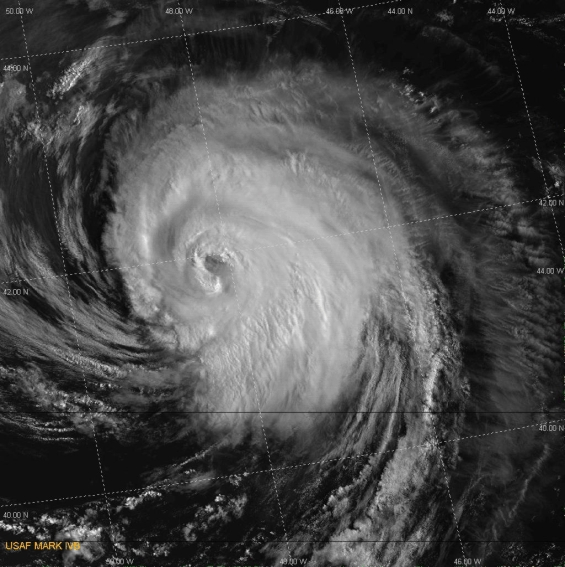
Hurricane Danny at peak intensity

- 2 p.m. AST (1800 UTC) – Tropical Storm Danny strengthens into a hurricane.

July 19

- 2 p.m. AST (1800 UTC) – Hurricane Danny weakens to a tropical storm.
- 2 p.m. AST (1800 UTC) – Tropical Depression Six forms 1035 mi (1675 km) east of the Lesser Antilles.

July 20

- 2 p.m. AST (1800 UTC) – Tropical Storm Danny weakens to a tropical depression.

July 21

- 2 a.m. AST (0600 UTC) – Tropical Depression Danny degenerates into a remnant low-pressure area.
- 2 p.m. AST (1800 UTC) – Tropical Depression Six dissipates over open waters.

July 25

- 8 p.m. EDT (1200 UTC) – Tropical Depression Seven forms 60 mi (95 km) east of Daytona Beach, Florida.

July 26

- 2 a.m. EDT (0600 UTC) – Tropical Depression Seven makes landfall near St. Catherines Island, Georgia with winds of 30 mph (45 km/h).

July 27

- 2 a.m. EDT (0600 UTC) – Tropical Depression Seven dissipates inland.

=== August ===
August 14

- 8 p.m. EDT (1800 UTC) – Tropical Storm Erika develops out of an area of low pressure about 85 mi (140 km) west-southwest of Fort Myers, Florida.

August 16

- 5:30 a.m. CDT (1030 UTC) – Tropical Storm Erika strengthens into a hurricane and makes landfall near Boca San Rafael in northeastern Tamaulipas with winds of 75 mph (120 km/h)
- 1 p.m. CDT (1800 UTC) – Hurricane Erika weakens to a tropical storm.
- 7 p.m. CDT (0000 UTC August 17) – Tropical Storm Erika weakens to a tropical depression.

August 17

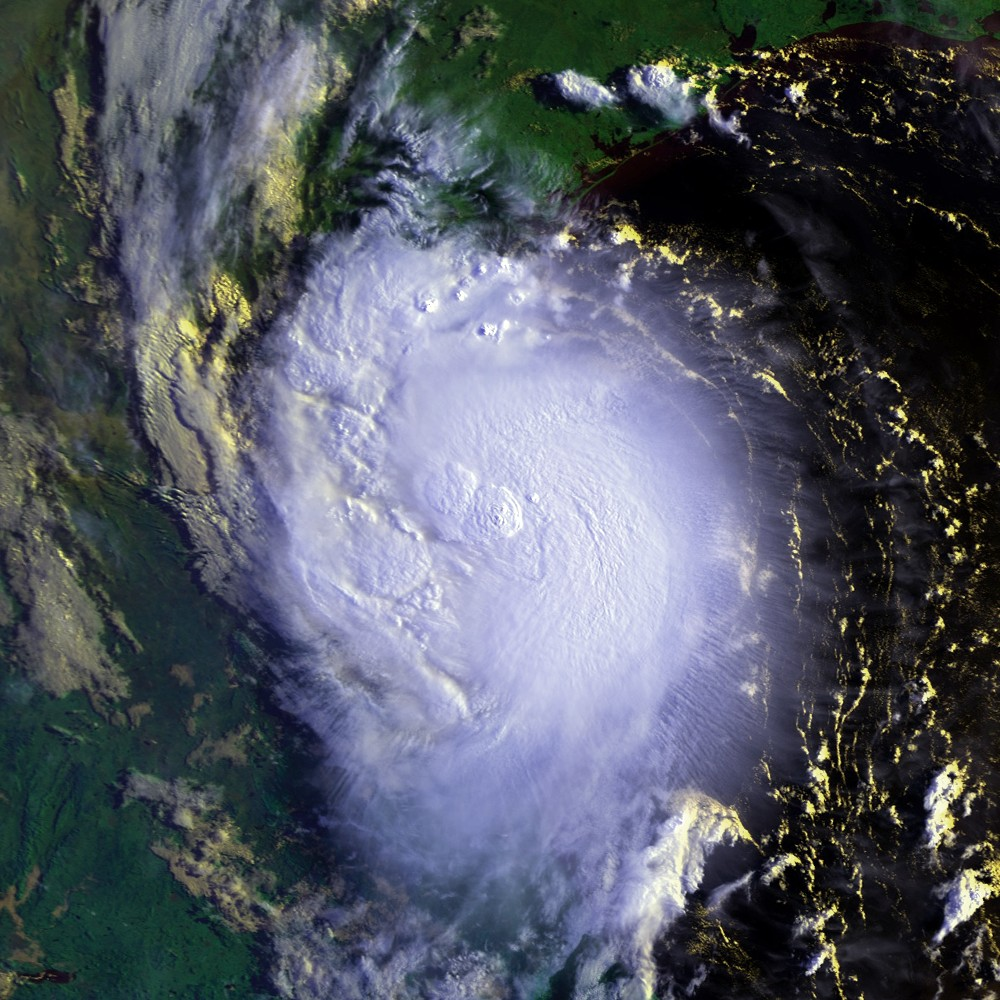
Hurricane Erika making landfall on the northern Mexican coastline

- 1 a.m. CDT (0600 UTC) – Tropical Depression Erika dissipates over the mountains of northern Mexico.

August 21

- 8 a.m. AST (1200 UTC) – Tropical Depression Nine forms about 260 mi (415 km) south of San Juan, Puerto Rico.

August 22

- 2 p.m. AST (1800 UTC) – Tropical Depression Nine dissipates over open waters.

August 27

- 2 p.m. AST (1800 UTC) – Tropical Depression Ten forms 420 mi (675 km) west of the Cape Verde Islands.

August 28

- 8 a.m. AST (1200 UTC) – Tropical Depression Ten strengthens into Tropical Storm Fabian.

August 29

- 8 p.m. AST (0000 UTC August 30) – Tropical Storm Fabian intensifies into a hurricane.

August 30

- 8 a.m. AST (1200 UTC) –Hurricane Fabian strengthens into a Category 2 hurricane.
- 7 a.m. CDT (1200 UTC) – Tropical Depression Eleven forms 335 mi (540 km) east-southeast of Corpus Christi, Texas.
- 2 p.m. AST (1800 UTC) – Hurricane Fabian strengthens into a major hurricane—a storm with winds of 111 mph (178 km/h) or higher.
- 1 p.m. CDT (1800 UTC) – Tropical Depression Eleven strengthens into Tropical Storm Grace.

August 31

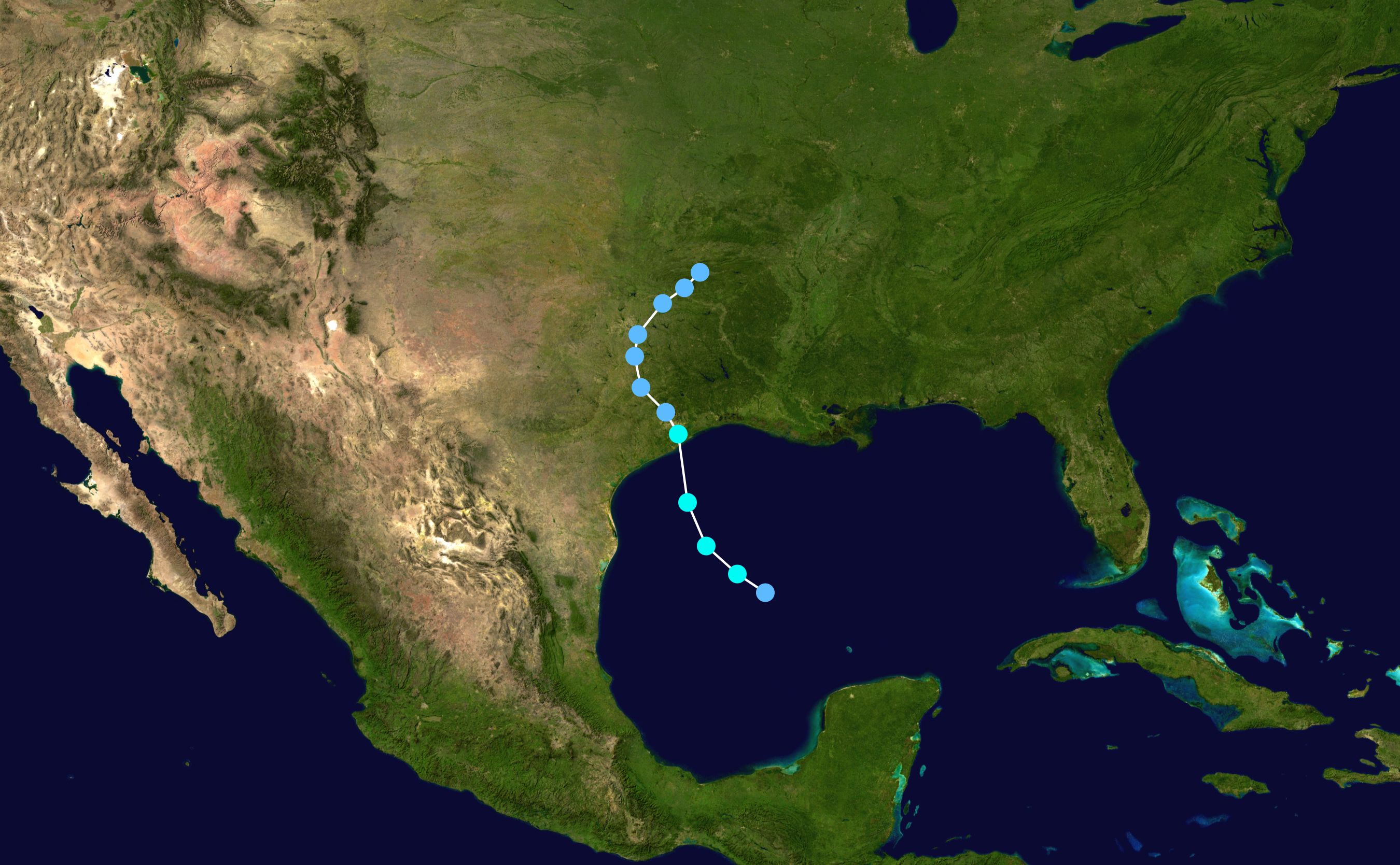
Storm track of Tropical Storm Grace

- 6 a.m. CDT (1100 UTC) – Tropical Storm Grace makes landfall near Galveston Island, Texas with winds of 40 mph (65 km/h).
- 2 p.m. AST (1800 UTC) – Hurricane Fabian strengthens into a Category 4 hurricane.
- 1 p.m. CDT (1800 UTC) – Tropical Storm Grace weakens to a tropical depression.

=== September ===
September 1

- 2 p.m. AST (1800 UTC) – Hurricane Fabian reaches its peak intensity with winds of 145 mph (230 km/h) while located 310 mi (500 km) northeast of Barbuda.

September 2

- 7 a.m. CDT (1200 UTC) – Tropical Depression Grace dissipates as it gets absorbed by a frontal system.

September 3

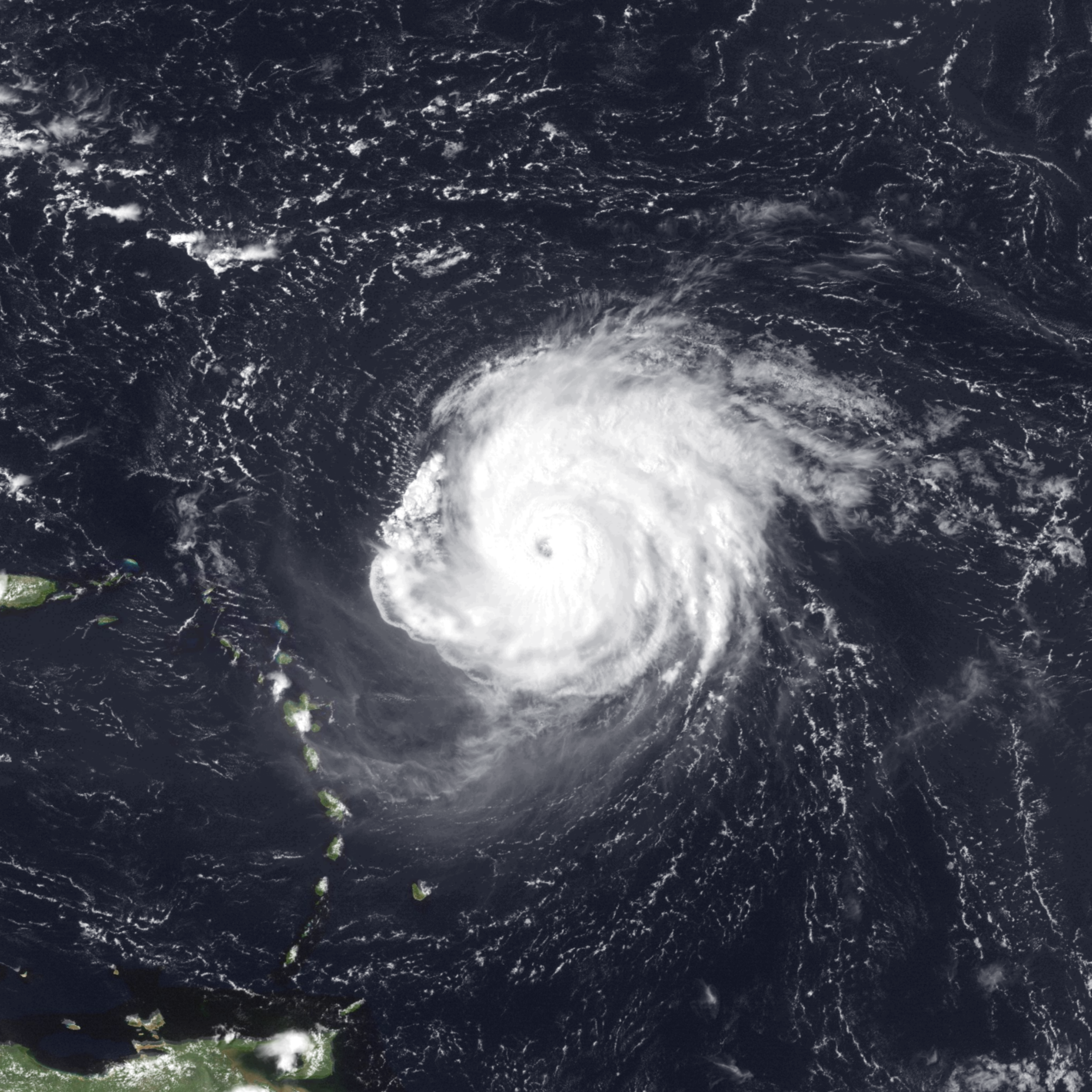
Hurricane Fabian at peak intensity

- 2 a.m. AST (0600 UTC) – Hurricane Fabian weakens to a Category 3 hurricane.
- 2 p.m. EDT (1800 UTC) – Tropical Depression Twelve forms 300 mi (480 km) west of Tampa, Florida.
- 8 p.m. AST (0000 UTC September 4) – Hurricane Fabian re-intensifies into a Category 4 hurricane.

September 4

- 2 a.m. AST (0600 UTC) – Hurricane Fabian weakens to a Category 3 hurricane again.
- 8 p.m. AST (0000 UTC September 5) – Hurricane Fabian re-intensifies into a Category 4 hurricane.

September 5

- 2 a.m. AST (0600 UTC) – Hurricane Fabian weakens to a Category 3 hurricane once more.
- 2 a.m. EDT (0600 UTC) – Tropical Depression Twelve strengthens into Tropical Storm Henri.
- 4 p.m. AST (2000 UTC) – Hurricane Fabian makes its closest approach to land, passing 14 mi (23 km) to the west of Bermuda with winds of 120 mph (180 km/h).
- 8 p.m. EDT (0000 UTC September 6) – Tropical Storm Henri weakens to a tropical depression.
- 8 p.m. AST (0000 UTC September 6) – Tropical Depression Thirteen forms 470 mi (755 km) west-southwest of Brava, Cape Verde.

September 6

- 2 a.m. AST (0600 UTC) – Tropical Depression Thirteen strengthens into Tropical Storm Isabel.
- 5 a.m. EDT (0900 UTC) – Tropical Depression Henri makes landfall near Clearwater, Florida with winds of 35 mph (55 km/h).
- 8 p.m. AST (0000 UTC September 7) – Hurricane Fabian weakens into a Category 2 hurricane.

September 7

- 8 a.m. AST (1200 UTC) – Hurricane Fabian weakens to a Category 1 hurricane.
- 8 a.m. AST (1200 UTC) – Tropical Storm Isabel strengthens into a hurricane.

September 8

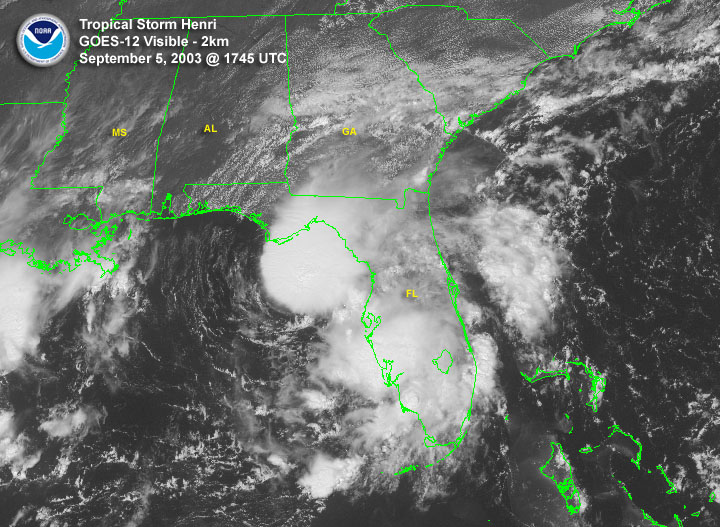
Tropical Storm Henri at peak intensity

- 2 a.m. AST (0600 UTC) – Hurricane Isabel strengthens into a Category 2 hurricane.
- 2 a.m. AST (0600 UTC) – Tropical Depression Fourteen forms 290 mi (465 km) southeast of the southernmost Cape Verde islands.
- 8 a.m. AST (1200 UTC) – Hurricane Isabel strengthens into a major hurricane.
- 2 p.m. AST (1800 UTC) – Hurricane Fabian loses tropical characteristics and becomes extratropical, while retaining hurricane-force winds, over the open waters of the north Atlantic Ocean.
- 2 p.m. EDT (1800 UTC) – Tropical Depression Henri loses tropical characteristics and becomes extratropical shortly before dissipating.
- 8 p.m. AST (0000 UTC September 9) – Hurricane Isabel strengthens into a Category 4 hurricane.

September 9

- 8 p.m. AST (0000 UTC September 10) – Hurricane Isabel weakens to a Category 3 hurricane.

September 10

- 8 a.m. AST (1200 UTC) – Hurricane Isabel re-intensifies into a Category 4 hurricane.
- 2 p.m. AST (1800 UTC) – Tropical Depression Fourteen dissipates.

September 11

- 2 p.m. AST (1800 UTC) – Hurricane Isabel strengthens into a Category 5 hurricane, becoming the strongest storm of the season; winds peak at 165 mph (270 km/h) and the minimum pressure is 915 mbar (hPa; (27.03 inHg). At this time, Isabel is located 560 mi (900 km) northeast of Guadeloupe.

September 12

Hurricane Isabel making landfall on the North Carolina Coastline

- 8 p.m. AST (0000 UTC September 13) – Hurricane Isabel weakens to a Category 4 hurricane.

September 13

- 2 p.m. AST (1800 UTC) – Hurricane Isabel re-intensifies into a Category 5 hurricane.
- 8 p.m. AST (0000 UTC September 14) – Hurricane Isabel weakens to a Category 4 hurricane again.

September 14

- 2 p.m. AST (1800 UTC) – Hurricane Isabel re-intensifies into a Category 5 hurricane for the third and final time.
- 8 p.m. AST (0000 UTC September 15) – Hurricane Isabel weakens to a Category 4 hurricane once more.

September 15

- 8 p.m. EST (0000 UTC September 16) – Hurricane Isabel weakens to a Category 3 hurricane.

September 16

- 8 a.m. (1200 UTC) – Hurricane Isabel weakens to a Category 2 hurricane.

September 18

- 1 p.m. EST (1700 UTC) – Hurricane Isabel makes landfall near Drum Inlet, North Carolina with winds of 105 mph (165 km/h).
- 8 p.m. EST (0000 UTC September 19) – Hurricane Isabel weakens to a Category 1 hurricane.

September 19

- 2 a.m. EST (0600 UTC) – Hurricane Isabel weakens to a tropical storm.
- 8 a.m. EST (1200 UTC) – Tropical Storm Isabel loses tropical characteristics and becomes extratropical.

September 24

- 8 a.m. AST (1200 UTC) – Tropical Depression Fifteen forms 345 mi (555 km) southeast of Bermuda.
- 8 p.m. AST (0000 UTC September 25) – Tropical Depression Fifteen strengthens into Tropical Storm Juan.

September 25

- 2 p.m AST (1800 UTC) – Tropical Depression Sixteen forms 920 mi (1,480 km) west-southwest of the Cape Verde Islands.

September 26

- 8 a.m. AST (1200 UTC) – Tropical Storm Juan strengthens into a hurricane.

September 27

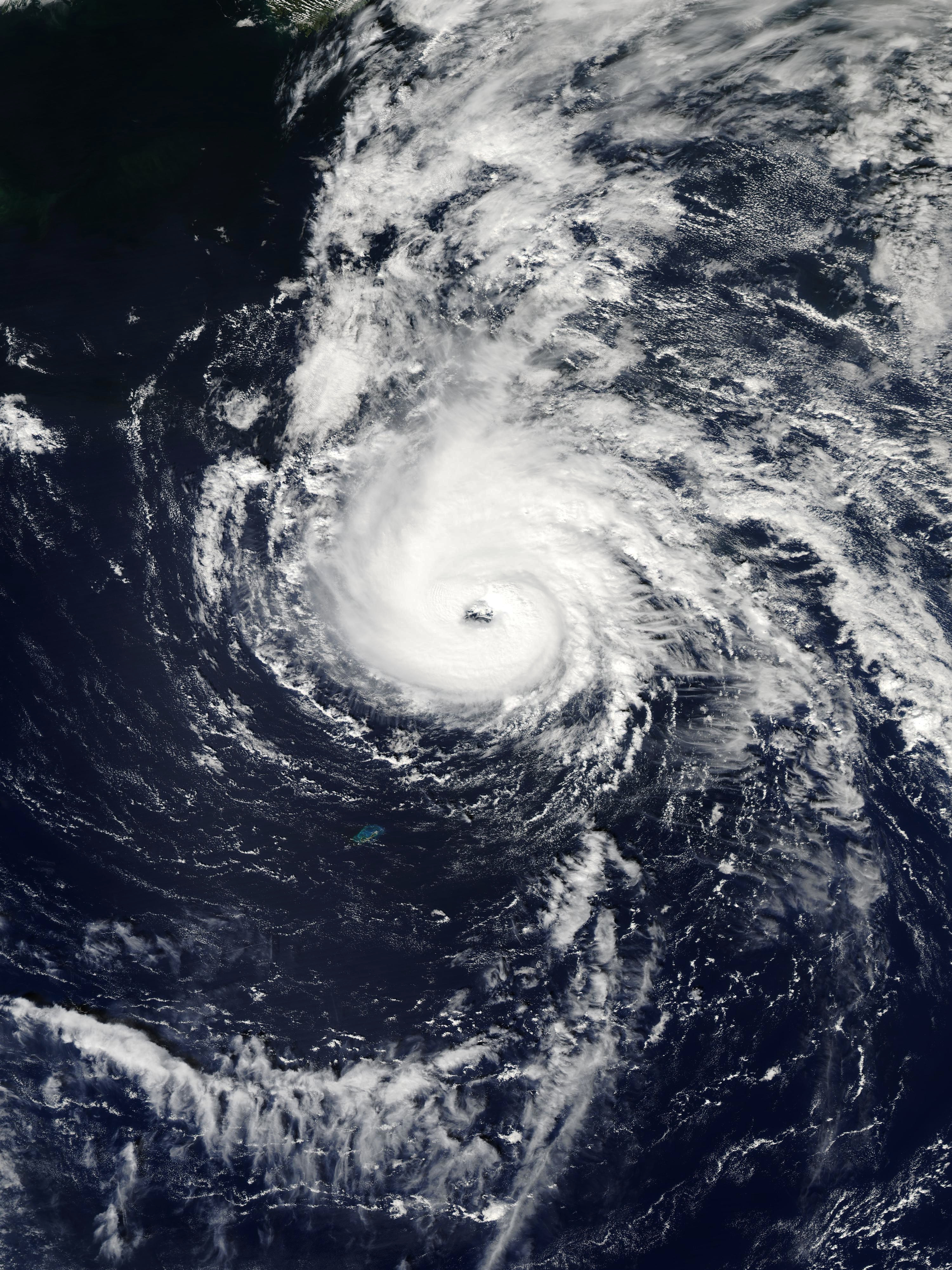
Hurricane Juan on September 27

- 2 p.m. AST (1800 UTC) – Hurricane Juan strengthens into a Category 2 hurricane.
- 2 p.m. AST (1800 UTC) – Tropical Depression Sixteen strengthens into Tropical Storm Kate.

September 28

- 11 p.m. AST (0300 UTC September 29) – Hurricane Juan makes landfall near Halifax, Nova Scotia with winds of 100 mph (160 km/h).

September 29

- 2 a.m. AST (0600 UTC) – Hurricane Juan weakens to a Category 1 hurricane as it passes over Prince Edward Island with winds of 75 mph (120 km/h).
- 8 a.m. AST (1200 UTC) – Hurricane Juan weakens to a tropical storm.
- 2 p.m. AST (1800 UTC) – Tropical Storm Juan is absorbed by a large extratropical low.
- 2 p.m. AST (1800 UTC) – Tropical Storm Kate strengthens into a hurricane.

September 30

- 2 a.m. AST (0600 UTC) – Hurricane Kate weakens to a tropical storm.

=== October ===
October 1

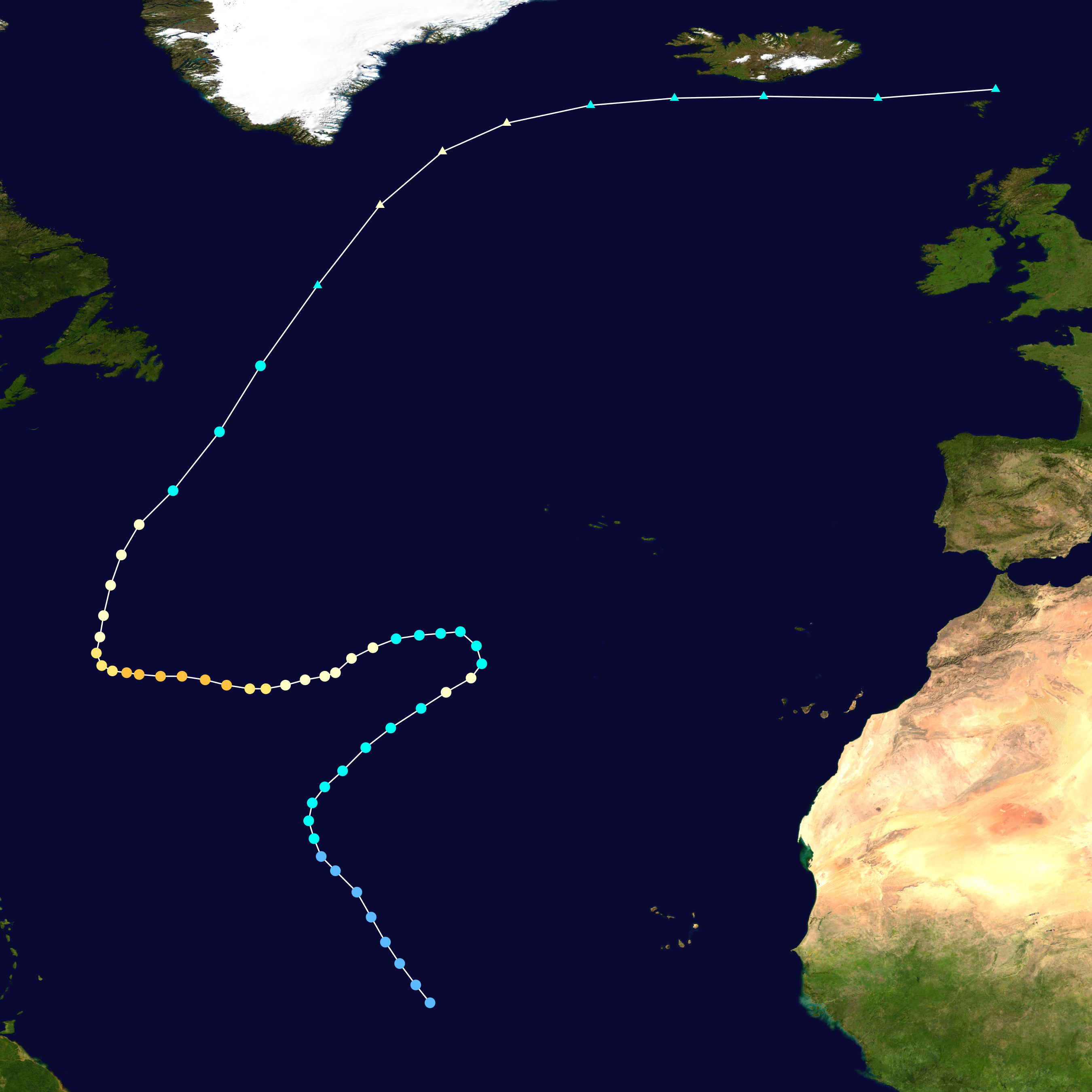
Storm track of Hurricane Kate

- 2 p.m. AST (1800 UTC) – Tropical Storm Kate re-intensifies into a hurricane.
- 1 p.m. CDT (1800 UTC) – Tropical Storm Larry develops out of an extratropical gale while located 300 mi (483 km) east-southeast of Tampico, Mexico.

October 3

- 2 a.m. AST (0600 UTC) – Hurricane Kate strengthens into a Category 2 hurricane.
- 2 p.m. AST (1800 UTC) – Hurricane Kate strengthens into a major hurricane.

October 4

- 2 p.m. AST (1800 UTC) – Hurricane Kate reaches its peak intensity with winds of 125 mph (205 km/h) with a minimum pressure of 952 mbar (hPa; 28.12 inHg) while located 645 mi (1,040 km) southeast of Bermuda.

October 5

- 2 a.m. AST (0600 UTC) – Hurricane Kate weakens to a Category 2 hurricane.
- 5 a.m. CDT (1000 UTC) – Tropical Storm Larry makes landfall near Paraíso in the Mexican state of Tabasco with winds of 60 mph (95 km/h).
- 8 p.m. AST (0000 UTC October 6) – Hurricane Kate weakens to a Category 1 hurricane.

October 6

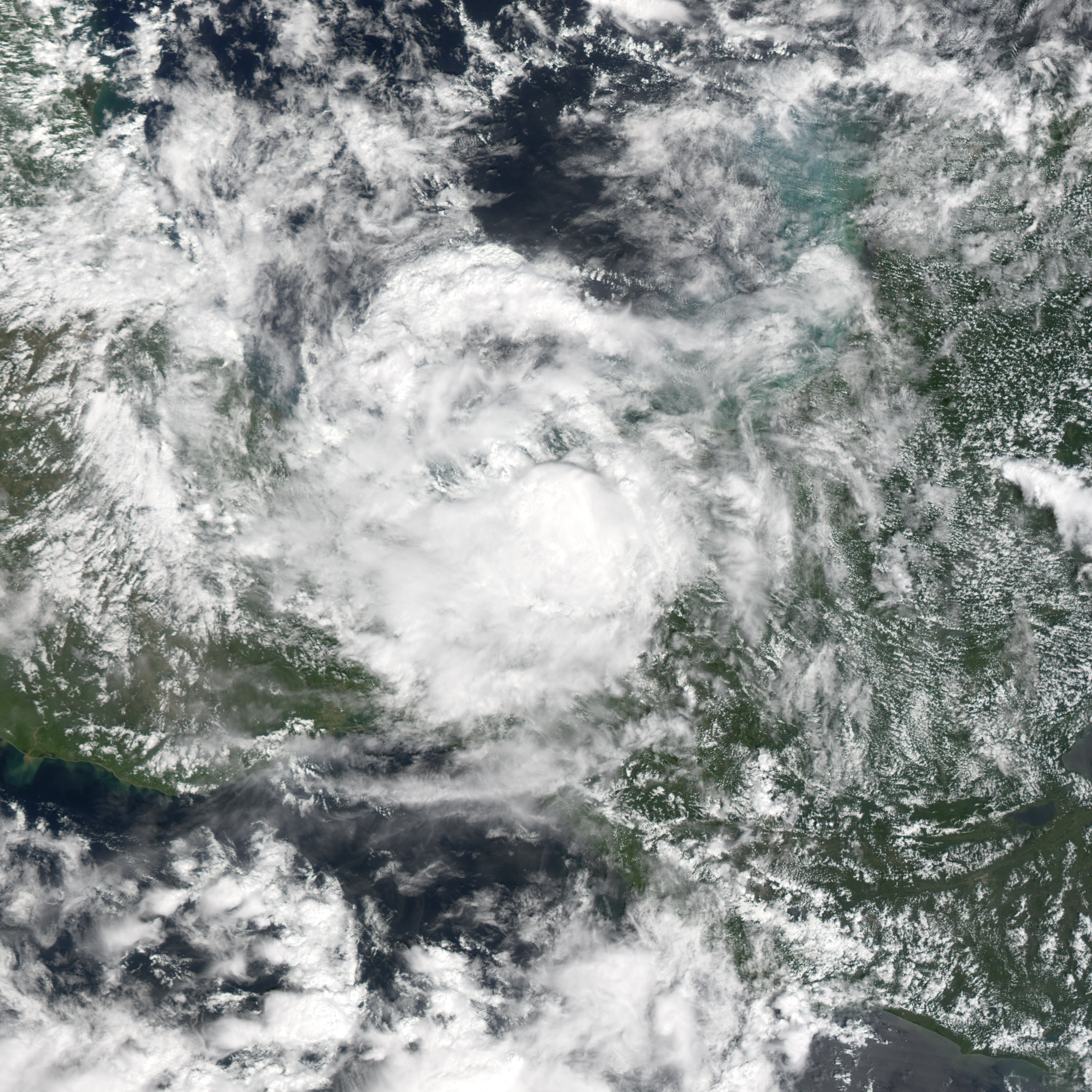
Tropical Storm Larry near landfall

- 1 a.m. CDT (0600 UTC) – Tropical Storm Larry weakens to a tropical depression.
- 7 a.m. CDT (1200 UTC) – Tropical Depression Larry degenerates into a remnant low-pressure area.

October 7

- 2 a.m. AST (0600 UTC) – Hurricane Kate weakens to a tropical storm.
- 8 p.m. AST (0000 UTC October 8) – Tropical Storm Kate loses tropical characteristics and becomes extratropical over the northern Atlantic Ocean while located several hundred miles northeast of Newfoundland.

October 10

- 2 p.m. AST (1800 UTC) – Tropical Storm Mindy forms 80 mi (130 km) northeast of Santo Domingo, Dominican Republic.

October 12

- 2 a.m. AST (0600 UTC) – Tropical Storm Mindy weakens to a tropical depression.
- 8 p.m. AST (0000 UTC October 13) – Tropical Depression Nineteen forms 1,030 mi (1,660 km) west-southwest of the Cape Verde islands.

October 14

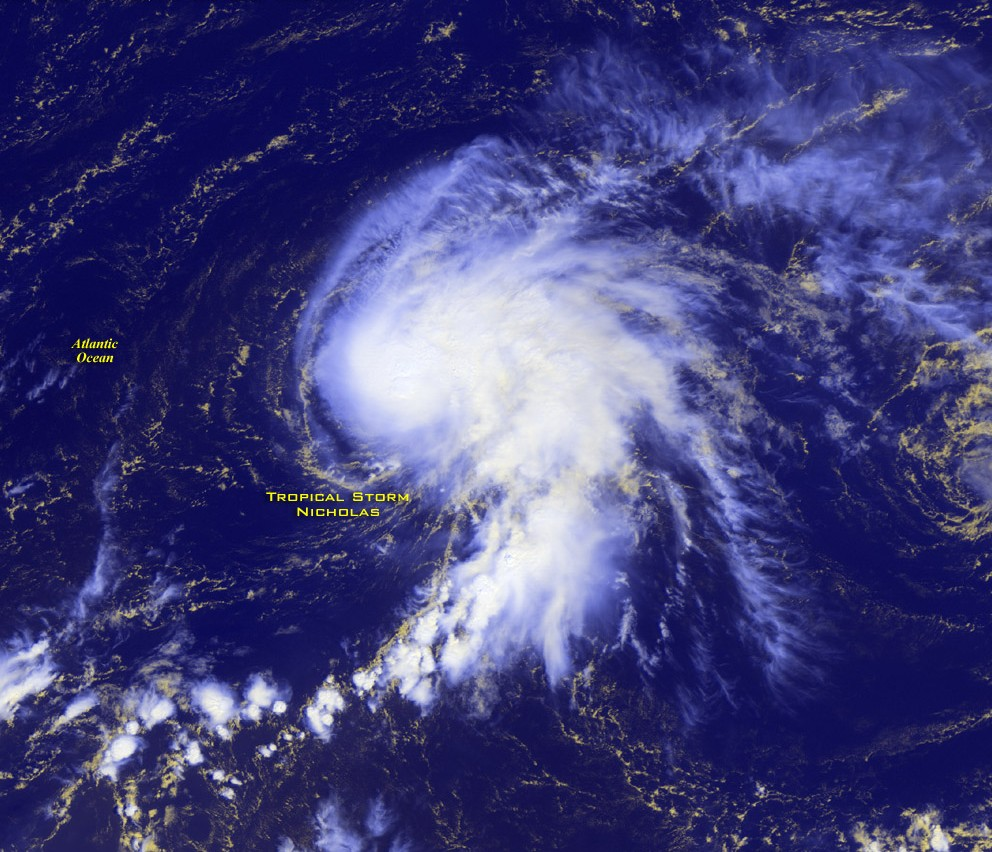
Tropical Storm Nicholas at peak intensity

- 2 a.m. AST (0600 UTC) – Tropical Depression Mindy dissipates.
- 2 p.m. AST (1800 UTC) – Tropical Depression Nineteen strengthens into Tropical Storm Nicholas.

October 22

- 8 p.m. AST (0000 UTC October 23) – Tropical Storm Nicholas weakens to a tropical depression.

October 23

- 8 p.m. AST (0000 UTC October 24) – Tropical Depression Nicholas degenerates into a broad area of low pressure while located 605 mi (975 km) northeast of Barbuda.

=== November ===
November 30

- The Atlantic hurricane season officially ends.

=== December ===
December 4

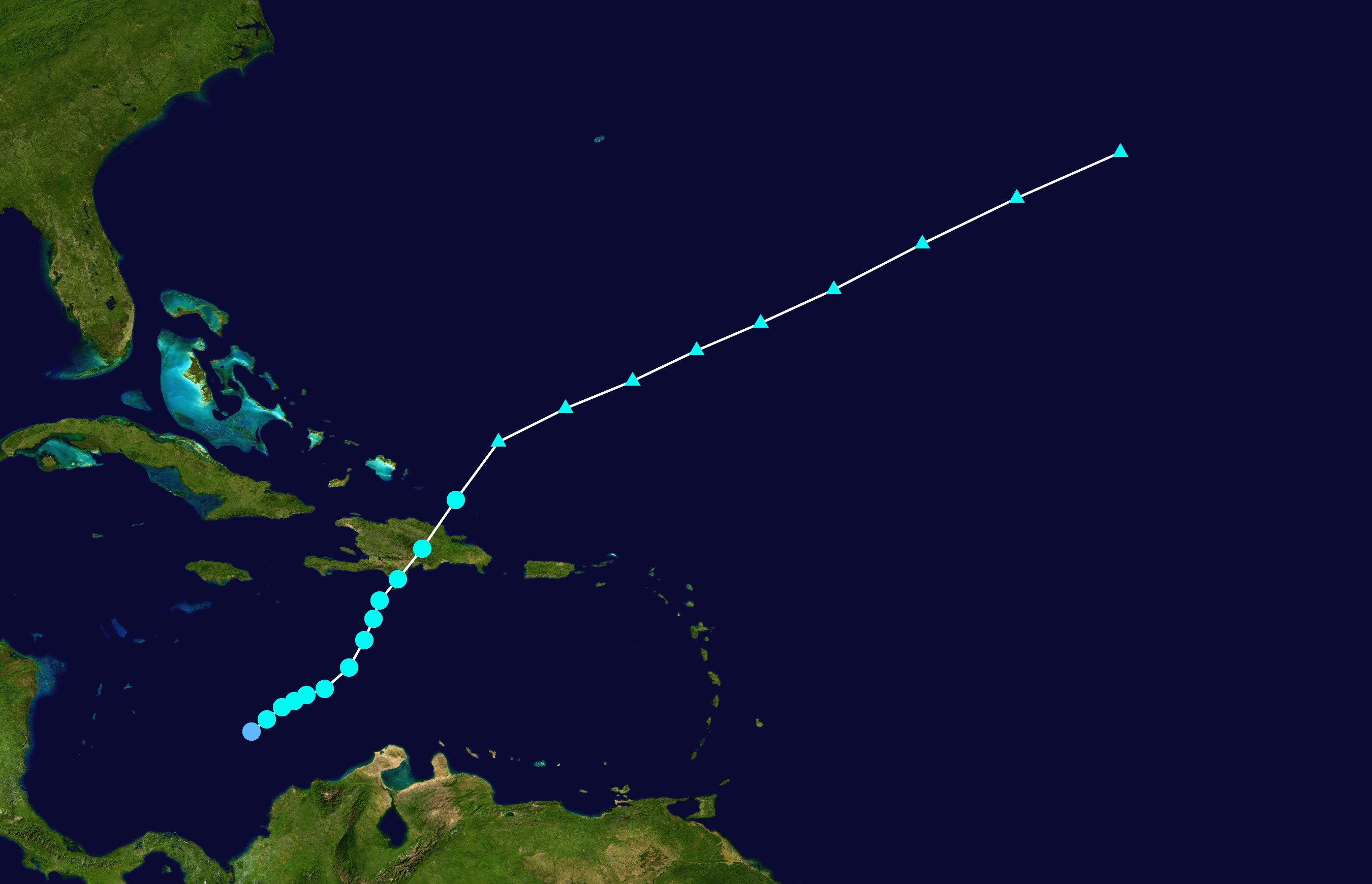
Storm track of Tropical Storm Odette

- 8 a.m. AST (1200 UTC) – Tropical Depression Twenty forms about 345 mi (560 km) south of Kingston, Jamaica.
- 2 p.m. AST (1800 UTC) – Tropical Depression Twenty strengthens into Tropical Storm Odette.

December 6

- 7 p.m. AST (2300 UTC) – Tropical Storm Odette makes landfall near Cabo Falso, Dominican Republic with winds of 60 mph (95 km/h).

December 7

- 2 p.m. AST (1800 UTC) – Tropical Storm Odette loses tropical characteristics and becomes extratropical.
- 2 p.m. AST (1800 UTC) – Subtropical Storm Peter forms 835 mi (1,340 km) south-southwest of the Azores.

December 9

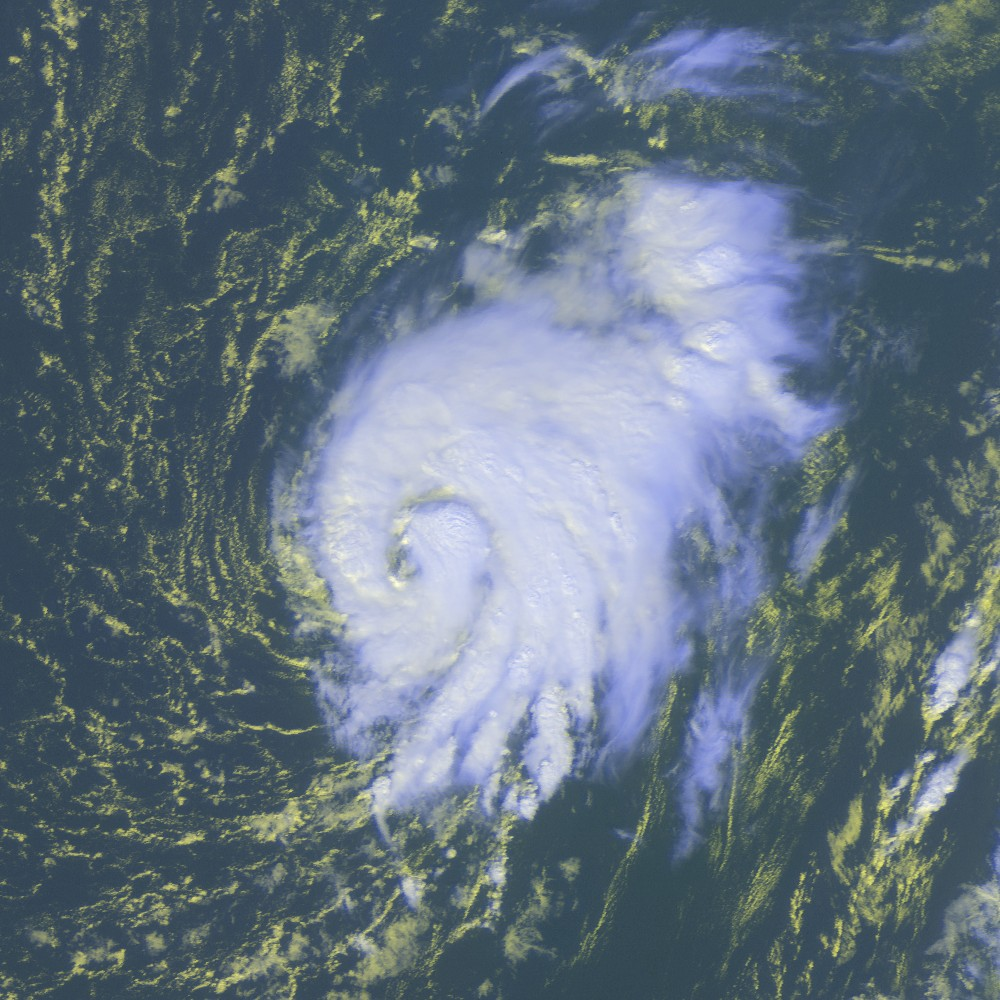
Tropical Storm Peter at peak intensity

- 2 a.m. AST (0600 UTC) – Subtropical Storm Peter acquires enough tropical characteristics to be classified a tropical storm.

December 10

- 8 a.m. AST (1200 UTC) – Tropical Storm Peter weakens to a tropical depression.

December 11

- 2 a.m. AST (0600 UTC) – Tropical Depression Peter loses tropical characteristics and becomes extratropical shortly before being absorbed by a frontal system.
