= Tropical Storm Henri (2003) =

Atlantic tropical cyclone

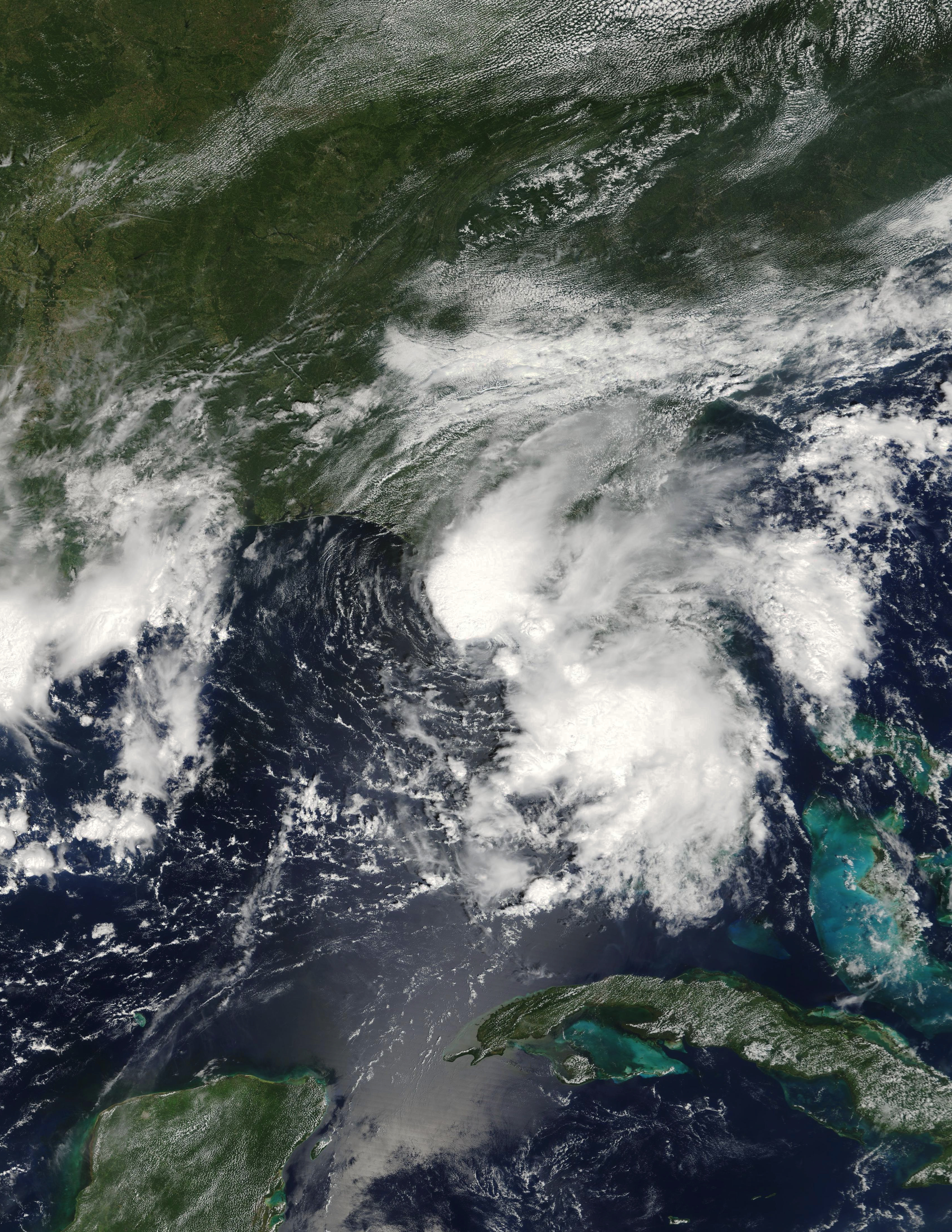
- Tropical Storm Henri near peak intensity on September 5

Meteorological history
- Formed: September 3, 2003
- Dissipated: September 8, 2003

Tropical storm
- 1-minute sustained (SSHWS/NWS)
- Highest winds: 60 mph (95 km/h)
- Lowest pressure: 997 mbar (hPa); 29.44 inHg

Overall effects
- Fatalities: None reported
- Damage: $19.6 million (2003 USD)
- Areas affected: East Coast of the United States
- IBTrACS
- Part of the 2003 Atlantic hurricane season

Tropical Storm Henri was a moderate tropical storm that struck Florida during the 2003 Atlantic hurricane season. The eighth storm of the season, Henri was one of six tropical cyclones to hit the United States in the year. Henri formed from a tropical wave in the Gulf of Mexico on September 3. Moving generally to the east, it strengthened to reach peak winds of 60 mph (97 km/h) two days later. Henri encountered unfavorable conditions, and it weakened before making landfall on western Florida near Clearwater as a tropical depression. Crossing Florida, Henri degenerated into a remnant low on September 8, but the weather system persisted off the east coast of the United States for a few days before moving back ashore over North Carolina. The system brought heavy rainfall across parts of the Mid-Atlantic before dissipating on September 17.

Henri caused little damage as a tropical cyclone. In Florida, it dropped heavy rainfall, though damage was limited to minor flooding damage. In Delaware and Pennsylvania, damage was greater, where heavy rainfall damaged hundreds of houses and businesses. The resulting floods in Delaware were described by some people as a 1 in 500 year event. The total damage by Henri along its path amounted to $19.6 million (2003 USD), but no deaths were reported.

== Meteorological history ==
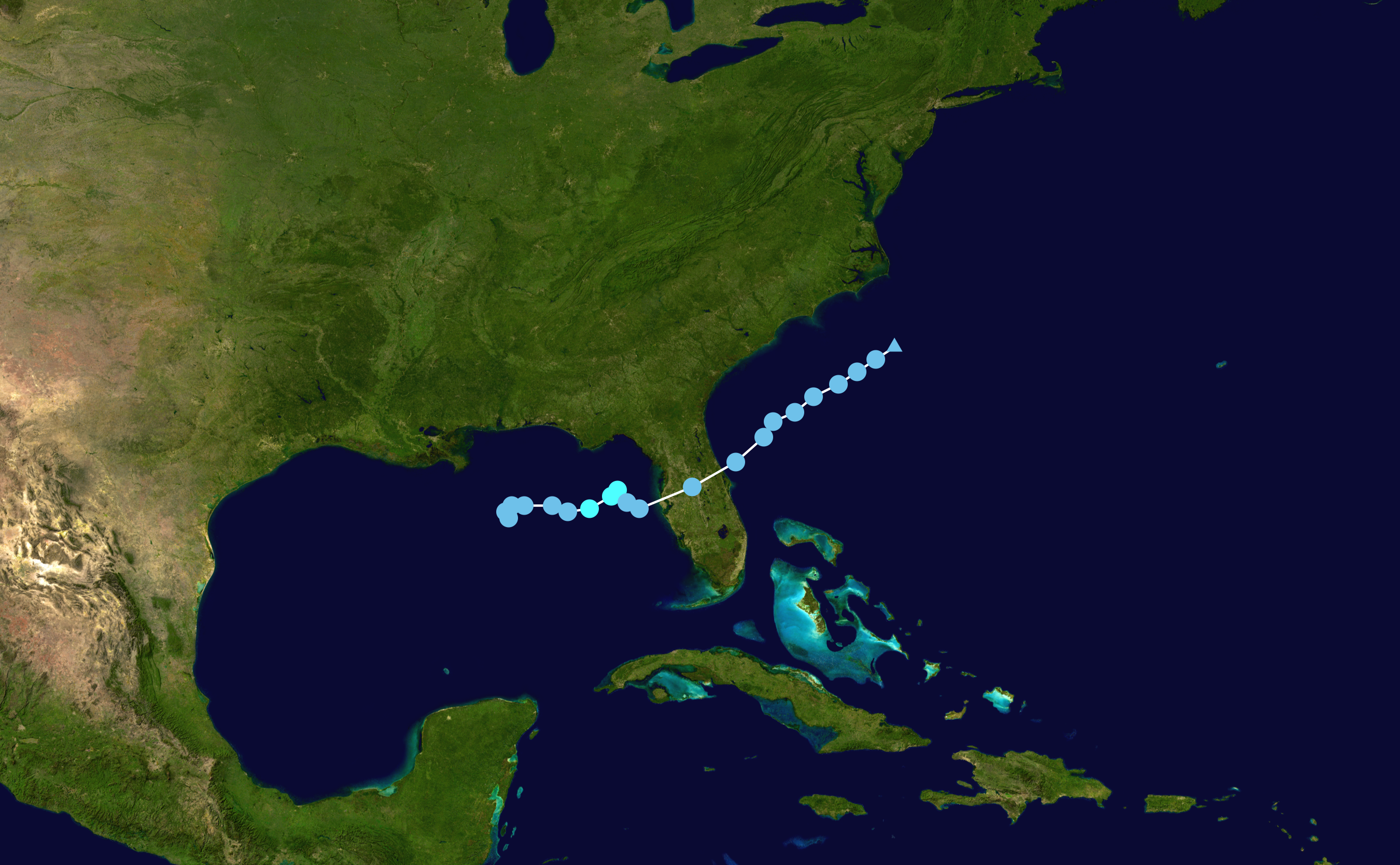
Map plotting the storm's track and intensity, according to the Saffir–Simpson scale Map key Saffir–Simpson scale Tropical depression (≤38 mph, ≤62 km/h) Tropical storm (39–73 mph, 63–118 km/h) Category 1 (74–95 mph, 119–153 km/h) Category 2 (96–110 mph, 154–177 km/h) Category 3 (111–129 mph, 178–208 km/h) Category 4 (130–156 mph, 209–251 km/h) Category 5 (≥157 mph, ≥252 km/h) Unknown Storm type Tropical cyclone Subtropical cyclone Extratropical cyclone, remnant low, tropical disturbance, or monsoon depression

On August 22, a tropical wave moved off the coast of Africa, and it moved westward across the Atlantic Ocean and Caribbean Sea without developing significantly. On September 1 the wave axis entered the Gulf of Mexico, and upon doing so convection steadily organized around a low-level center of circulation. The system moved northward and developed into Tropical Depression Twelve on September 3 while located about 300 miles (480 kilometers) west of Tampa, Florida. Embedded within a slow mid-latitude trough, the depression moved eastward and strengthened into Tropical Storm Henri on September 5.

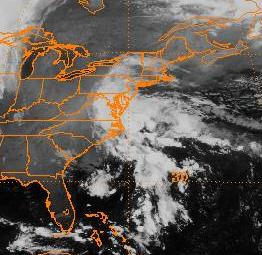
Remnants of Henri near North Carolina on September 12

Despite strong southwesterly vertical shear, Henri continued intensifying while moving eastward, and reached a peak strength of 60 mph (97 km/h) later on September 5. Shortly thereafter, though, the shear greatly weakened the storm, and it was downgraded to a tropical depression. Henri was not able to recover its intensity, and made landfall near Clearwater, Florida on September 6 as a 35 mph (56 km/h) tropical depression, and quickly crossed the state as it accelerated to the northeast. Despite initial predictions of re-intensification over open waters due to potentially lower shear, Henri failed to re-strengthen and degenerated into a remnant low pressure area on September 8 off the coast of North Carolina.

The broad and disorganized remnant low remained nearly stationary due to a ridge of high pressure to its north. Residual convection within the remnants of Henri remained disorganized, but forecasters kept watch for the potential for redevelopment. However, it moved inland near Cape Hatteras on September 12 without reorganizing. The remnants continued to the north and dissipated on September 17 over New England.

== Preparations ==
The National Hurricane Center issued a Tropical Storm Warning from Englewood to Indian Pass, Florida while Henri was a tropical depression; however, warnings were discontinued by the time Henri made landfall. Flood warnings were issued across the state prior to the storm making landfall, with predictions of 5 to 10 inches (127 to 254 millimetres) of rainfall. As a result of the storm's approach, twelve shelters were placed on standby. Similarly, the Hurricane Shelter Information Hotline was placed on standby and ready to be activated within 10 minutes. Levy County officials declared a state of emergency. There, sandbags and sand were sent to Cedar Key, Yankeetown, and Inglis in anticipation for storm surge and flooding. Schools in three western Florida counties canceled events for the evening of September 5 due to the storm.

== Impact ==
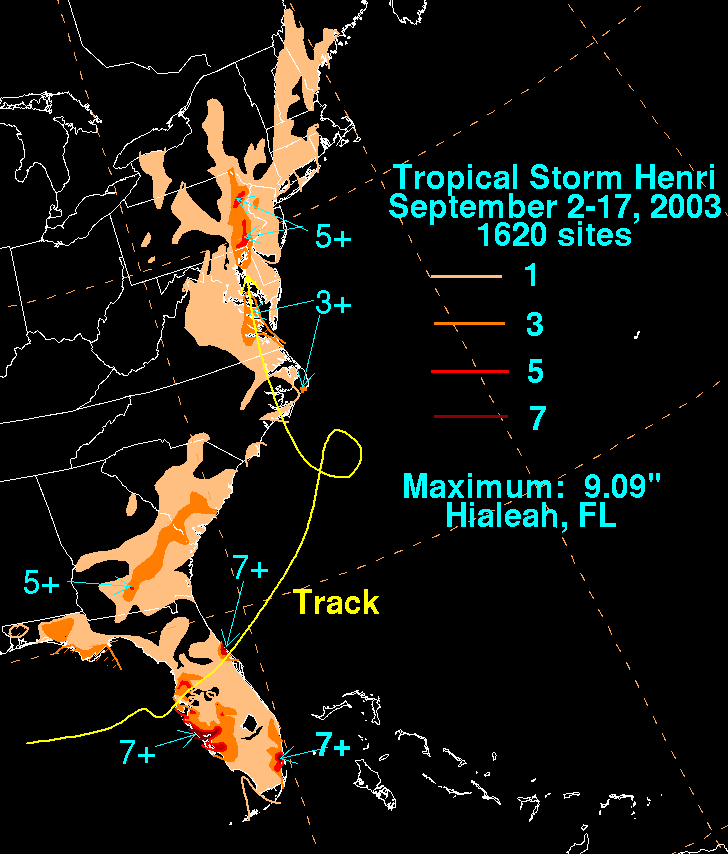
Rainfall from Henri

Henri dropped heavy rainfall along its path as a tropical cyclone and as a remnant low throughout the eastern United States.

=== Florida, Bahamas, and Bermuda ===
During its passage through Florida, Henri resulted in two injuries. In Lee County, lightning from a feeder band injured a man. In Pinellas Park, a driver hydroplaned and crashed along Interstate 275. A tornado was observed on September 5 near Zoo Miami, and was rated an F0 on the Fujita scale. Along Florida's west coast, wind gusts reached 29 mph (47 km/h) in several locations during Henri's passage. The tropical depression also produced higher surf, along with tides 1 ft (0.30 m) above normal. However, Henri's most significant effects in the state were from its heavy rainfall. Three locations observed rainfall totals of over 7 in (180 mm), with a statewide peak of 9.09 in (231 mm) in Hialeah in the southeast portion of the state. Two locations – Fort Myers and Sarasota–Bradenton International Airport – recorded rainfall records on September 5. The rains caused isolated street flooding in the state, which entered some houses in Punta Gorda due to wake from cars driving in the floods. Damage was estimated at $120,000. In Englewood, floods displaced residents, resulting in the American Red Cross opening up a temporary shelter. In Hernando County, a stationary thunderstorm dropped over 5 in (130 mm) of rain in around an hour. It caused a rapid flooding of roads, though quickly retreated. Damage was minor, due to lack of many homes in the area.

In the Bahamas, outer rainbands from Henri dropped around 1 inch (25 mm) of rain. Winds in the archipelago gusted to 32 mph (51 km/h). Just days after Hurricane Fabian struck Bermuda, moisture from Henri brought thunderstorms and heavy rainfall and thunderstorms totaling to 2.44 inches (62 mm) at the airport. This hindered cleanup efforts, though caused no known damage.

=== Mid-Atlantic ===
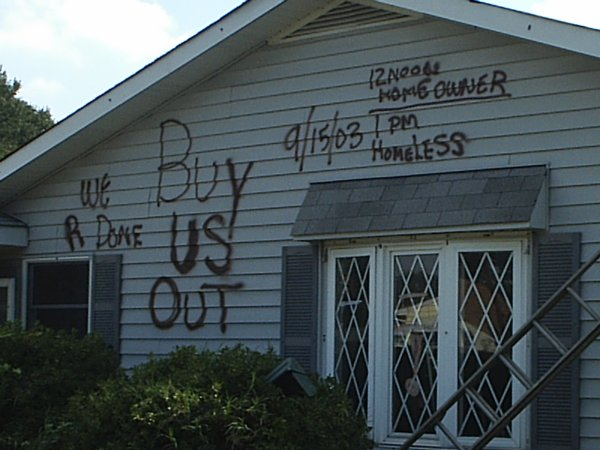
A destroyed Glenville, Delaware home on October 2, 2003, two weeks after Tropical Storm Henri flooded the subdivision

In North Carolina, Virginia, and Maryland, the remnants of Henri produced 1 to 3 in (25 to 76 mm) of rainfall. The rains in Baltimore, Maryland ended a seven-day dry period, the city's longest stretch without precipitation since October 2002. In parts of northern Delaware, the storm dropped over 10 in (250 mm) of rainfall over a five-hour period, as estimated by NEXRAD weather radars. The highest official rainfall total was 9.02 in (229 mm) in Hockessin. The rains led to flash flooding along the Red Clay Creek that led to record flow rates, exceeding 32,000 ft^{3} (910 m^{3}) per second near Wooddale. The event was estimated to have been a 1 in 500 year flood. In the now abandoned Glenville area, the floods damaged 194 houses, forcing residents to evacuate to a nearby elementary school. Several people required rescue from their inundated cars, and one person escaped their house by helicopter. The Red Clay Creek washed out the historic Wooddale Covered Bridge, and severely damaged the Ashland Covered Bridge. Floodwaters along the creek crested at 17.27 ft (5.26 m), which is 11.77 ft (3.59 m) above flood stage. The floods also destroyed six Wilmington & Western Railroad bridges, and washed out or damaged 8 mi (13 km) of track, causing $5.9 million in damage. Greenbank Mill, a historic gristmill complex, saw $450,000 in damage. A business along the White Clay Creek sustained millions in damage after floodwaters entered the building. Damage throughout the state reached $16.1 million.

Heavy rainfall from the remnants of Henri extended into eastern Pennsylvania, reaching 8.75 in (222 mm) in Downingtown. Several rivers crested above their flood stage, resulting in flash flooding that led to hundreds of emergency rescues. In Avondale, 250 people evacuated an apartment building, while in Kennet Square, 50 people required rescue from cars or their porches. The floods destroyed 12 homes and damaged another 360 across the region. About 109,000 people lost power due to downed trees and floods. The floods also damaged 22 bridges, including two that closed indefinitely. The floods closed several roads, including a portion of U.S. Route 1 in Chadds Ford. Damage in Pennsylvania totaled $3.54 million.

Rains from the remnants of Henri extended into New York and New England, reaching 2.57 in (65 mm) in Platte Clove, New York, and 2.36 in (60 mm) in Connecticut.

== Aftermath ==
On September 23, just days after the storm moved through, President George W. Bush declared New Castle County, Delaware as a disaster area following the effects of Henri and later Hurricane Isabel. The declaration designated the affected citizens eligible for grants to pay for temporary housing, house repairs, and serious disaster-related expenses. The declaration also allowed for federal funding for 75% of the repair cost for replacing public facilities. On September 26, President Bush also declared Chester County, Pennsylvania as a disaster area following the damage of Henri, Tropical Storm Isabel, and severe flooding unrelated to either tropical cyclone. By a month after the declaration, 342 homeowners and business owners applied for disaster aid, totaling to around $600,000 (2003 USD).

By two months after the storm, 659 Delaware residents had applied for disaster aid through the Federal Emergency Management Agency (FEMA), totaling to just over $1 million (2003 USD). Due to the storm damage, 200 homes in Glenville were relocated. 141 small businesses applied for loans, totaling to around $2.5 million (2003 USD). FEMA grants helped floodproof two businesses that could not afford to relocate. In addition, FEMA received 183 applications for public assistance, which would be used for rebuilding public roads and buildings. Over twenty volunteer organizations met to establish a long-term committee to find resources for disaster recovery needs. One goal sought by the committee was to find a permanent housing solution for everyone who was displaced from their houses from the storms. Volunteers also helped remove ruined appliances and furniture to local landfills, totaling to more than 300 tons. State and county governments in Delaware purchased 171 homes following the damage in the Glenville area, the highest number of houses purchased in the state due to storm damage. The house purchasing was done to mitigate the flood damage by restoring the area as a wetland. In 2005, New Castle County completed a debris cleanup of the Red Clay Creek. The Wilmington & Western Railroad reopened on June 28, 2007, utilizing funding from a variety of federal, state, and local resources. In December 2008, the Wooddale Covered Bridge reopened after being rebuilt 5 ft (1.5 m) higher.

== See also ==
- Tropical cyclones in 2003
- Weather of 2003
- Other storms of the same name
- Timeline of the 2003 Atlantic hurricane season
- List of Florida hurricanes (2000–present)
- List of Delaware hurricanes
- List of Pennsylvania hurricanes
