= List of storms named Henri =

The name Henri has been used for six tropical cyclones in the Atlantic Ocean:

- Hurricane Henri (1979) – took an unusual route around the Yucatán Peninsula, caused no significant damage
- Tropical Storm Henri (1985) – crossed Long Island as a weak storm
- Tropical Storm Henri (2003) – caused heavy rainfall across the United States East Coast, causing $19.6 million in damage
- Tropical Storm Henri (2009) – moderate tropical storm that formed northeast of the Lesser Antilles
- Tropical Storm Henri (2015) – short-lived tropical storm that stayed out to sea
- Hurricane Henri (2021) – moved clockwise around Bermuda before taking aim on southern New England; briefly strengthened into a Category 1 hurricane, before weakening back to a tropical storm and making landfall in Westerly, Rhode Island
