= Hurricane Henri =

Category 1 Atlantic hurricane in 2021

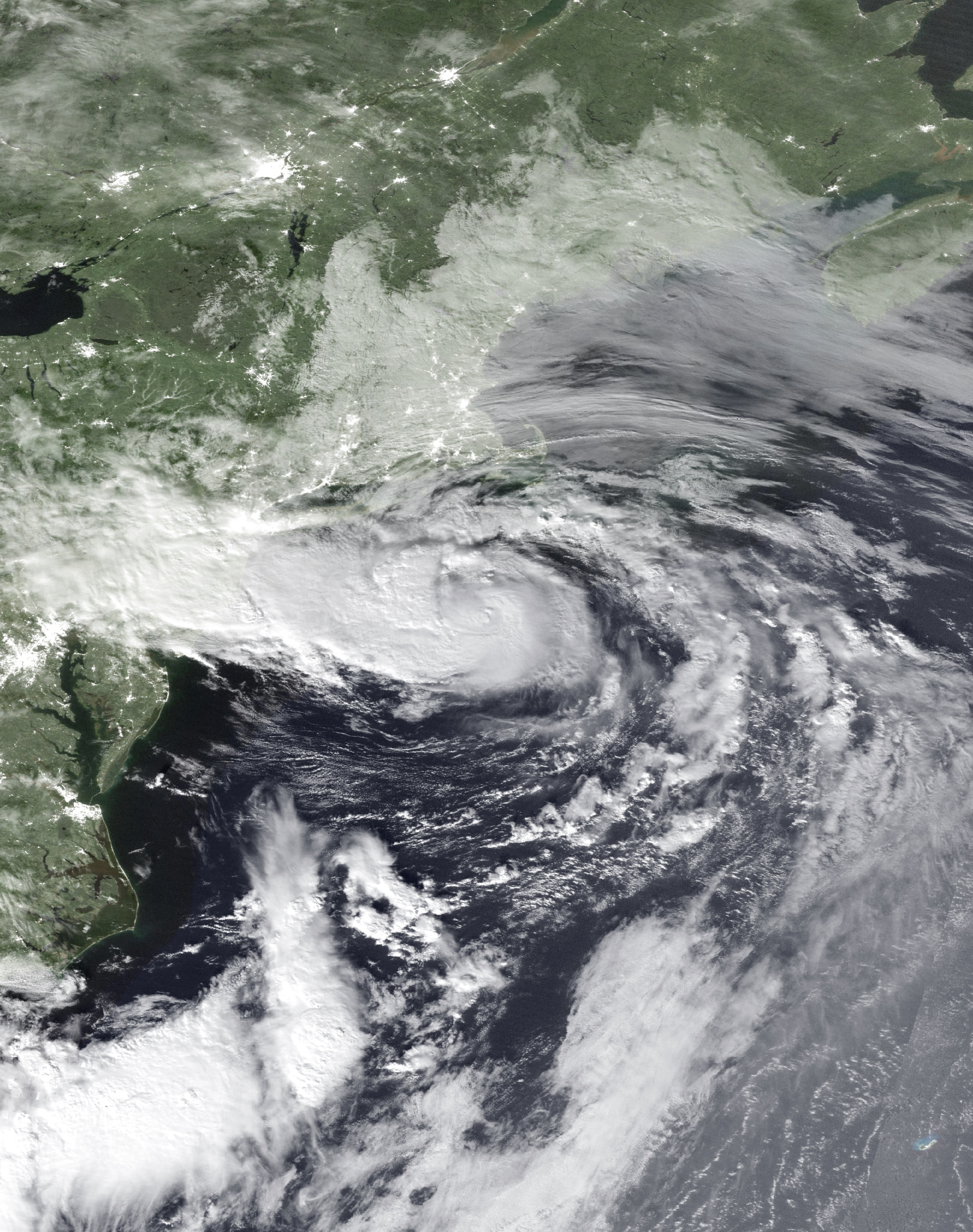
- Henri at peak intensity approaching New England early on August 22.

Meteorological history
- Formed: August 15, 2021
- Post-tropical: August 23, 2021
- Dissipated: August 27, 2021

Category 1 hurricane
- 1-minute sustained (SSHWS/NWS)
- Highest winds: 75 mph (120 km/h)
- Lowest pressure: 986 mbar (hPa); 29.12 inHg

Overall effects
- Fatalities: 2 direct
- Damage: $700 million (2021 USD)
- Areas affected: Bermuda, Northeastern United States, southern Nova Scotia
- IBTrACS
- Part of the 2021 Atlantic hurricane season

Hurricane Henri (/ɒnˈriː/ on-REE) was a tropical cyclone that impacted the Northeastern United States. The eighth named storm and third hurricane of the 2021 Atlantic hurricane season, Henri developed from a well-defined low-pressure system north-northeast of Bermuda, becoming a tropical depression on August 16. Nearly a day later, the system strengthened into Tropical Storm Henri. Henri continued to move south, and later southwest before strengthening steadily, reaching its initial peak intensity with winds of 70 mph (110 km/h) and a pressure of 994 mbar (29.4 inHg) early on August 19. Soon after, strong wind shear weakened Henri slightly. Eventually, on August 21, Henri strengthened into a Category 1 hurricane, before weakening back to a tropical storm and making landfall in Westerly, Rhode Island, on August 22, making it the second tropical cyclone to make landfall in the U.S. state of Rhode Island during the season, seven weeks after Elsa. It proceeded to move west-northwestward, weakening into a tropical depression while slowing down later that day. On August 23, Henri degenerated into a remnant low over New England, before dissipating the next day over the Atlantic.

Despite its relatively weak intensity, the storm brought very heavy rainfall over the Northeastern United States and New England, causing widespread flooding in many areas, including cities such as New York and Boston. Power outages became extensive in the region, while wind damage was sparse in comparison. In the aftermath of Henri, many crews were put in place from around the United States to help with recovery efforts and rescues. The storm caused less damage overall than initially feared, due to a weaker landfall and faster weakening trend compared to what was previously forecast. Henri continued to drop large amounts of rain as it weakened over land, prolonging floods and power outages. Henri killed two people and caused an estimated $700 million (2021 USD) in damage.

== Meteorological history ==
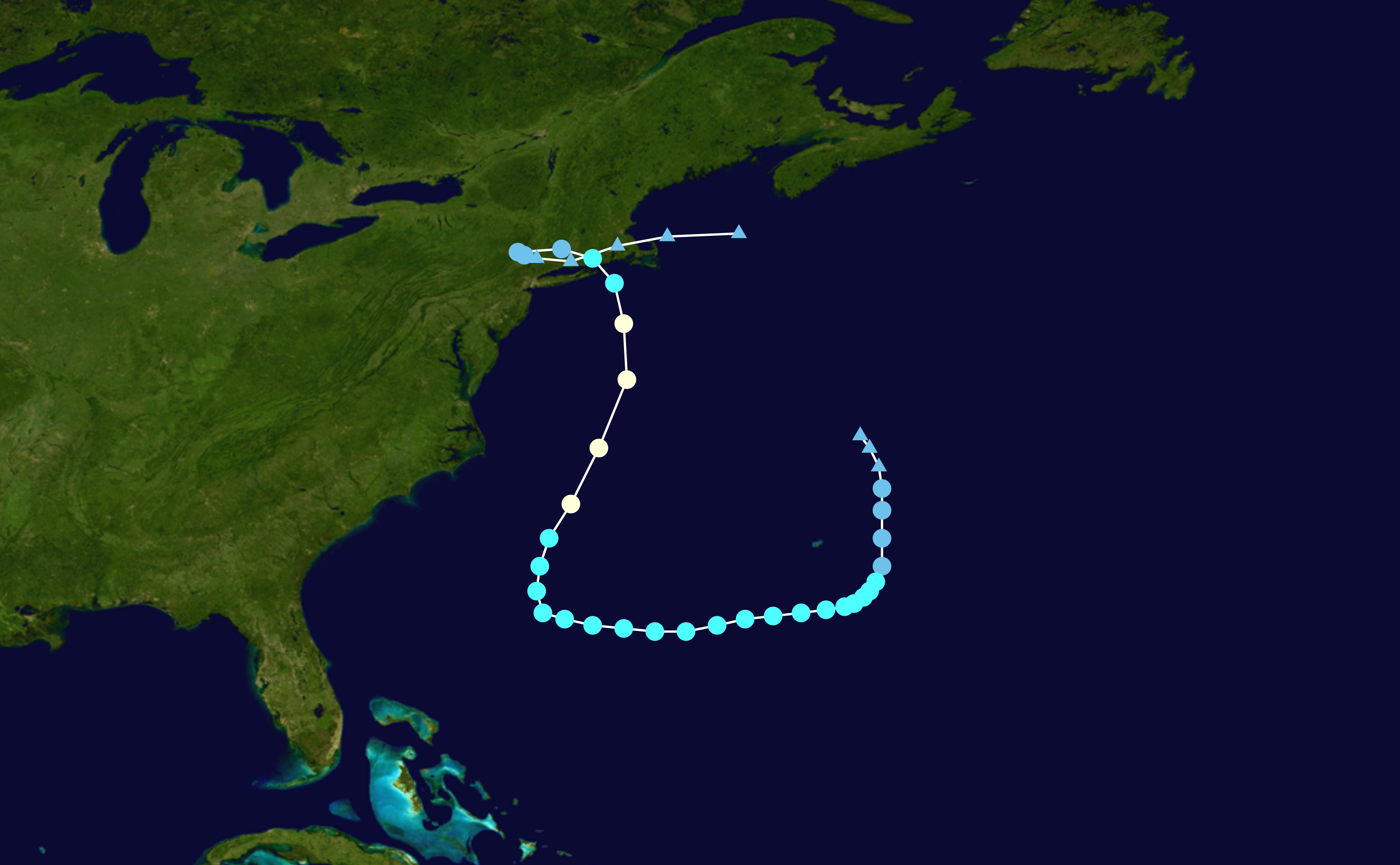
Map plotting the storm's track and intensity, according to the Saffir–Simpson scale Map key Saffir–Simpson scale Tropical depression (≤38 mph, ≤62 km/h) Tropical storm (39–73 mph, 63–118 km/h) Category 1 (74–95 mph, 119–153 km/h) Category 2 (96–110 mph, 154–177 km/h) Category 3 (111–129 mph, 178–208 km/h) Category 4 (130–156 mph, 209–251 km/h) Category 5 (≥157 mph, ≥252 km/h) Unknown Storm type Tropical cyclone Subtropical cyclone Extratropical cyclone, remnant low, tropical disturbance, or monsoon depression

A cluster of thunderstorms associated with a mid-level disturbance emerged off the U.S. Mid-Atlantic coast between late on August 11 and early the following day. The disturbance generated a weak surface trough on August 14, which by the end of that day developed into a surface low pressure area about 230 mi (370 km) north-northeast of Bermuda. That same day, the National Hurricane Center (NHC) mentioned the weather system as an area of potential tropical cyclogenesis, as the low drifted southward. The thunderstorms became more organized on August 15. In the early hours of August 16, the NHC classified the system as Tropical Depression Eight, while it was located about 135 mi (217 km) east-northeast of Bermuda. Warm sea surface temperatures favorable for the system's development were counteracted by northerly wind shear. The nascent depression moved slowly southwestward, steered around a ridge off the coast of the Eastern United States. Later that day, the depression intensified into Tropical Storm Henri, after the storm's deep convection organized further near the center.

By August 17, Henri moved westward, toward the Eastern United States. Its convection evolved into curved rainbands, and an eye feature was evident in the storm on Bermuda radar; however, it was still affected by wind shear at the time. The shear and dry air caused the storm's structure to deteriorate on August 19. On August 20, Henri turned towards the north, steering by an approaching trough over the Appalachians and a building ridge to the northeast of the storm. On August 21, at 15:00 UTC, Henri became a Category 1 hurricane after reconnaissance aircraft found hurricane-force winds. It would maintain hurricane intensity for another day, before weakening back to a high-end tropical storm at 11:00 UTC on August 22, as it approached southern New England. The storm made landfall on August 22, in Westerly, Rhode Island, around 16:15 UTC, with maximum sustained winds of 60 mph (95 km/h). The storm rapidly weakened into a tropical depression early the next day, before becoming post-tropical. Henri's remnants persisted for another day before dissipating off the coast of Nova Scotia.

== Preparations ==
=== Bermuda ===
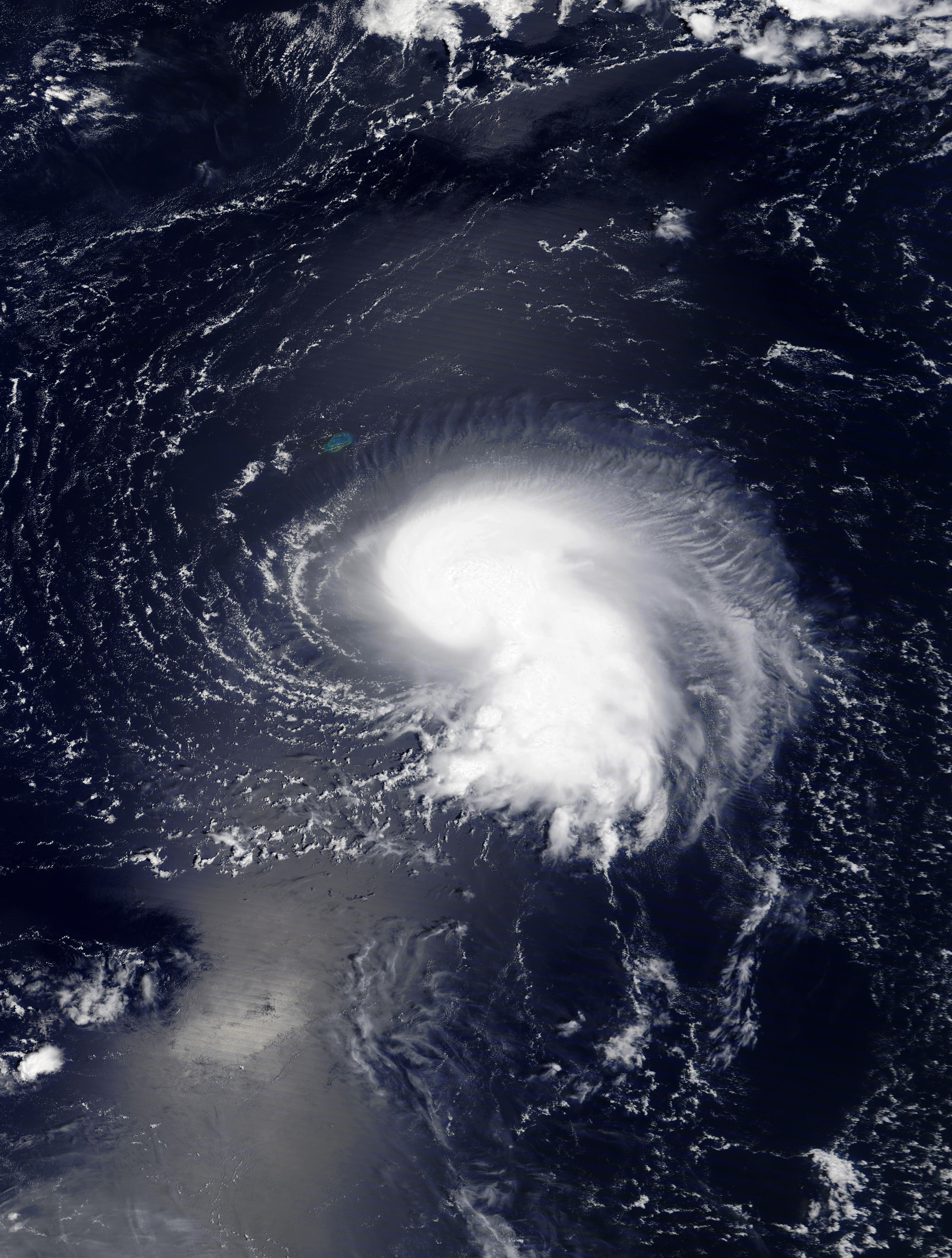
Tropical Storm Henri southeast of Bermuda on August 17

At 03:00 UTC on August 16, when Tropical Depression Eight was designated, the Bermuda Weather Service issued a tropical storm watch as tropical storm conditions were possible. When Henri started to move away from Bermuda, the Bermuda Weather Service discontinued the tropical storm watch for the territory.

=== United States ===
All Northeast Regional and Acela service north of New York City was suspended on August 22 was suspended due to Henri.

The Governor of Massachusetts Charlie Baker held a press conference on August 20. He activated 1,000 members of the Massachusetts National Guard to assist with water rescues. In Newport, Rhode Island, a beach and a road were set to be closed. Public Services crews were ordered to be on standby to respond to fallen trees. The Connecticut Department of Energy and Environmental Protection ordered campgrounds in the state to be closed from August 21 to August 23.

On August 20, Governor Ned Lamont of Connecticut declared a state of emergency ahead of the arrival of the storm. Mandatory evacuations were ordered in several communities. Storm surge, flash flooding, and high winds widespread throughout a large area were of the utmost concern preceding Henri's arrival. Hundreds of flights were delayed or cancelled at major airports across LaGuardia, John F. Kennedy, Logan, and Newark. Public transit including railway and ferries were suspended in these regions as well. On Long Island, service along the entire Greenport Branch and portions of the Montauk Branch of the Long Island Railroad were suspended. All state parks south of Interstate 84 in New York were shut down. Inland residents were reminded that they could be hit hard as well coastal communities. Tractor trailers were banned from driving on Interstate 95 in Connecticut at 15:00 UTC on August 22. Shelters were opened around New England. In Massachusetts, storm barriers abroad were closed to protect from potential flooding. Henri was expected to move to a stall over the Connecticut–New York border, highly exacerbating floods in the areas.

New Jersey Governor Phil Murphy urged people to stay home during the storm, and advising people to look out for flooding and power lines. He made comparisons to Hurricane Sandy of 2012, which destroyed the state's coast, being thankful that Henri was not as bad as it was previously anticipated. His biggest concern was flooding in the state. President Joe Biden deployed the Federal Emergency Management Agency to help preparation efforts for Henri's damage on August 22. He also spoke with the governors of Connecticut, Rhode Island, and New York, warning about the damage that could be done by the storm. The NHC placed most of the Northeast under a flooding risk from August 22 through early August 24, warning of heavy flooding in Poconos, northern New Jersey, New York City, the Catskills, Connecticut, and western Massachusetts. The entire risk zone was expected to see 3–6 in (76–152 mm) of rain, with isolated double-digit totals. Flash flood watches remained in place as Henri slowed down over New England.

Up to 33 million people were still under flood warnings on August 23.

== Impact ==
=== United States ===
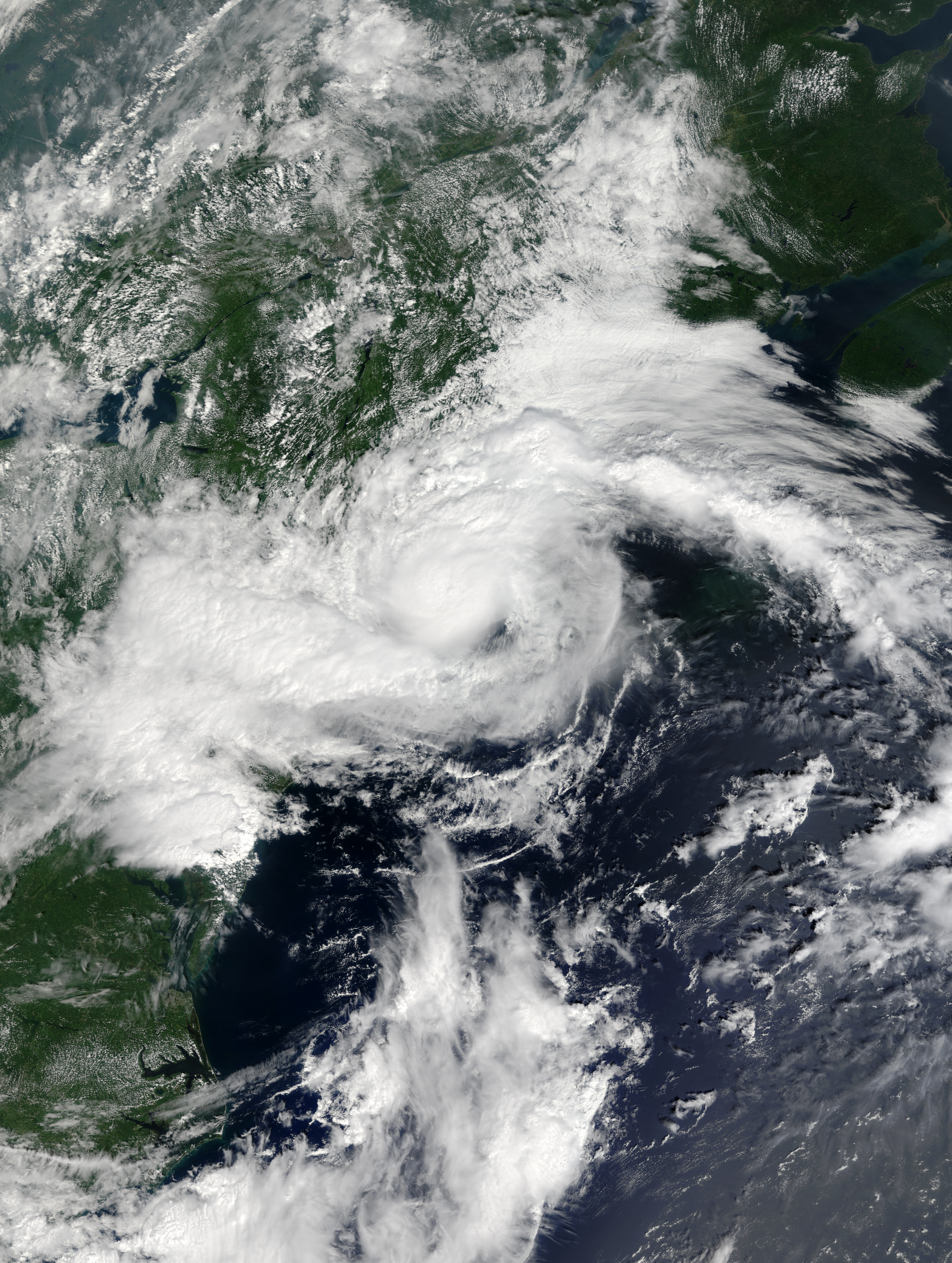
Tropical Storm Henri making landfall in Rhode Island on August 22

Power outages were widespread through most of New England due to Henri's impacts. At least 140,000 houses experienced outages across New Jersey to Maine. Conditions rapidly deteriorated the morning Henri made landfall, causing flooding in numerous locations across the Northeastern United States. By the morning of August 23, over 65,000 were still without power. Henri had weakened more quickly over land than initially expected, lessening overall impacts. Insured losses across the Northeast were estimated at $155 million by Karen Clark & Co.

==== New York ====
Record-breaking rainfall of 1.94 inches (49 mm) fell in just one hour in Central Park, the then-wettest hour on record for New York City. A concert which was to be held in Central Park was postponed that same night due to lightning and harsh weather. A Major League Baseball game between the New York Yankees and Minneapolis Twins was postponed. A Major League Soccer game between the New York Red Bulls and New York City FC was also postponed after a two and a half hour delay. The hourly rainfall record was the wettest in 150 years, and Brooklyn drivers abandoned their cars after waist-deep flooding inundated their vehicles. 4.45 inches (113 mm) in total fell during August 21, the highest total in a day for the city (since 2014), while the 7.01-inch (178 mm) total was the highest since Irene in 2011.

Great Gull Island clocked in a 72 mph (116 km/h) wind gust. Tuxedo Park collected 5 inches (130 mm), Henricks collected 6 inches (150 mm), and Nyack allocated 3.6 inches (91 mm). Parts of Staten Island had slightly more than 4 inches (100 mm) of rainfall. Power outages decreased greatly on August 23, with 71 outages in Ulster County and 9 in Dutchess County. 101 of Central Hudson Gas & Electric Corp's more than 300,000 customers were without power that day. In total, a few thousand people had lost power at several points during August 21 and 22. Officials reported no flooded roads in Dutchess, though there were some fallen trees. Ulster had no reported major floods. Bronx River Parkway was closed for two days, where crews scraped off four inches (10 centimeters) of mud. Saw Mill River Parkway was closed for two days as well.

Henri's rainfall, along with New York's 3rd wettest July, made 2021 the second-wettest summer ever in New York City; with 23.36 inches (593 mm) in total (on August 23). Nearly 2 months's worth of rain fell in a day and a half in Central Park. The city's storm-sewer system, which can only handle about 3.8 billion U.S. gallons (14 billion liters) daily, had over 42 billion US gal (160 billion L) fall into it from Henri from August 21–22. Videos taken in the subway system showed rain pouring down, these led to a few disruptions in service.

==== Rhode Island ====
On the morning of August 22, over 58,000 people were without power in Rhode Island, with outages being particularly widespread in Washington County. Wind gusts reached over 70 mph (110 km/h). Trees and power lines were downed from the storm. Newport was spared from the worst of the storm. A 30-foot (9.1 m) sailboat named Paws washed up to shore in the city, however, its owner was not found. In Cranston, there were 11 inches of rainfall, causing flooding. Nearly 41,000 people were still without power the morning of August 23. 75 percent of the town of South Kingstown lost power on August 22. The state was to have been hit an estimated 15 to 20 percent harder in power outages than Massachusetts and Connecticut.

==== New Jersey ====
In New Jersey, more than 8 inches (200 mm) of rain fell in the town of Cranbury. Up to 9 inches (230 mm) of rain fell in the state, bringing heavy flooding in multiple areas, such as Jamesburg, where heavy rain caused flooding on roads. Numerous roads were closed in Middlesex, with vehicles submerged in floodwaters. Homes were flooded with up to 3 feet (0.91 meters) of water in Cranbury, and some residences and businesses were flooded in Milltown. During the early afternoon of August 22, over 4,500 were reported without power in the state. Some places were flooded with up 4 feet (1.2 m) of water, and left behind 3 inches (7.6 cm) of mud.

Henri dropped 7.84 inches (199 mm) of rain in Ringwood, 6.94 inches (176 mm) in Harrison, and 5.65 inches (144 mm) in Ship Bottom. Phil Murphy said that "part of the state got crushed". Houses in Rossmoor were swamped with floodwater, some up to 2 feet (61 cm) high. Spotswood had seen extensive structural damage, including parts that were "completely engulfed in water". More than half of Helmetta's 73 houses suffered notable flooding damage. Hoboken and Jersey City both saw large amounts of flooding. The former saw 2.43 inches (62 mm) fall in 14 hours, with a total of 4.07 inches (103 mm). The rainfall was the most recorded in a single storm since 2016. The latter experienced city-wide flooding, with a particularly major incident near Bayside Park. There, sustained rainfall caused a 50-inch (1.27 m) sewer line to collapse. Many roads around the area were closed, though only one was closed for the entire weekend. A sink hole opened in Merseles Street.

Over six point five inches (170 mm) of rain fell in Ship Bottom, where even more flooding was experienced. Areas north of Brant Beach in Long Beach Township, to Barnegat Light, received 4 to 7 inches (100 to 180 mm) of rain, compared to the average of 2 to 4 inches (51 to 102 mm). Harvey Cedars' police chief Robert Burnaford said the borough had "dodged a bullet".

==== Connecticut ====
Saturated ground from the remnants of Fred just a few days prior to Henri's arrival worsened the flooding situation in the state as the storm passed over. Governor Ned Lamont stated the rain was "coming down in buckets". 7,600 people were without power on the morning of August 22. Trees and wires were reported to be downed. Four nursing homes were evacuated when Henri made landfall. Over 248 nursing homes were affected in the towns of Old Saybrook, Mystic, Guilford, and West Haven. Soundview Beach's water overflowed, causing "Hubcap"-deep waters in the area. Approximately 9,000 of Eversource Energy's customers had no power. The town of Canterbury reported a loss of power for 95% of their businesses and residences. A road in Manchester collapsed due to rainfall saturation.

Rainfall totals for the state were much less than initially forecasted. New London received the most, where 3.7 inches (94 mm) fell. 1.56 inches (40 mm) fell in Danbury, 1.54 inches (39 mm) in Shelton, 1.17 inches (30 mm) in Norwalk, 1.08 inches (27 mm) in Westport, and exactly 1 inch (25.4 mm) in Greenwich. In Pawcatuck, a tree fell onto a home's roof, damaging the roof and toppling the head of a chimney. 30 cars in a parking lot were trapped due to flooding. Hartford's donation drive for Back-To-School efforts were hindered, where as a delivery of 500 book-bags was delayed. 100 of these were ruined due to water damage.

Botticello Farm in Manchester had suffered crop damage to their tobacco plants, as well as their corn. Overall, Henri added to the struggle of farming in 2021's summer due to excessive rainfall. The library in New Canaan had suffered minimal damage.

==== Massachusetts ====
Wind gusts ranging from 40 to 60 miles per hour (64 to 97 km/h) were recorded. In Oxford, a large tree was uprooted and fell onto and damaged a house. The people residing inside the house survived. The tree fell in part due to saturated grounds from the remnants of Tropical Storm Fred, several days earlier. A 300-year old home was damaged by a falling tree. Some other trees fell on cars and blocked roadways. Henri also caused power outages in the state, with Worcester County reporting the most outages. Due to the storm, the game between the Boston Red Sox and Texas Rangers had to be postponed.

Three EF0 tornadoes caused minor damage in Marlborough, Stow, and Bolton. One touched down west of Interstate 495 near the John J. Carroll Water Treatment Plant, and entered into a business park. Another tornado, in Bolton, downed trees, with one of them falling on power lines. A third one touched down near the Stow Police Department, downing a large tree. A waterspout formed over a lake in Ashburnham.

==== Elsewhere ====
Two family members drowned near a pier in Oak Island, North Carolina after being caught in strong rip currents produced as a result of Henri.

In Pennsylvania, 6.03 inches (153 mm) fell in Albrightsville, 5.80 inches (147 mm) in Gouldsboro, 5.68 inches (144 mm) in Mount Pocono, 5.54 inches (141 mm) in Jim Thorpe, 4.86 inches (123 mm) in Stroudsburg, and 4.29 inches (109 mm) in Thornhurst. These totals caused flooding in local areas. Major flooding was seen in Dunmore, where a sewer was overflowed, causing a temporary geyser. Nearby basements and parking lots were damaged. Flooding forced a portion of Interstate 80 in Monroe County to close. Parx Racing was forced to reschedule the Grade III Parx Dash Stakes which was originally scheduled for August 24, 2021 and moved to the following week, due to the state of the turf track. The Kalahari resort in the Poconos was forced to temporarily shut down due to flooding.

States as far as Maine saw deluges, due to Henri's large size and slow movement. There were hundreds of power outages in the state; however, outage numbers were much lower in Vermont and in New Hampshire. In New Hampshire, portions of the White Mountain National Forest briefly closed due to the hurricane.

== Aftermath ==
Several thousands of crews were put on stand by to respond to what was expected to be widespread power outages. Connecticut was assisted by crews coming from states as far away as Texas. People were rescued in New Jersey after very high flooding, including 86 in Newark, 16 of whom were children. Rhode Island Governor Daniel McKee surveyed damage done by the storm in the southern region on August 22. Ned Lamont and Phil Murphy were set to tour damage on August 23. In South Kingstown and surrounding areas, 500 line crews and an additional 200+ street crews, were deployed to help restore power, as well as a state damage assessment team. Monroe Township opened a shelter on August 23 to help rescue those who lost their homes due to flooding, or were suffering from power outages.

On August 23, Lamont expressed confidence that nearly 90 percent of the state's 26,000 outages, would be recovered by 6 p.m. that day. These comments contrasted his statements from Isaias the previous year, which knocked out power to 750,000 houses, some for a week. The governor's new regulatory procedure that was in put into place after Isaias was proven to work well. The Rhode Island Department of Environmental Management helped clean up damage from the storm. Daniel McKee commended the work of the utility National Grid, praising the efforts to help restore power in Rhode Island. Power was expected to be recovered to all by August 25. American Red Cross helped support recovery efforts in Monroe Township.

Sewage was a concern for those in the community of Rossmoor, due to an overflowing of the system. Homes had to be abandoned due to water damage. Firefighters in Manchester, Connecticut helped evacuate 18 homes and made several rescues. President Biden declared disasters in Massachusetts, Rhode Island, Vermont and Connecticut. Over 200 residents of Helmetta fled to higher ground, and took refuge in hotels due to flooding. Pennsylvania deployed 16 members of its federal disaster response team to Connecticut. New York State's Attorney General, Letitia James, warned of price gouging of essential items, as Henri passed. On August 22, the Federal Government declared disasters for 26 New York counties.

== See also ==
- Weather of 2021
- Tropical cyclones in 2021
- Other storms named Henri
- Timeline of the 2021 Atlantic hurricane season
- List of Category 1 Atlantic hurricanes
- Hurricane Carol (1954) – one of the worst hurricanes to impact Connecticut and Rhode Island.
- Hurricane Belle (1976) – caused moderate damage along the East Coast.
- Hurricane Bob (1991) – one of the costliest hurricanes to impact New England.
- Hurricane Irene (2011) – affected the East Coast as a minimal hurricane.
- Hurricane Sandy (2012) – destructive hurricane which caused significant damage.
