= Hurricane Fabian =

Category 4 Atlantic hurricane in 2003

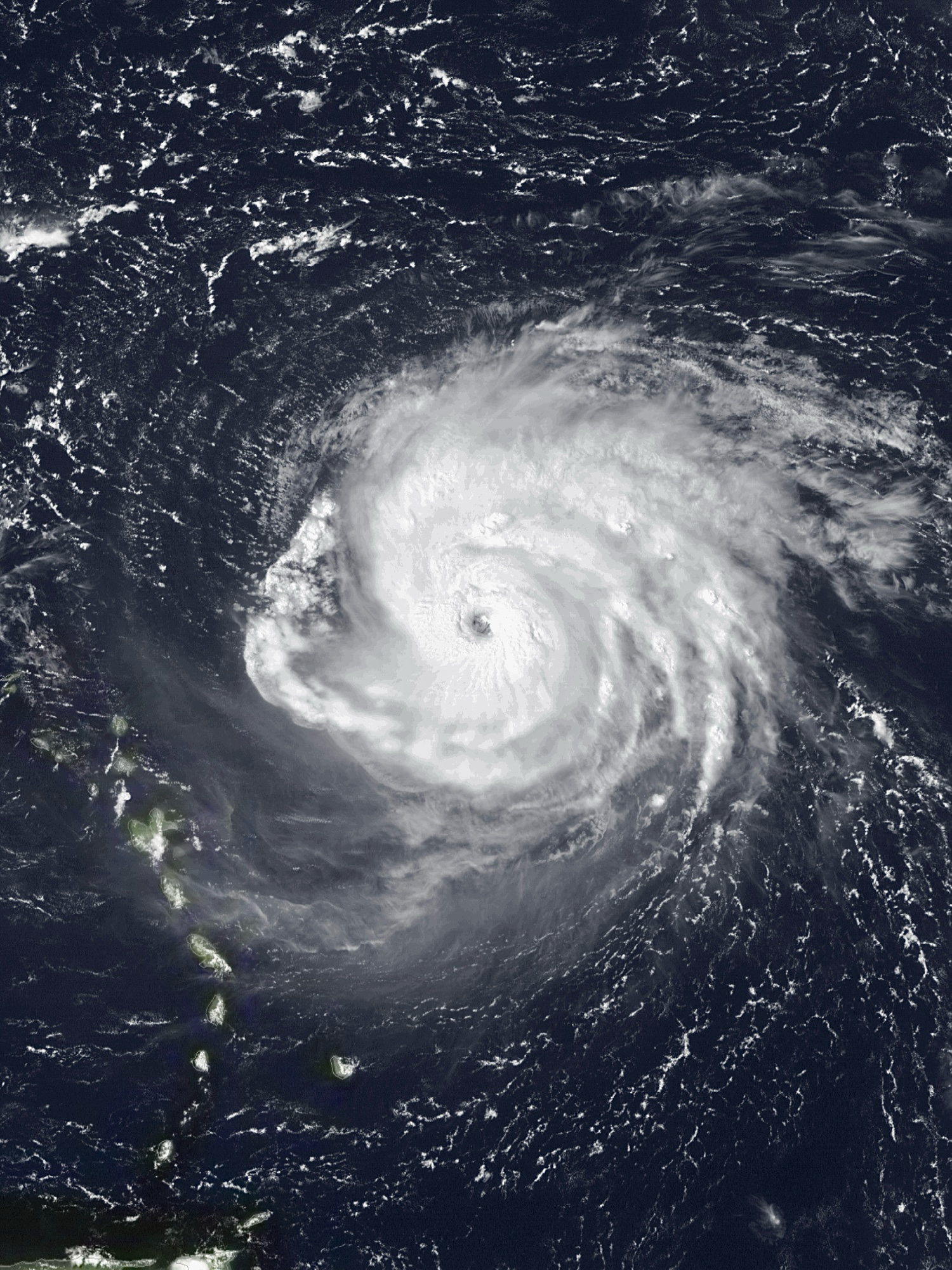
- Fabian at peak intensity on September 1

Meteorological history
- Formed: August 27, 2003
- Extratropical: September 8, 2003
- Dissipated: September 10, 2003

Category 4 major hurricane
- 1-minute sustained (SSHWS/NWS)
- Highest winds: 145 mph (230 km/h)
- Lowest pressure: 939 mbar (hPa); 27.73 inHg

Overall effects
- Fatalities: 9 total
- Damage: $300 million (2003 USD)
- Areas affected: Leeward Islands; Southeastern United States; Bermuda; Eastern Canada; Iceland
- IBTrACS
- Part of the 2003 Atlantic hurricane season

Hurricane Fabian was one of the strongest and most damaging tropical cyclones on record to affect Bermuda, when it passed just west of the North Atlantic island in September 2003. The hurricane originated from a tropical wave that left western Africa, and developed into Tropical Depression Ten on August 27. On the next day, the National Hurricane Center (NHC) upgraded it to Tropical Storm Fabian, the sixth named storm of the annual Atlantic hurricane season. It moved west-northwestward under the influence of the subtropical ridge to its north, and steadily strengthened in an area of warm sea surface temperatures and light wind shear. Within 18 hours of attaining hurricane status, Fabian became a major hurricane, the first of the season. (Note: A major hurricane is a storm that ranks as Category 3 or higher on the Saffir–Simpson hurricane scale.) The hurricane attained a peak intensity of 145 mph (233 km/h) on September 1, and it slowly weakened as it turned northward. On September 5, Fabian made a direct hit on Bermuda with wind speeds of over 120 mph (190 km/h). After passing the island, the hurricane turned to the northeast, and became extratropical on September 8, before dissipating two days later.

Fabian was the strongest hurricane to hit Bermuda since Hurricane Arlene in 1963. It was the first deadly hurricane in Bermuda since satellites began tracking hurricanes. A strong storm surge associated with the hurricane killed four people crossing a causeway on Bermuda, temporarily closing the only link between two islands. Fabian's powerful winds caused power outages and damaged roofs throughout the island. There was a shortage of material for the traditional limestone roofs, as well as supplies to restore electricity. The habitat of the endangered Bermuda petrel, better known as the cahow, was disrupted by the hurricane, leading volunteer to transport the species to a safer location. Strong swells killed a swimmer in Puerto Rico and North Carolina, while also causing damage in the northern Dominican Republic. A ship capsized in the Grand Banks, south of Island, killing three people. In all, Fabian caused around US$300 million in damage and nine deaths. (Note: All currency totals are unadjusted for inflation and in 2003 United States dollars.)

== Meteorological history ==
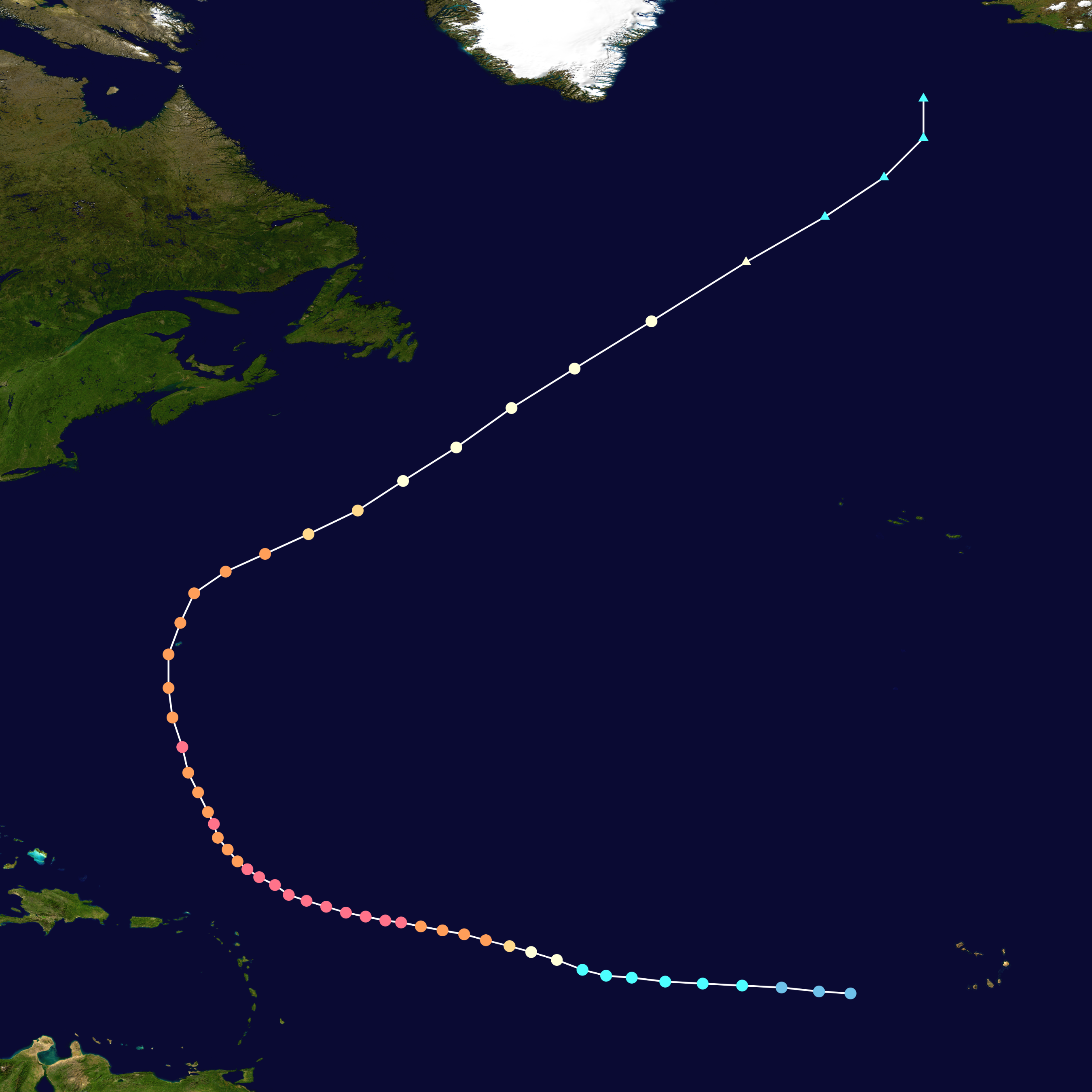
Map plotting the storm's track and intensity, according to the Saffir–Simpson scale Map key Saffir–Simpson scale Tropical depression (≤38 mph, ≤62 km/h) Tropical storm (39–73 mph, 63–118 km/h) Category 1 (74–95 mph, 119–153 km/h) Category 2 (96–110 mph, 154–177 km/h) Category 3 (111–129 mph, 178–208 km/h) Category 4 (130–156 mph, 209–251 km/h) Category 5 (≥157 mph, ≥252 km/h) Unknown Storm type Tropical cyclone Subtropical cyclone Extratropical cyclone, remnant low, tropical disturbance, or monsoon depression

On August 25, a tropical wave emerged off the coast of Africa.Tracking westward, the wave developed convection over its center, and conducive conditions allowed it to develop further. The system passed through the Cape Verde islands later that day. Early on August 27, convection increased and consolidated near the center, and later that day the wave developed into Tropical Depression Ten while located 420 miles (680 km) west of the Cape Verde islands. Moving westward into an area of warm waters and low vertical shear, the convection increased and banding features became more prominent. On August 28, the National Hurricane Center (NHC) upgraded the depression to Tropical Storm Fabian, the sixth named storm of the season.

Amid favorable atmospheric conditions, Fabian continued to intensify as it moved across the Atlantic Ocean. Banding features and outflow continued to develop as a ring of convection formed around the center. On August 30, Fabian intensified into a hurricane, as its forward path slowed and curved to the west-northwest. An eye developed in the center of the deepest convection. and Fabian quickly strengthened and attained major hurricane status late that day, or a Category 3 on the Saffir-Simpson scale. It was the first major hurricane of the season. Deep convection became very concentric around the 11.5 miles (18.5 km) wide eye, and the hurricane reached winds of 125 mph (201 km/h) early on August 31. At this time, the deepest convection near the eye degraded in appearance, and Fabian temporarily stopped its strengthening trend.

Late on August 31, the eye became distinct again within a perfectly round area of deep convection. Outflow continued to expand in all directions, and Fabian intensified into a Category 4 hurricane. Thunderstorm activity near the eyewall became more intense, and the cloud tops in the eyewall became much cooler; simultaneously, outflow away from the eye became much more symmetrical, both signs of an intensifying tropical cyclone. Fabian reached its peak intensity of 145 mph (233 km/h) on September 1 while located 345 miles (555 km) east of the northern Lesser Antilles. After maintaining its peak intensity for 12 hours Fabian degraded due to internal fluctuations, and began to weaken.

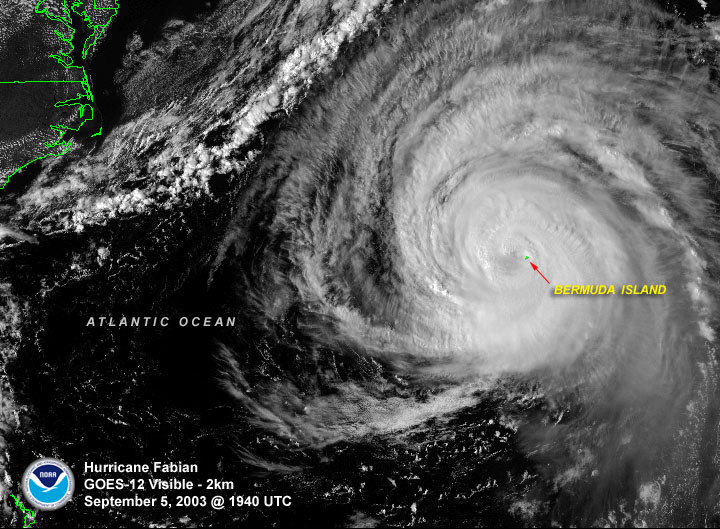
Hurricane Fabian over Bermuda late on September 5

The hurricane turned to the northwest on September 2 in response to a weakness in the subtropical ridge, a break caused by a mid-level circulation over the southwest Atlantic Ocean. After fading back to a Category 3 hurricane, Fabian re-intensified on September 4, and regained Category 4 status for a short time. The hurricane weakened again as it accelerated northward towards Bermuda, a motion due to an approaching mid-level trough. As small pockets of dry air became entrained in the eyewall, Fabian weakened slightly, passing just 14 miles (23 km) west of Bermuda on September 5 as a 120 mph (190 km/h) Category 3 hurricane. The eastern portion of the eyewall moved over the island, marking a direct hit, but not a landfall. Fabian was the strongest hurricane to hit Bermuda since Arlene in 1963.

After passing Bermuda, Fabian accelerated northeastward, and weakened to a 105 mph (169 km/h) Category 2 hurricane on September 7. Steady weakening occurred as the hurricane moved into an area of increasing wind shear, drier air, and progressively cooler waters. On September 8, while located 680 miles (1,090 km) east-northeast of Cape Race, Newfoundland, Fabian transitioned into an extratropical storm, with no deep convection remaining near the center. Fabian's extratropical remnant turned to the north on September 9, and on September 10, Fabian's remnant merged with another extratropical storm while located between southern Greenland and Iceland.

== Preparations ==
Several days prior to Fabian striking Bermuda, computer models forecast a ridge of high pressure would force the hurricane to the west of the island by 200 miles (320 km). However, the forecast track shifted closer to the island as Fabian approached. On September 1, the Bermuda Weather Service warned residents about the hurricane's potential threat. A day later, the Bermuda Electric Light Company Limited (BELCO) began preparing utilities for a direct hit from Fabian. On September 4 about 35 hours before Fabian's closest approach, the Bermuda Weather Service issued a hurricane watch for the island. Six hours later it was upgraded to a hurricane warning.

All government offices and many businesses closed on the day prior to the hurricane hitting. All schools were closed, while all flights in and out of the island were canceled. Officials opened emergency shelters, and recommended 2,000 low-lying residents to evacuate. Residents purchased supplies at gas stations, banks, and supermarkets. About 160 people evacuated from a hotel on the south shore of the island. Several cruise ships on the island departed early to avoid the hurricane. Local insurance companies on Bermuda experienced a great increase in business, as residents renewed lapsed policies or signed up for new policies for homes or businesses, though marine policies were stopped several days before the hurricane struck. The arrival of Fabian forced the cancellation or delay of several sports events, including a cricket match, a football game, and a dinghy race.

== Impact ==
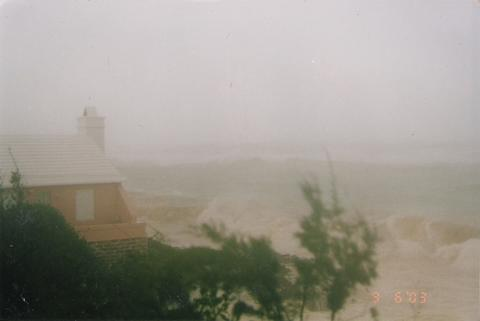
A house at Smith's Parish, Bermuda during the approach of the storm

=== Caribbean ===
The hurricane produced storm surge damage in Antigua and Barbuda, where some boats were damaged. Along the north coast of Puerto Rico, high waves killed a swimmer in Isla Verde. Strong swells and high tides produced large waves on the north coast of Puerto Rico, washing out beaches in various locations. Waves knocked out a 10 ft (3.0 m) portion of a construction site in Ocean Park, resulting in US$30,000 in damage. In the Dominican Republic, the hurricane produced waves of up to 8 ft (2.4 m) in height. Due to the waves and gusty winds, boats were advised to stay at port. Several families had to be evacuated in Nagua when rough seas flooded their homes.

=== Bermuda ===
For about three hours, the eyewall of Fabian moved over Bermuda, although the center remained west of the island. At Fort George, the Bermuda Harbour Radio recorded a 164 mph (265 km/h) wind gust at a height of 255 ft (78 m); the radio mast broke shortly thereafter. L.F. Wade International Airport estimated wind sustained winds of 121 mph (194 km/h), with wind gusts to 150 mph (241 km/h), after the facility lost electricity. Hurricane conditions briefly halted when the eye of Fabian crossed Bermuda. For around 21 hours, gale-force were observed at the airport. Upon passing the island, the hurricane produced an estimated 9.8 to 11.5 ft (3 to 3.5 m) storm surge. Four people died when the storm surge swept two vehicles off the causeway between St. George's Parish and St. David's Island, leading to a search and rescue mission. This made Fabian the first deadly hurricane in Bermuda since satellites began tracking tropical cyclones. The hurricane also dropped light rainfall during its passage, reaching 1.82 inches (46 mm). There were also several unofficial reports of tornadoes.

Large waves battered the southern portion of the island for several days, reaching heights of 25 to 35 feet (7.6 to 10.7 m) at the worst of the hurricane. The waves caused extensive damage along the island's southern coastline. High waves damaged coastal structures along the southern coastline, including seawalls, houses, cliffs, trees, and parts of South Shore Road. The waves also eroded beaches and dunes, while damaging part of Gurnet Rock. Strong waves collapsed a sea wall in Hamilton, causing traffic jams for one day until it was fixed. The hurricane also wrecked the remaining walls of the Southampton Island Fort. The strong waves broke a boat from its moorings at Spanish Point. Waves reaching 8 ft (2.4 m) in height destroyed recording equipment belonging to the Bermuda Weather Service.

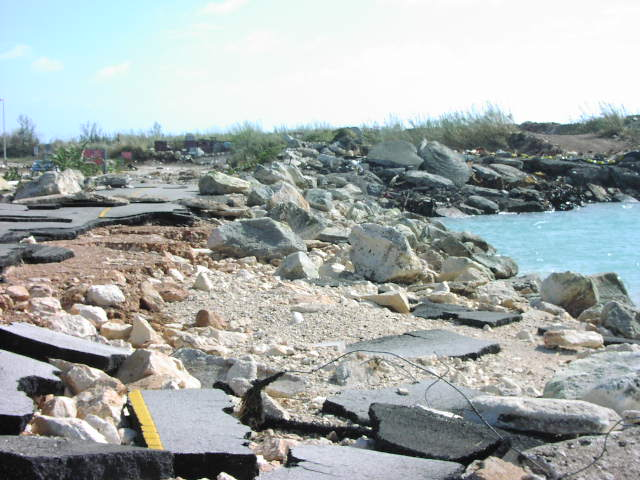
Road washout at Bermuda International Airport

At least 10 people sustained injuries related to the hurricane. Damage on Bermuda totaled US$300 million, reportedly the worst to affect the area since 1926. Fabian caused extensive roof damage across the island, particularly areas facing south and east. Although concrete buildings generally fared well, most of the damaged buildings had traditional limestone roofs. Bermuda's electrical distribution system sustained damage and required repairs. About 76% of the island, or about 25,000 people, lost power, mostly areas outside of Hamilton lost power. The airport sustained US$15 million in damages, causing it to be closed for several days, after the runway was covered with debris. The winds severely damaged five hotels on Bermuda, including two that remained closed until the spring of 2004. The island's golf courses also sustained damage. One course experienced significant damage at its club house, temporarily closing it. The hurricane destroyed a restaurant in Southampton and also damaged stands and roofs at sports facilities. The hurricane also damaged 850 government buildings, with several landmark buildings damaged. These included the House of Assembly, City Hall, Gibbs Hill Lighthouse, and the Somerset Cricket Club. St. George's Preparatory School was damaged by a tornado, as reported by nearby residents, with offices and five classrooms destroyed.

Fabian blew down thousands of trees across Bermuda, including hundred year-old cedars. Sediment and ocean debris killed organisms in Walsingham Pond, the deepest pond on the island. The hurricane also destroyed many of the island's indigenous plants. Fabian's waves washed over three of the four nesting islets for the endangered Bermuda petrel, destroying nine burrows and damaging the remaining nests. The hurricane also killed most of the common terns that lived on Bermuda, and wrecked 75% of the nesting sites for the white-tailed tropicbird. The hurricane also transported a year's worth of carbonate sediment from the Bermuda Pedestal into the deep ocean. The hurricane's passage led to an increase in phytoplankton across the Sargasso Sea.

=== Atlantic coast ===
Swells from the hurricane produced rip currents and heavy surf along the eastern North Carolina coastline. One man drowned near Cape Hatteras from the rip currents. In New York, 10 surfers required rescue from the Coast Guard due to 10 ft (3.0 m) waves from the hurricane. Three deaths were reported in the north Atlantic when a ship, The Pacific Attitude, sank south of Newfoundland in the Grand Banks due to wave heights estimated over 60 ft (18 m).

== Aftermath ==
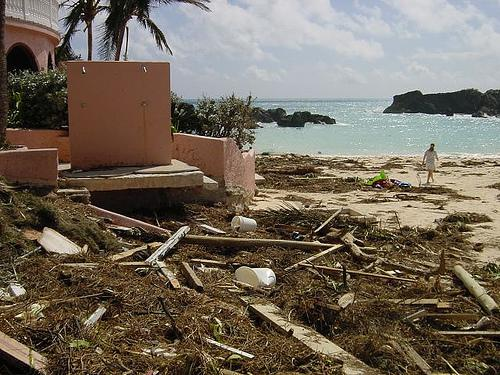
Hurricane damage in Bermuda

In the days after the storm, residents provided assistance for each other, especially for the elderly. Regiment soldiers and residents cleared roads with chainsaws. As a result of damage to their homes, dozens of people stayed in five shelters or undamaged hotels. On September 8, Bermuda's airport reopened to a limited capacity, allowing flights to resume. BELCO electricians worked 14–17 hour shifts to restore power, consisting of 41 linemen. Although the agency prepositioned supplies, a ship and a cargo flight delivered the required materials to finish restoration. On September 15, schools on the island reopened. Power on Bermuda was restored to all customers within three weeks of the hurricane. Days after the hurricane passed, moisture from Tropical Storm Henri resulted in thunderstorms and heavy rainfall; this hindered recovery efforts. Lack of power caused interruptions to communications. While an emergency broadcast station was installed and tested prior the hurricane, the hurricane caused a problem to the system's back-up generator. In October 2003, British Prince Edward visited the island to meet residents affected by Fabian, as well as survey storm damage.

The causeway in Bermuda remained closed for several days after the hurricane as road crews made temporary repairs. The bridge was fully reopened by October. After Fabian's passage, Bermuda had a labor shortage for both repairing roofs, as well as the cutting of limestone from local quarries that make up the roof material. Alternative roofing supplies required approval from the island's Department of Planning. Most buildings were repaired by January 2004. In February 2004, the American home improvement franchise, This Old House, renovated a home from 1805 in St. George's. It was only the second time that the franchise had worked outside of the United States. The damaged St. George's Preparatory School was partially reopened in March 2004, although it took two years to finish repairs. One of the damaged hotels reopened in April 2004, followed a month later by the other damaged hotel. To support family members of the storm victims, the September 5th Foundation was created, which held an annual memorial bike ride.

To help restore the island's trees, the South Carolina Maritime Heritage Foundation delivered 1,000 boxwood plants to the island, with support from a Boy Scout troop and nearby nurseries. Following damage to the Bermuda petrel's habitat, Bermuda's Department of Conservation carried out a program that moved their habitat to Nonsuch Island. A long-standing nature preserve, Nonsuch Island was higher and safer for the birds. By two years after the hurricane, the population numbers were higher than before the storm.

A memorial to the four Bermudians whose lives were claimed by Hurricane Fabian was erected near the Causeway's east end by the airport. The 10th anniversary of their deaths was remembered by government officials in September 2013. The onslaught of Hurricane Gonzalo in October 2014 prompted a catastrophe modeller to revisit Fabian's destruction, concluding that had it struck in 2014, it would have caused around $650 million in damage.

=== Retirement ===
Due to the storm damage and deaths in Bermuda, the World Meteorological Organization retired the name Fabian in the spring of 2004, and it will never again be used for a North Atlantic tropical cyclone. It was replaced with Fred for the 2009 season. The Bermuda Weather Service allowed residents to suggest a replacement name, with the only rule being the name had to be a male name beginning with the letter "F", able to be easily pronounced, and not currently in use by the National Hurricane Center. The service received a list of over 30 names, including Forrest and Frodo, after the character in The Lord of the Rings.

== See also ==
- Tropical cyclones in 2003
- Weather of 2003
- List of Bermuda hurricanes
- List of Category 4 Atlantic hurricanes
