= Sultana =

Sultana or Sultanah may refer to:

== Plants ==
- Sultana (grape), a "white" oval seedless grape variety
- A type of raisin

== Animals ==
- Sultana (gastropod), a genus of air-breathing land snails
- Western swamphen (also sultana bird), a "swamp hen" in the rail family Rallidae

== People ==
- Sultana (title), a female royal title, and a feminine form of the word sultan
- Sultana (actress), one of the earliest film actresses from India
- Sultana bint Turki Al Sudairi, spouse of Saudi King Salman
- Sultana Frizell (born 1984), Canadian track and field athlete
- Sultana Kamal (activist) (born 1950), Bangladeshi lawyer and human rights activist
- Sultana Kamal (athlete) (1952–1975), Bangladeshi athlete
- Sultana Meher (born 1938), Bangladeshi writer
- Sultana Zaman (1935–2012), Bangladeshi film actress and producer
- Sultana Zaman (psychologist) (1932–2020), Bangladeshi psychologist, academic, and philanthropist
- Anjana Sultana (1965–2025), Bangladeshi film actress
- Farhana Sultana, Bangladeshi environmental scientist
- Gouher Sultana (born 1988), Indian cricketer
- Parveen Sultana (born 1950), Indian Hindustani classical singer
- Stefan Sultana (born 1968), Maltese professional footballer
- Tash Sultana, Australian singer-songwriter
- Zarah Sultana, British Your Party MP for Coventry South since 2019

== Places ==
- Sultana, Rajasthan, India
- Sultana, a village in Mânăstirea, Romania
- Sultanah, Saudi Arabia
- Sultana, California, United States
- Sultana Point, a headland near the south east tip of Yorke Peninsula in South Australia
  - Sultana Point, South Australia, a locality
- Mount Foraker (Sultana), a mountain in Denali National Park, Alaska, United States

== Media ==
- Sultana, a 1988 novel by Jordanian novelist Ghalib Halasa
- "Sultana", a song from the early 1970s by the Norwegian band Titanic
- The Sultana, a lost 1916 silent film crime drama
- Sultana (film), a 1934 Hindi/Urdu film

== Ships ==
- Sultana, the flagship of Ali Pasha during the 1571 Battle of Lepanto
- HMS Sultana
  - HMS Sultana (1768), a small Royal Navy schooner
  - HMS Sultana (1780), a small Royal Navy cutter
- Sultana (1787 ship), an English Merchant ship
- Sultana (steamboat), destroyed in 1865 in the worst maritime disaster in US history
- USS Sultana, a yacht acquired by the U.S. Navy in World War I
- La Sultana, a yacht

== Other ==
- Sultana (bus), a brand of bus manufactured by Grupo Industrial Ramirez

== See also ==
- Sultan (disambiguation)
- Sultane (disambiguation)
- Sultanabad (disambiguation)
- Razia Sultana (disambiguation)
- Sultana Daku (disambiguation)
