= Sultana (ship) =

Several vessels have been named Sultana for the female royal title Sultana.

- Sultana, the flagship of Ali Pasha during the 1571 Battle of Lepanto
- Sultana (1787 ship) was launched in 1787 or 1788, at Yarmouth. She traded with the Mediterranean and the West Indies. A French privateer captured her in April 1799. She quickly returned to British ownership, but was recaptured again in 1801 returning to Britain from Halifax, Nova Scotia.
- Sultana (1833 ship), of 312 tons (bm), armed with 14 cannon, was built in the Bombay Dockyard in 1833 for the Sultan of Oman. He sent her to the United States on what turned out to be a three-month friendship visit to New York. She left Oman on 23 December 1839, touched at Zanzibar and Saint Helena, and arrived at New York on 30 April 1840. She left New York on 7 August and arrived at Zanzibar on 8 December. In 1842 she visited London bearing gifts from Sultan Saeed bin Sultan to Queen Victoria on the occasion of her coronation.
- Sultana, a British cargo ship wrecked off the coast off Yorke Peninsula in South Australia in 1849, after which Sultana Point was named
- Sultana (1854 ship), of 775 tons, was built at Sunderland. She made one voyage transporting convicts to Western Australia. Henry Richardson, master, sailed from Plymouth, England on 29 May 1859 bound for the Swan River Colony. She arrived at Fremantle on 19 August 1859. She had embarked 224 male convicts, all of whom survived the voyage. She also carried 142 migrants and other passengers.
- Sultana, a British ship which was wrecked in Guichen Bay, South Australia, in May 1857, nearby and in the same year as the Dutch ship Koning Willem de Tweede
- Sultana (steamboat), was destroyed in 1865 in the worst maritime disaster in US history.

== See also ==
- HMS Sultana – one of three, and possibly five, vessels of the Royal Navy
  - HMS Sultana (1768), a small Royal Navy schooner
  - HMS Sultana (1780), a small Royal Navy cutter
- USS Sultana (SP-134), a yacht acquired by the U.S. Navy in World War I
