= Sultane =

Sultane or La Sultane may refer to:

- Sultane, the French word for Sultana (title), a royal title
- French submarine Sultane, also written La Sultane, more than one submarine of the French Navy
- La Sultane, an 1871 painting by Édouard Manet, also known in English as Young Woman in Oriental Garb or Young Woman in Oriental Costume

== See also ==
- Sultana (disambiguation)
- La Sultana, a yacht
