= Sultana Point =

Sultana Point South Australia
- Coordinates: 35°6′50″S 137°45′34″E

Sultana Point is a headland in the Australian state of South Australia located near the south east tip of Yorke Peninsula in the gazetted locality of Sultana Point about 3.3 kilometres (2.1 miles) south-southeast of the town of Edithburgh. The waters to its immediate east contain the shoal system known as the Troubridge Shoals. It is one of the natural features named after the Sultana, a ship which was wrecked on the Troubridge Shoals on 28 September 1849. The waters adjoining its shores are located within the boundaries of the Lower Yorke Peninsula Marine Park.

== See also ==
- Sultana (disambiguation)
