= Pomiferin =

Names
- IUPAC name 3′,4′,5-Trihydroxy-6′′,6′′-dimethyl-6-(3-methylbut-2-en-1-yl)-6′′H-pyrano[2′′,3′′:7,8]isoflavone
- Systematic IUPAC name 3-(3,4-Dihydroxyphenyl)-5-hydroxy-8,8-dimethyl-6-(3-methylbut-2-en-1-yl)-4H,8H-(benzo[1,2-b:3,4-b′]dipyran)-4-one
- Other names Pomiferin

Identifiers
CAS Number	572-03-2
3D model (JSmol)	Interactive image
ChemSpider	4705
PubChem CID	4871 CID: 4871
UNII	74YIS40APM
CompTox Dashboard (EPA)	DTXSID00205831
- InChI: InChI=1S/C25H24O6/c1-13(2)5-7-15-21(28)20-22(29)17(14-6-8-18(26)19(27)11-14)12-30-24(20)16-9-10-25(3,4)31-23(15)16/h5-6,8-12,26-28H,7H2,1-4H3 Key: GHCZYXUOYFOXIP-UHFFFAOYSA-N; InChI=1/C25H24O6/c1-13(2)5-7-15-21(28)20-22(29)17(14-6-8-18(26)19(27)11-14)12-30-24(20)16-9-10-25(3,4)31-23(15)16/h5-6,8-12,26-28H,7H2,1-4H3 Key: GHCZYXUOYFOXIP-UHFFFAOYAP
- SMILES: CC(=CCc1c(c2c(=O)c(coc2c3c1OC(C=C3)(C)C)c4ccc(c(c4)O)O)O)C

Properties
Chemical formula	C_{25}H_{24}O_{6}
Molar mass	420.461 g·mol^{−1}
Density	1.314 g/cm^{3}
Solubility in DMSO, acetone	Soluble

Hazards
Flash point	233.3 °C
- Except where otherwise noted, data are given for materials in their standard state (at 25 °C [77 °F], 100 kPa). Infobox references

Pomiferin is a prenylated isoflavone that can be found along with osajin in the fruits and female flowers of the osage orange tree (Maclura pomifera).

Pomiferin was identified and named in 1939 by Melville L. Wolfrom from Ohio State University. In 1941, Wolfram classified pomiferin as an isoflavone and in 1946 published the complete structure of pomiferin. In 2003, the crystal structure of pomiferin was reported by J. Marek.

In recent research pomiferin has demonstrated efficacy as an antioxidant, cardioprotectant, antimicrobial, antidiabetic, PDE5 inhibitor, and cytotoxicity for several cancer cell lines.

== Research ==
=== Repellent ===
Peterson and Fristad (2000) investigated folklore beliefs stating that osage orange fruit repelled insects. They concluded that pure pomiferin had little or no effect and that there must be another component of the Osage orange that repels insects.

=== Antioxidant ===
Pomiferin has shown antioxidant activity via inhibition of lipid peroxidation and the reduction of free radicals, reactive oxygen species and other unstable molecules. Tsao and Yang (2003) reported that Pomiferin was found to be a strong antioxidant, comparable to the vitamins C and E and the synthetic antioxidant BHT.

=== Cardioprotectant ===
Necas and Bartosíková (2007) reported that the chemical had potent cardioprotective effect on rat hearts subjected to ischemia and reperfusion injury. The mechanism for this protection may occur through the inhibition of lipid peroxidation.

=== Antimicrobial ===
Mahmoud (1981) indicated that pomiferin exhibited antibacterial activity against E. coli and Salmonella gallinarum, as well as Mycobacterium smegmatis to a lesser extent.

=== Antidiabetic ===
Bartosíková and Necas (2007), furthermore, conducted a biochemical examination showing antioxidative and antidiabetic effects of pomiferin.

Moon (2014) presented results of a study that evaluated the antidiabetic effect of osajin and pomiferin from the Osage orange in normal and streptozotocin-induced diabetic rats. Pomiferin in the streptozotocin-induced diabetic rats resulted in significant hypoglycemic activity for 14 days following, by decreasing the serum glucose and triglycerides while increasing serum insulin in those rats.

=== PDE5 inhibitor ===
Ribaudo (2015) proposed pomiferin and osajin as potential lead compounds for the development, starting from natural scaffolds, of a new class of PDE-5A inhibitors with vasorelaxant properties to treat pulmonary hypertension and erectile dysfunction.

=== Anti-cancer activity ===
Svasti (2005) observed that pomiferin induced apoptosis and differentiation in cholangiocarcinoma cell line HuCCA-1, albeit at the therapeutically unrealistic dose of 0.9 μg/mL.
