= HMS Sultana =

Three, and possibly five, vessels of the Royal Navy have borne the name HMS Sultana, for a female sultan or wife of a sultan:

- HMS Sultana (1768) was an American schooner built in 1767 that the Royal Navy bought in 1768 and sold in 1772.
- HMS Sultana (1780) was a mercantile cutter that the Royal Navy bought in 1780 and sold in 1799.
- HMS Sultana (1855) was a wood paddle tug that the Royal Navy bought at Constantinople in 1855.

In addition, there is mention in records of two other Royal Navy vessels by the same name that may have been tenders to larger vessels.

- In 1776, there is an HMS Sultana mentioned on the North America station, under the command of a "C. Hope". She was sold in 1780.
- There was a Sultana mentioned as serving off Egypt between 8 March to 2 September 1801 and under the command of Lieutenant John Moon. She is listed amongst the vessels whose crews qualified for the Naval General Service Medal with clasp "Egypt".

== See also ==
- HMS Sultan (disambiguation)
- French frigate Sultane - captured in 1814 and became HMS Sultane
