= Sultana Daku 1920 Revolt =

Armed rebellion led by dacoit Sultana in British India, 1920

Sultana Daku's 1920 Revolt
- Part of Resistance against British Raj
Date	1920
Location	Rohilkhand region, United Provinces, British India (present-day Uttar Pradesh)
Result	Revolt suppressed by British police Sultana captured and executed

Belligerents
Dacoit gangs under Sultana	British colonial police

Commanders and leaders
Sultana Daku	F.W. Champion, British Forest Officer

Strength
Dozens of armed followers	British police and forest officials

Casualties and losses
Unknown	Many police injured or killed

Sultana Daku's 1920 Revolt was a small but symbolic armed uprising in the Rohilkhand region of the United Provinces of Agra and Oudh (now in Uttar Pradesh) led by the dacoit Sultana Daku. The rebellion happened during a period of rising discontent against British colonial rule in India.

== Background ==
Sultana Daku, a leader of the Bhantu tribe, operated in the dense forests near Pilibhit and Bareilly. His actions were seen as criminal by the colonial government.

== See also ==
- Sultana Daku (disambiguation)
- Indian independence movement
- The Confession of Sultana Daku
