= Larinda =

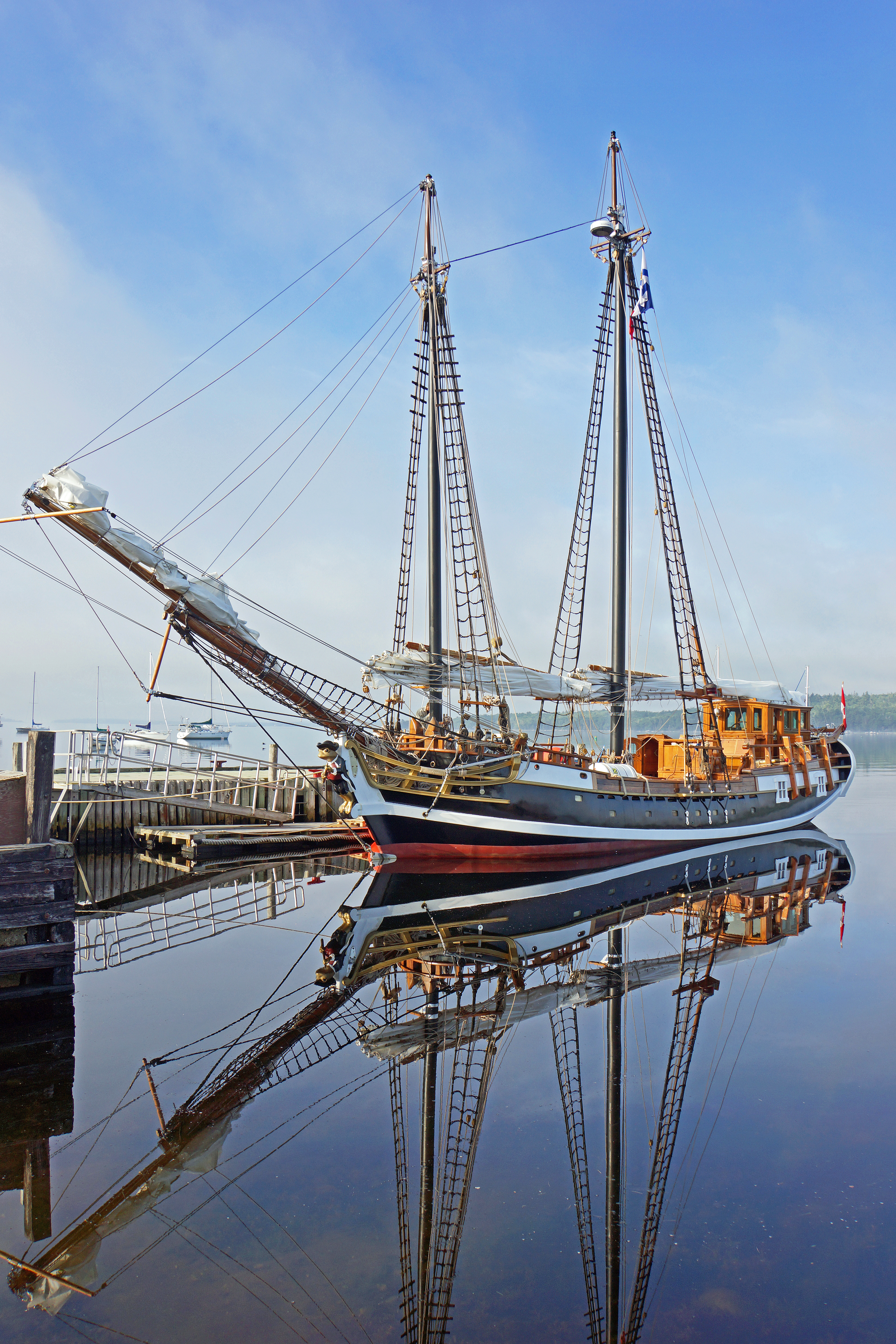
- Larinda in 2012, Shelburne, Nova Scotia

History

United States
- Name: Larinda
- Laid down: 1970
- Launched: 1996
- Fate: Sunk and raised in 2003; Active

General characteristics 1996
- Length: 86 ft (26 m)
- Beam: 16.5 ft (5.0 m)
- Draft: 8 ft (2.4 m)

The Larinda is a recreational schooner inspired by the 1767 Boston schooner HMS Sultana. It was built over a period of twenty-six years in the backyard of its owner and launched in 1996. It sank during Hurricane Juan on September 29, 2003, was raised a month later and eventually returned to service.

== History ==
The idea for a ship originated when owner and creator Larry Mahan was in the fourth grade. His dream was to build the biggest ship on Cape Cod. In 1970 at his new house in Marstons Mills, he began construction. Over the next 26 years, the ship was built by over 1,000 volunteers. The ship is 86 feet (26 m) long with a specialized reinforced concrete hull. 2,800 square feet (260 m^{2}) of red sail are also utilized. The figurehead is carved from a 100-year-old cypress tree. While the hull was inspired by the lines of the 1767 schooner Sultana, Larinda has a Chinese junk rig, a different deck layout and whimsical ornamental carvings not found on the 1767 schooner, notably a figurehead of a frog holding a telescope.

The schooner was launched in 1996. It was moved from its home to the launching point in Falmouth, Massachusetts. Prior to its sinking, Larinda visited 19 states, seven foreign countries, served as a goodwill ambassador to Cuba, sailed alongside the USS Constitution, and was part of Boston's Tall Ships 2000. In 1999, the Mahans sold their house to be with the ship permanently.

On September 28, 2003, the schooner was at Halifax Harbour at the Maritime Museum of the Atlantic preparing to sail to Lunenburg, Nova Scotia, and then home to Cape Cod when Hurricane Juan struck. Larinda was moored north of the corvette HMCS Sackville when the corvette broke loose and rammed the schooner. According to the Canadian Coast Guard, winds reached up to 140 kilometres per hour (87 mph). The schooner took on large amounts of water and sank just after the hurricane ended early on September 29. The sinking took place so quickly that only a few documents were saved, although all of the crew escaped unharmed. The schooner was raised by a crane and barge on October 17, 2003. However the schooner was badly contaminated by harbour sewage. Mahan was unable to afford repairs and decontamination and was forced to sell Larinda. Larinda was purchased by Arthur Scott and Charlene Corkum of St. Margaret's Bay, Nova Scotia who completed repairs and now use the schooner to promote a cottage and restaurant complex. The Mahan family sued Sackville's owners, the Naval Memorial Trust in 2009 for $815,000 but the Nova Scotia Supreme Court dismissed the case on August 4, 2011, concluding that the Trust had taken all necessary and appropriate precautions to secure Sackville.
