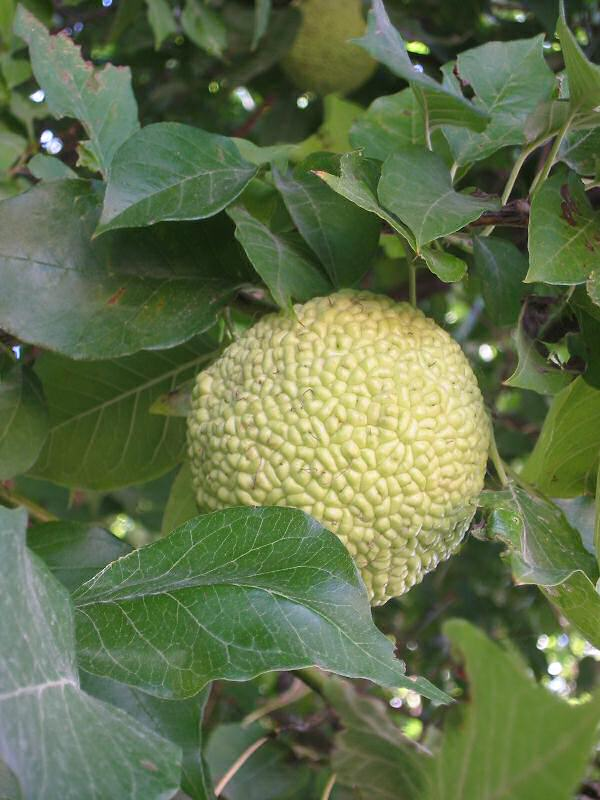
- Foliage and multiple fruit

Conservation status
- Least Concern (IUCN 3.1)

- Secure (NatureServe)

Scientific classification
- Kingdom: Plantae
- Clade: Tracheophytes
- Clade: Angiosperms
- Clade: Eudicots
- Clade: Rosids
- Order: Rosales
- Family: Moraceae
- Genus: Maclura
- Species: M. pomifera

Binomial name
- Maclura pomifera (Raf.) C.K.Schneid.

Synonyms
- Ioxylon pomiferum Raf.; Maclura aurantiaca Nutt.; Maclura pomifera f. inermis (André) Schelle; Maclura pomifera var. inermis (André) C.K.Schneid.; Myroxylon abruptifolium Stokes; Toxylon aurantiacum (Nutt.) Raf.; Toxylon maclura Raf.; Toxylon pomiferum (Raf.) Sarg.

= Maclura pomifera =

Osage orange

Plant species in the fig family

Maclura pomifera, commonly known as the Osage orange (/ˈoʊseɪdʒ/ OH-sayj), is a small deciduous tree or large shrub, native to the south-central United States. It is a member of the mulberry family, Moraceae. It typically grows about 8 to 15 m (30–50 ft) tall. The distinctive multiple fruit resembles an immature orange, is roughly spherical, bumpy, 8 to 15 cm (3–6 in) in diameter, and turns bright yellow-green in the fall. The fruit excretes a sticky white latex when cut or damaged. Despite the name "Osage orange", it is not related to the orange.

Due to its latex secretions and woody pulp, the fruit is not usually eaten by humans and rarely by foraging animals. Ecologists Daniel H. Janzen and Paul S. Martin proposed in 1982 that the fruit of this species might be an example of what has come to be called an evolutionary anachronism—that is, a fruit coevolved with a large animal seed dispersal partner that is now extinct. This hypothesis is controversial.

Maclura pomifera has many common names, including mock orange, horse apple, and hedge apple. The name bois d'arc (French, meaning "bow-wood") has also been corrupted into bodark and bodock.

== History ==
The earliest account of the tree in the English language was given by William Dunbar, a Scottish explorer, in his narrative of a journey made in 1804 from St. Catherine's Landing on the Mississippi River to the Ouachita River. Meriwether Lewis sent some slips and cuttings of the curiosity to President Thomas Jefferson in March 1804. According to Lewis's letter, the samples were donated by "Mr. Peter Choteau, who resided the greater portion of his time for many years with the Osage Nation". Those cuttings did not survive. In 1810, Bradbury relates that he found two M. pomifera trees growing in the garden of Pierre Chouteau, one of the first settlers of Saint Louis, apparently the same person.

American settlers used the Osage orange (i.e. "hedge apple") as a hedge to exclude free-range livestock from vegetable gardens and corn fields. Under severe pruning, the hedge apple sprouted abundant adventitious shoots from its base; as these shoots grew, they became interwoven and formed a dense, thorny barrier hedge. The thorny Osage orange tree was widely naturalized throughout the United States until this usage was superseded by the invention of barbed wire in 1874. By providing a barrier that was "horse-high, bull-strong, and pig-tight", Osage orange hedges provided the "crucial stop-gap measure for westward expansion until the introduction of barbed wire a few decades later".

The trees were named bois d'arc ("bow-wood") by early French settlers who observed the wood being used for war clubs and bow-making by Native Americans. Meriwether Lewis was told that the people of the Osage Nation, "So much ... esteem the wood of this tree for the purpose of making their bows, that they travel many hundreds of miles in quest of it." The trees are also known as "bodark", "bodarc", or "bodock" trees, most likely originating as a corruption of bois d'arc.

The Comanche also used this wood for their bows. They liked the wood because it was strong, flexible, and durable, and the bush/tree was common along river bottoms of the Comanchería. Some historians believe that the high value this wood had to Native Americans throughout North America for the making of bows, along with its small natural range, contributed to the great wealth of the Spiroan Mississippian culture that controlled all the land in which these trees grew.

=== Etymology ===
The genus Maclura is named in honor of William Maclure (1763–1840), a Scottish-born American geologist. The specific epithet pomifera means "fruit-bearing". The common name "Osage" derives from the Osage people, from whom young plants were first obtained, as told in the notes of Meriwether Lewis in 1804.

== Description ==
=== General habit ===
Mature trees range from 12 to 20 m (40 to 65 ft) tall with short trunks and round-topped canopies. The roots are thick, fleshy, and covered with bright orange bark. The tree's mature bark is dark, deeply furrowed, and scaly. The plant has significant potential to invade unmanaged habitats.

The wood of M. pomifera is golden to bright yellow, but fades to medium brown with ultraviolet light exposure. The wood is heavy, hard, strong, and flexible, capable of receiving a fine polish and very durable in contact with the ground. It has a specific gravity of 0.7736 or 773.6 kg/m^{3} (48.29 lb/cu ft).

=== Leaves and branches ===
Leaves are arranged alternately in a slender growing shoot 90 to 120 cm (3–4 ft) long. In form they are simple, a long oval terminating in a slender point. The leaves are 8 to 13 cm (3–5 in) long and 5 to 8 cm (2–3 in) wide, and are thick, firm, dark green, shining above, and paler green below when full grown. In autumn they turn bright yellow. The leaf axils contain formidable spines, which when mature, are about 2.5 cm (1 in) long.

Branchlets are at first bright green and pubescent; during their first winter, they become light brown tinged with orange, and later they become a paler orange-brown. Branches contain a yellow pith, and are armed with stout, straight, axillary spines. During the winter, the branches bear lateral buds that are depressed-globular, partly immersed in the bark, and pale chestnut brown in color.

=== Flowers and fruit ===
As a dioecious plant, the inconspicuous pistillate (female) and staminate (male) flowers are found on different trees. Staminate flowers are pale green, small, and arranged in racemes borne on long, slender, drooping peduncles developed from the axils of crowded leaves on the spur-like branchlets of the previous year. They feature a hairy, four-lobed calyx; the four stamens are inserted opposite the lobes of the calyx, on the margin of a thin disk. Pistillate flowers are borne in a dense, spherical, many-flowered head, which appears on a short, stout peduncle from the axils of the current year's growth. Each flower has a hairy, four-lobed calyx with thick, concave lobes that invest the ovary and enclose the fruit. Ovaries are superior, ovate, compressed, green, and crowned by a long slender style covered with white stigmatic hairs. The ovule is solitary.

The mature multiple fruit's size and general appearance resembles a large, yellow-green orange (the citrus fruit), about 10 to 13 cm (4–5 in) in diameter, with a roughened and tuberculated surface. The compound (or multiple) fruit is a syncarp of numerous small drupes, in which the carpels (ovaries) have grown together; thus, it is more precisely classified as a multiple-accessory fruit. Each small drupe is oblong, compressed, and rounded; it contains a milky latex that oozes when the fruit is damaged or cut. The seeds are oblong. Although the flowering is dioecious, the pistillate tree when isolated will still bear large oranges, visually perfect, but lacking the seeds. The fruit has a slightly cucumber-like flavor.

Falling fruit poses an injury risk to humans under the tree or to passing vehicles.

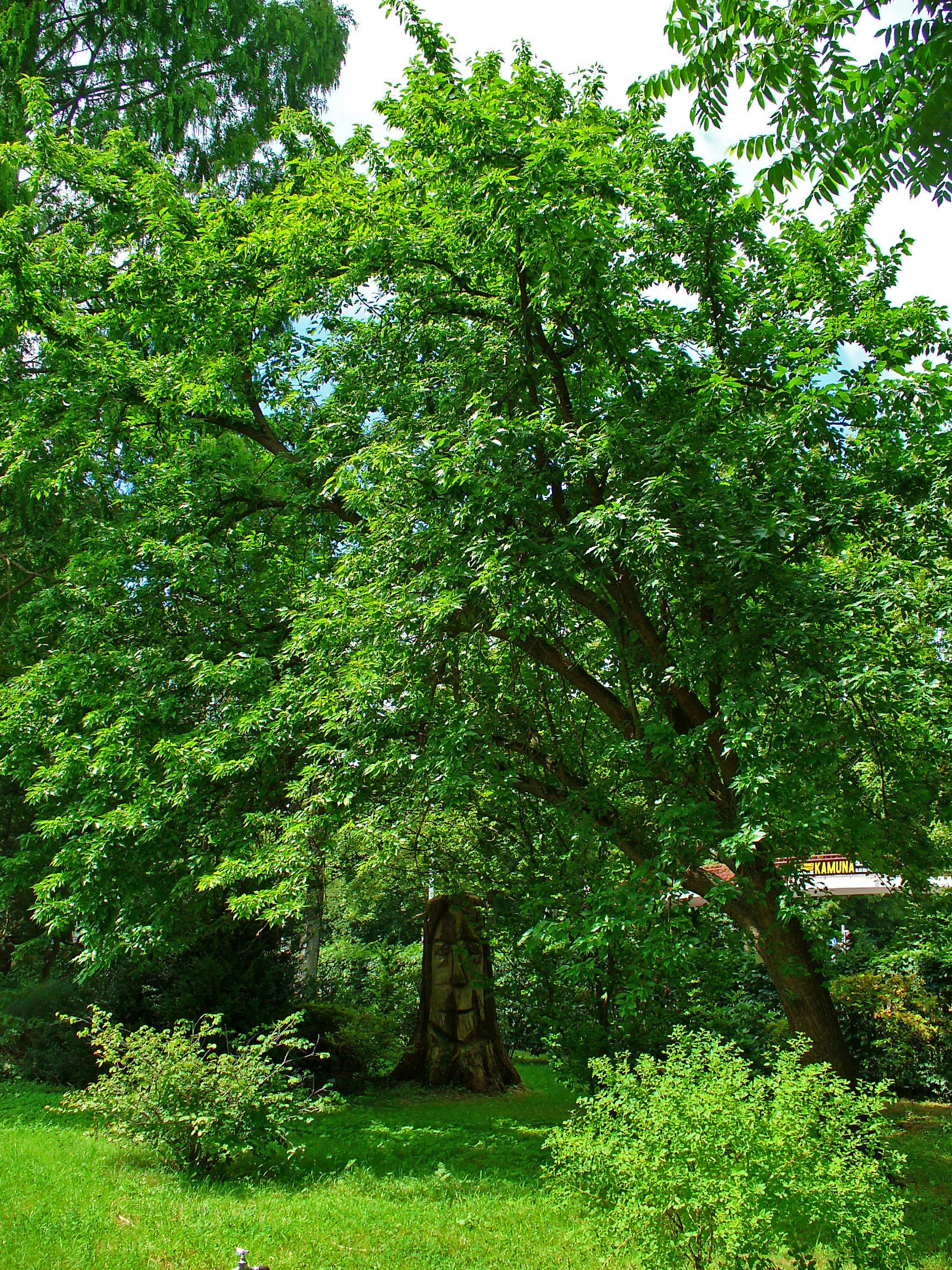
Mature tree

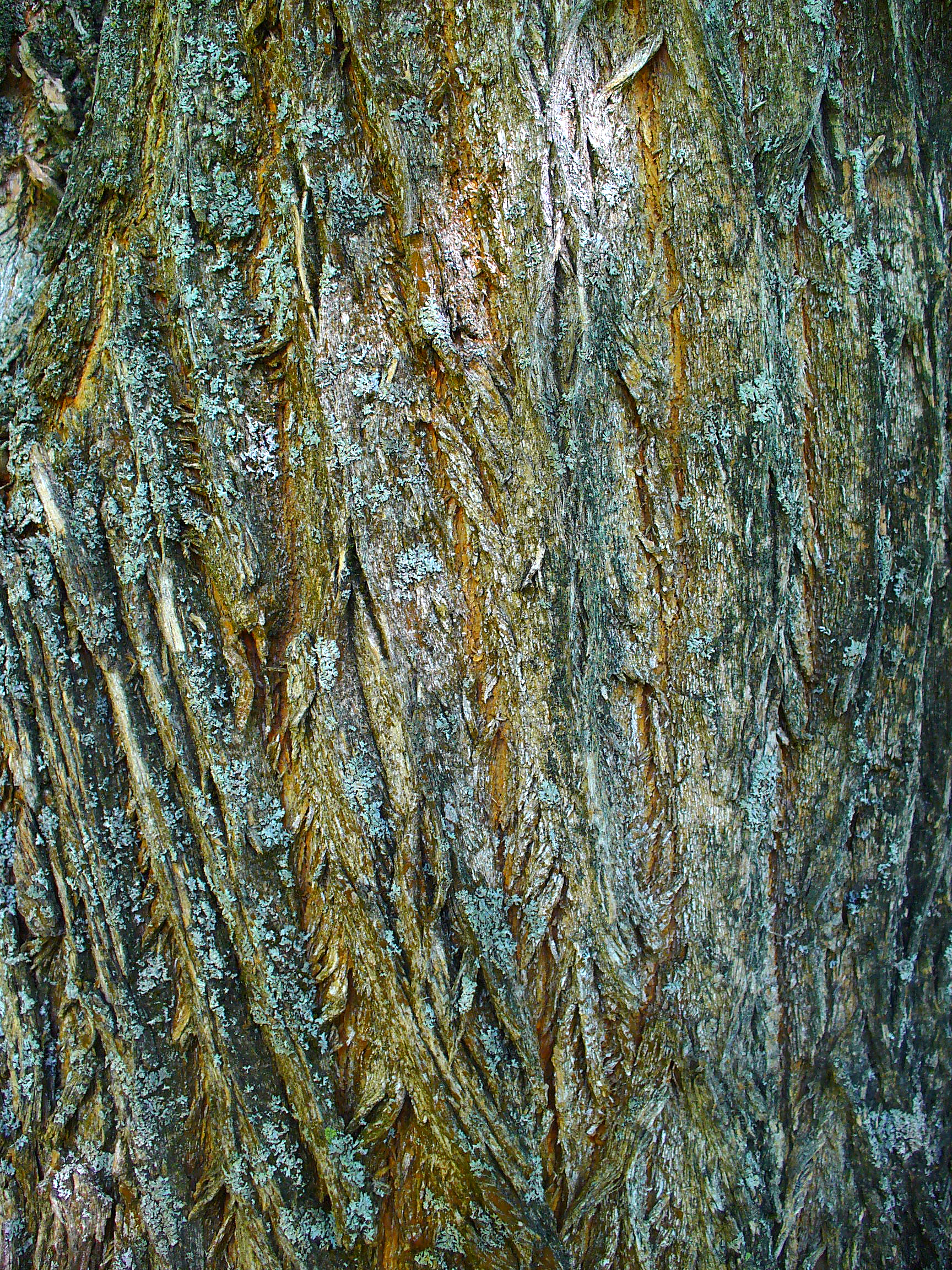
Mature bark

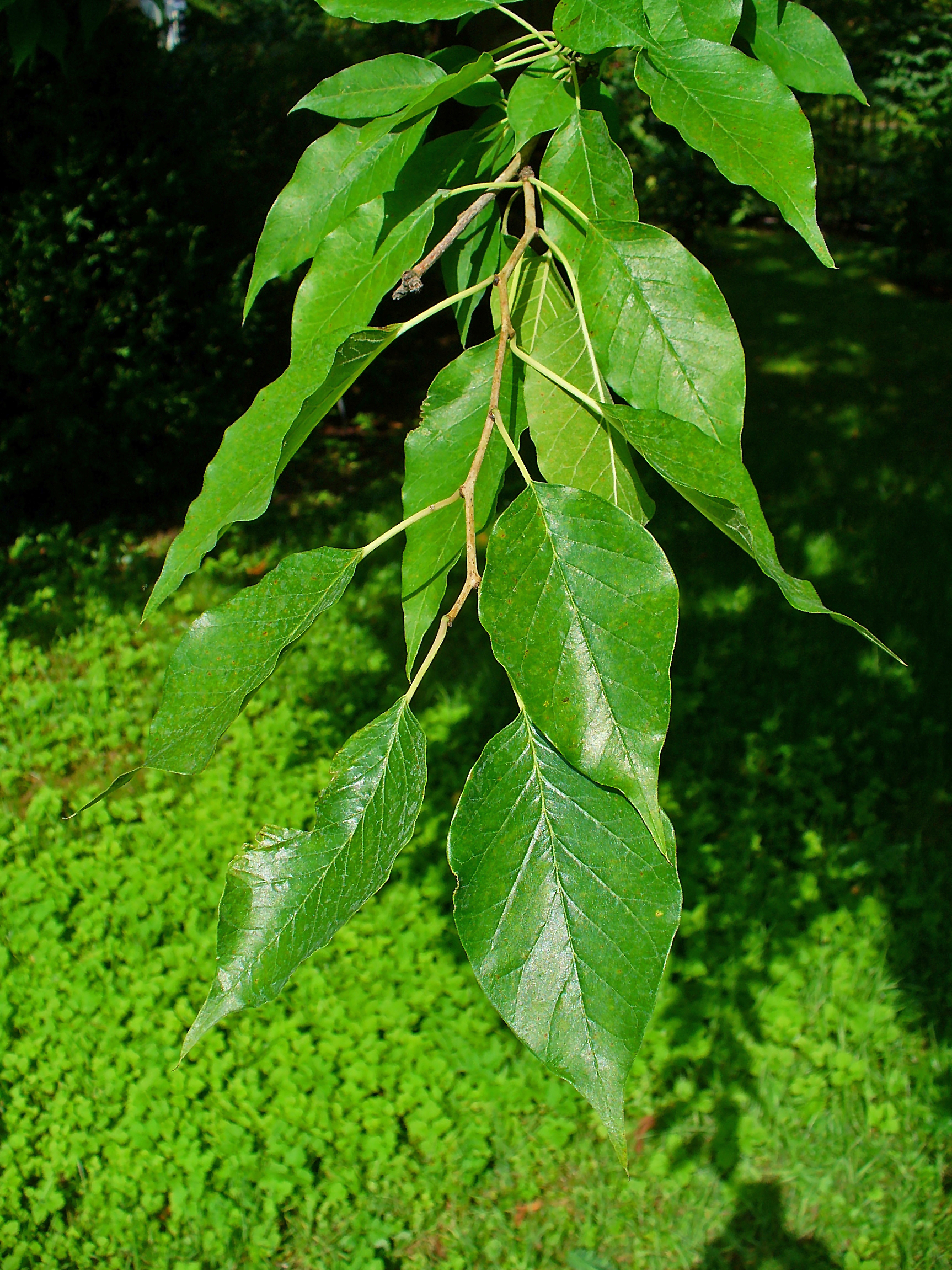
Leaves

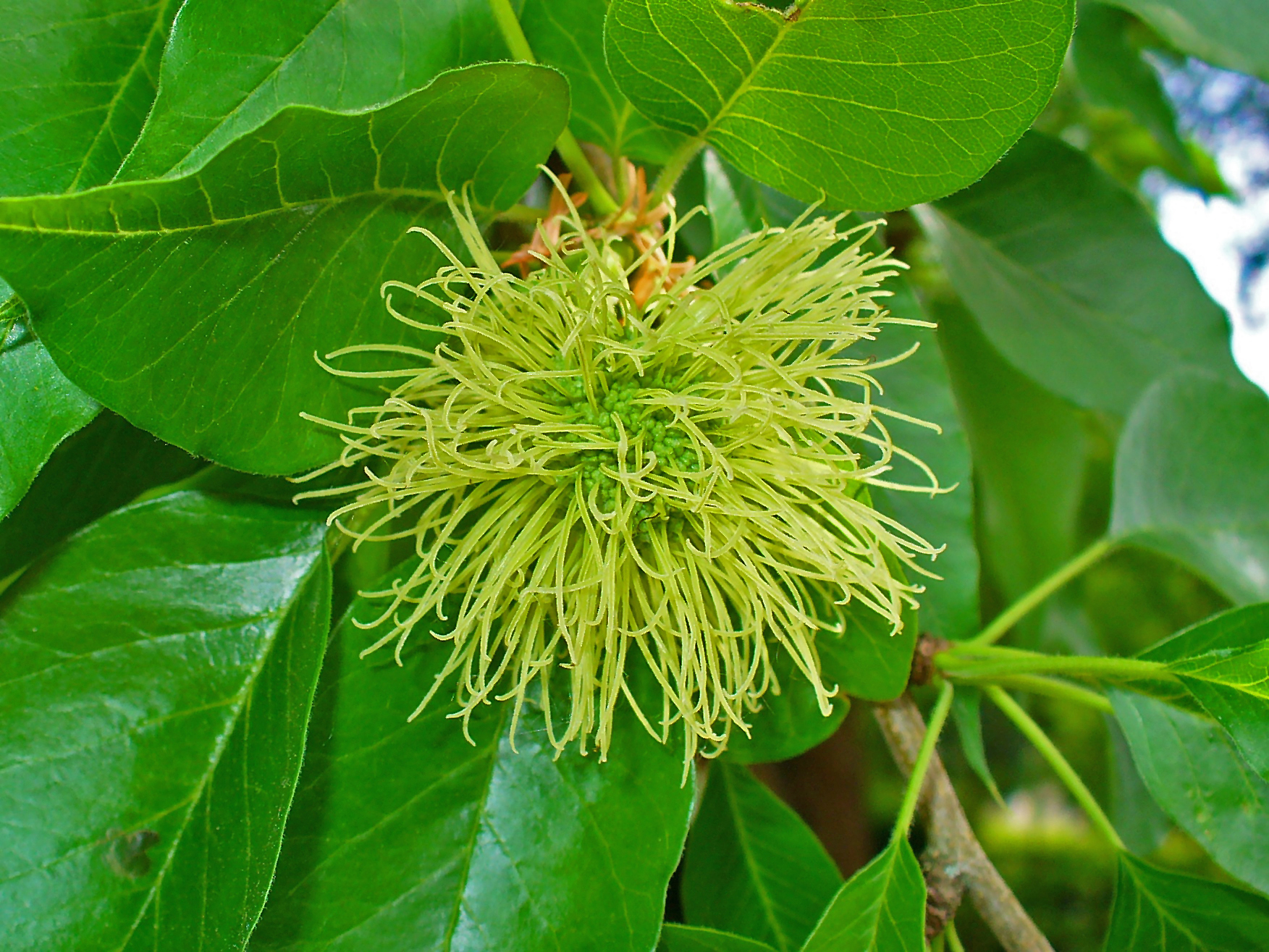
Female inflorescence

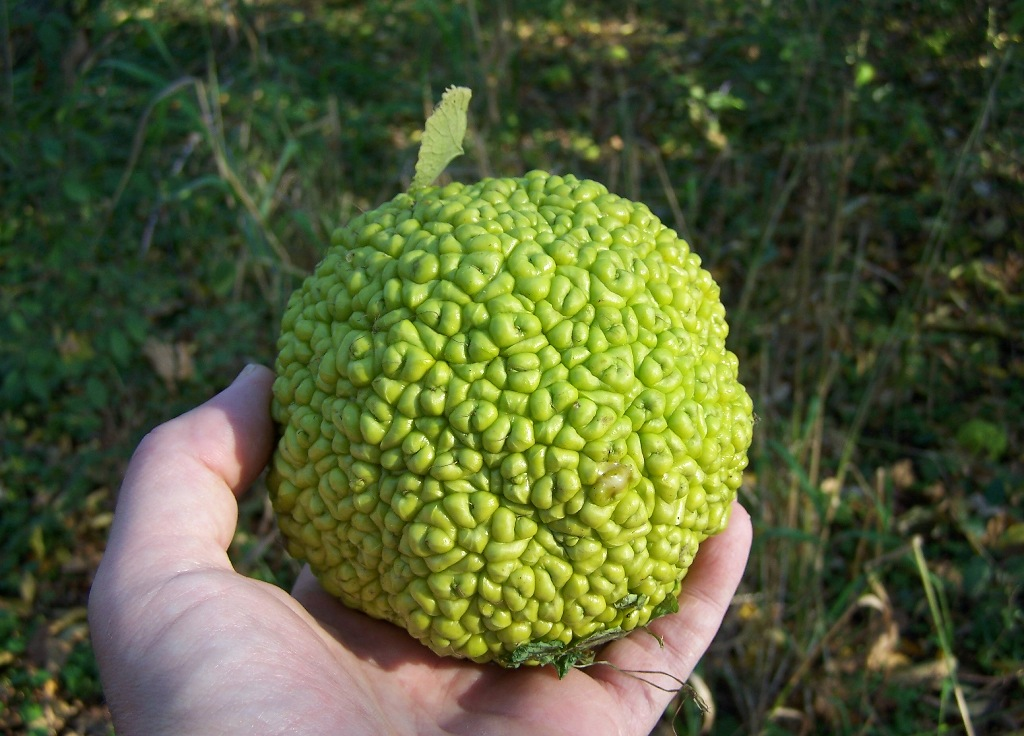
Mature multiple fruit

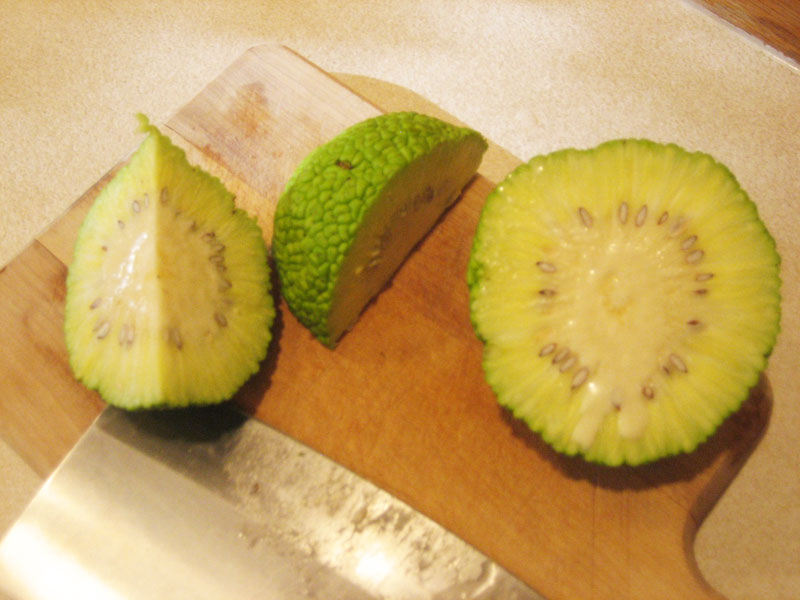
Multiple fruit, sliced

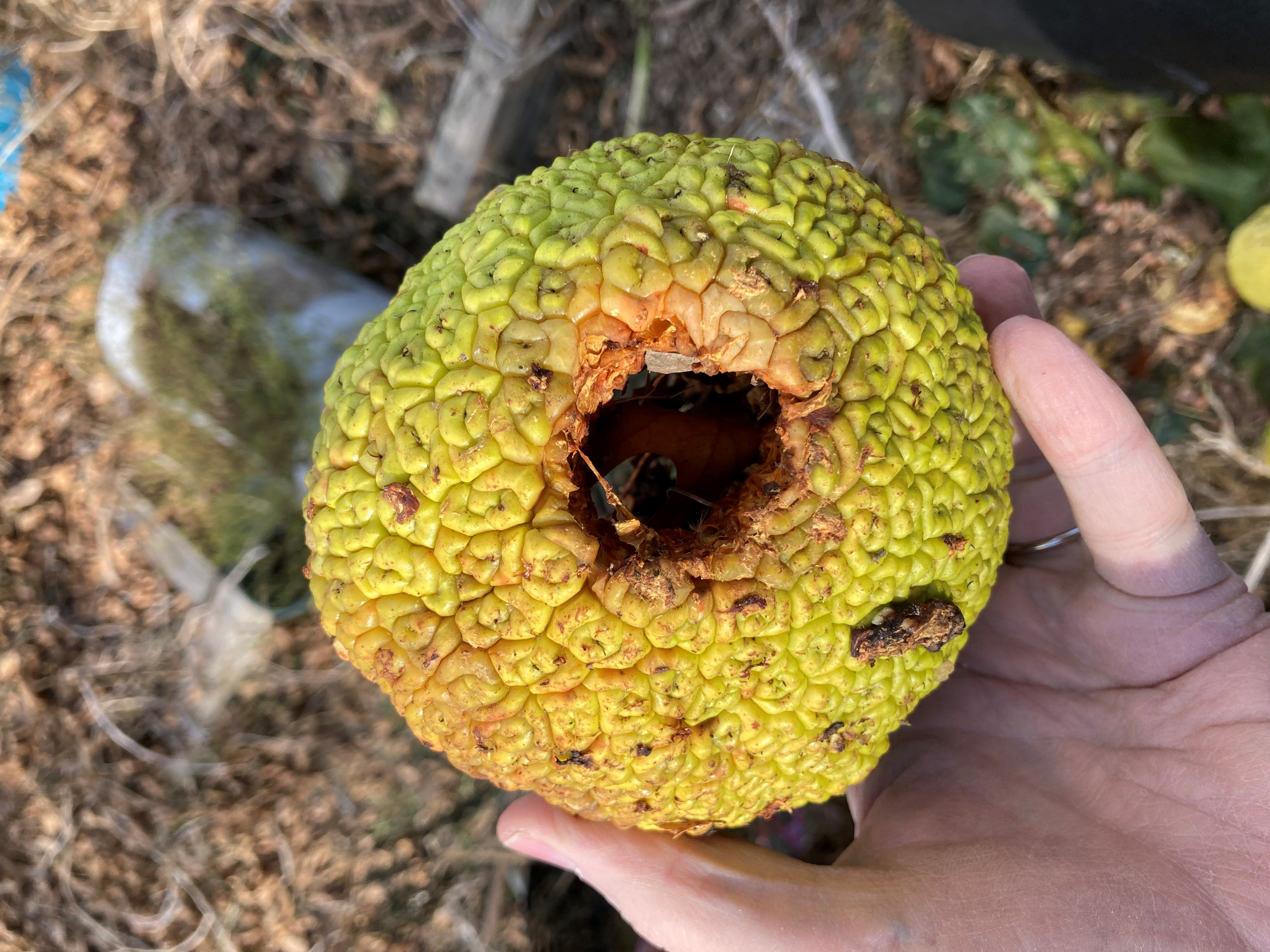
Fruit burrowed into by seed-eating animal

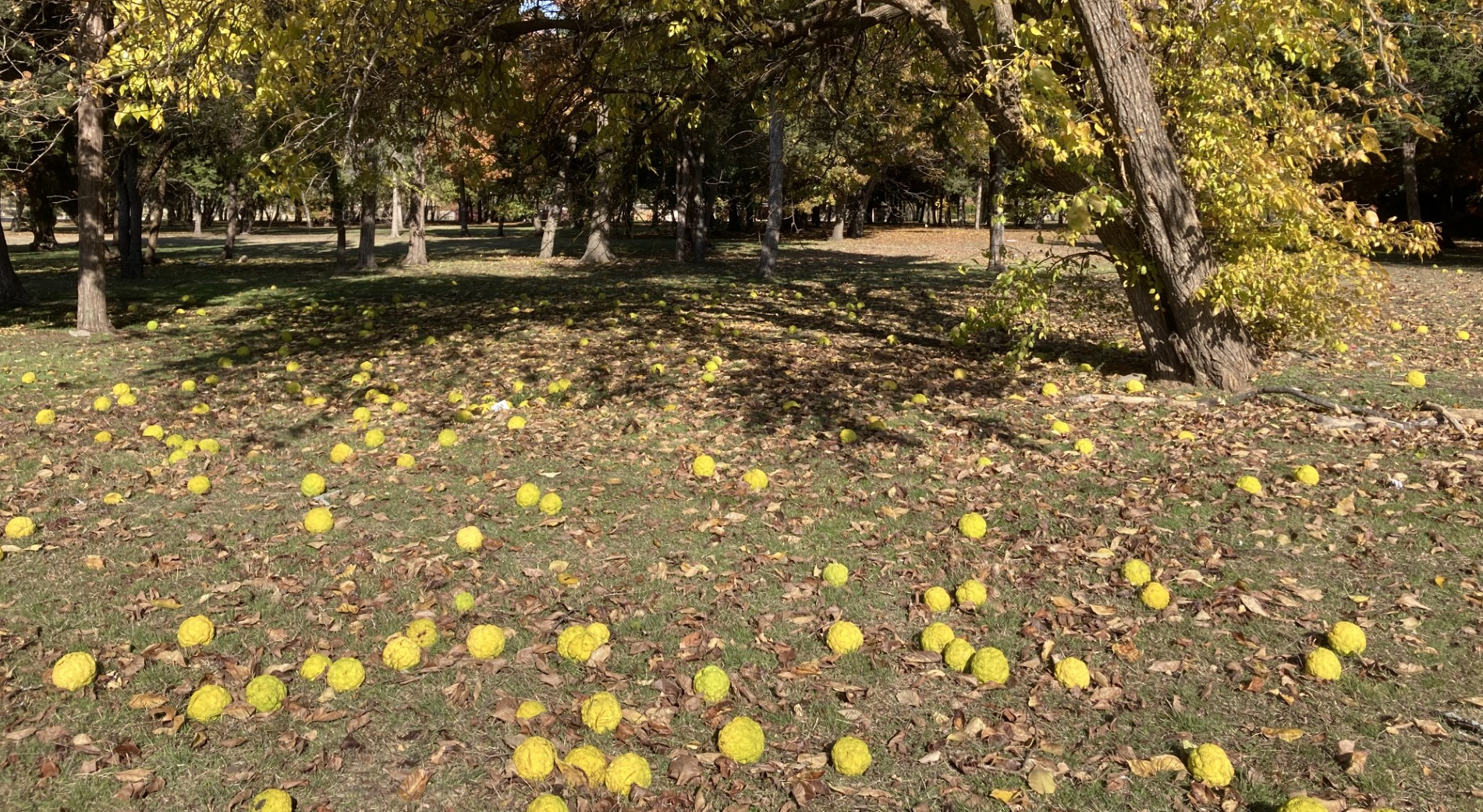
M. pomifera fruits on ground

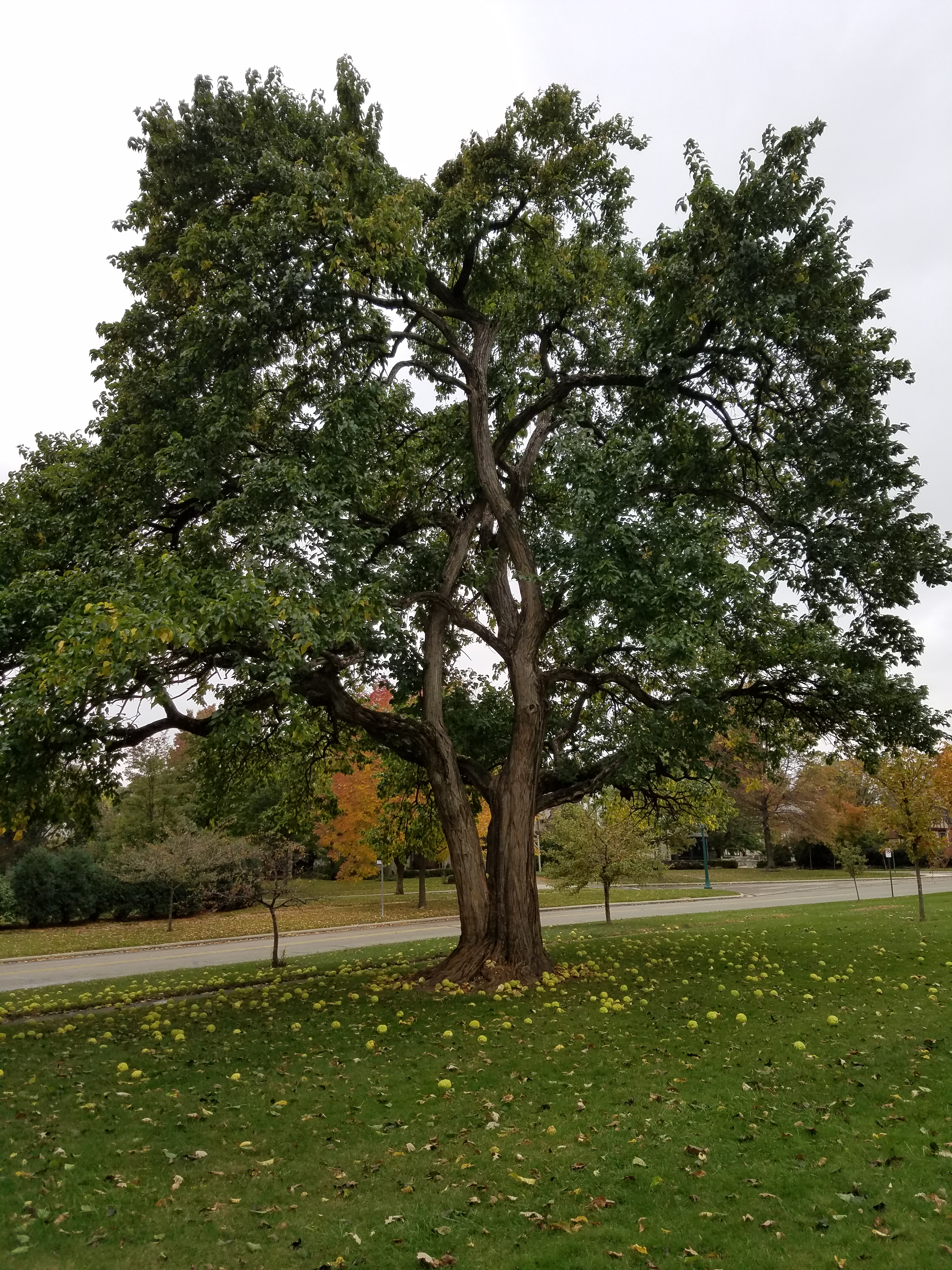
M. pomifera tree with fruits on ground

== Distribution ==
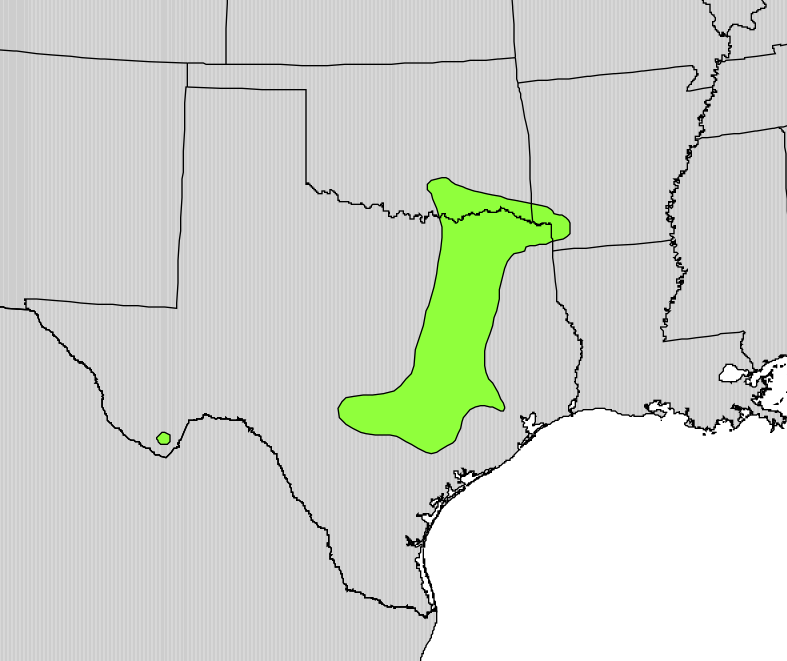
Natural range of M. pomifera in pre-Columbian era America

Osage orange's pre-Columbian range was largely restricted to a small area in what is now the United States, namely the Red River drainage of Oklahoma, Texas, and Arkansas, as well as the Blackland Prairies and post oak savannas. A disjunct population also occurred in the Chisos Mountains of Texas. It has since become widely naturalized in the United States and Ontario, Canada. Osage orange has been planted in all of the 48 contiguous states of the United States and in southeastern Canada.

The largest known Osage orange tree is located at the Patrick Henry National Memorial in Brookneal, Virginia, and is believed to be almost 350 years old. Another historic tree is located on the grounds of Fort Harrod, a Kentucky pioneer settlement in Harrodsburg, Kentucky.

The tree was transferred and planted in many parks in Europe. It is found in Bulgaria and Serbia.

=== Ecological aspects of historical distribution ===
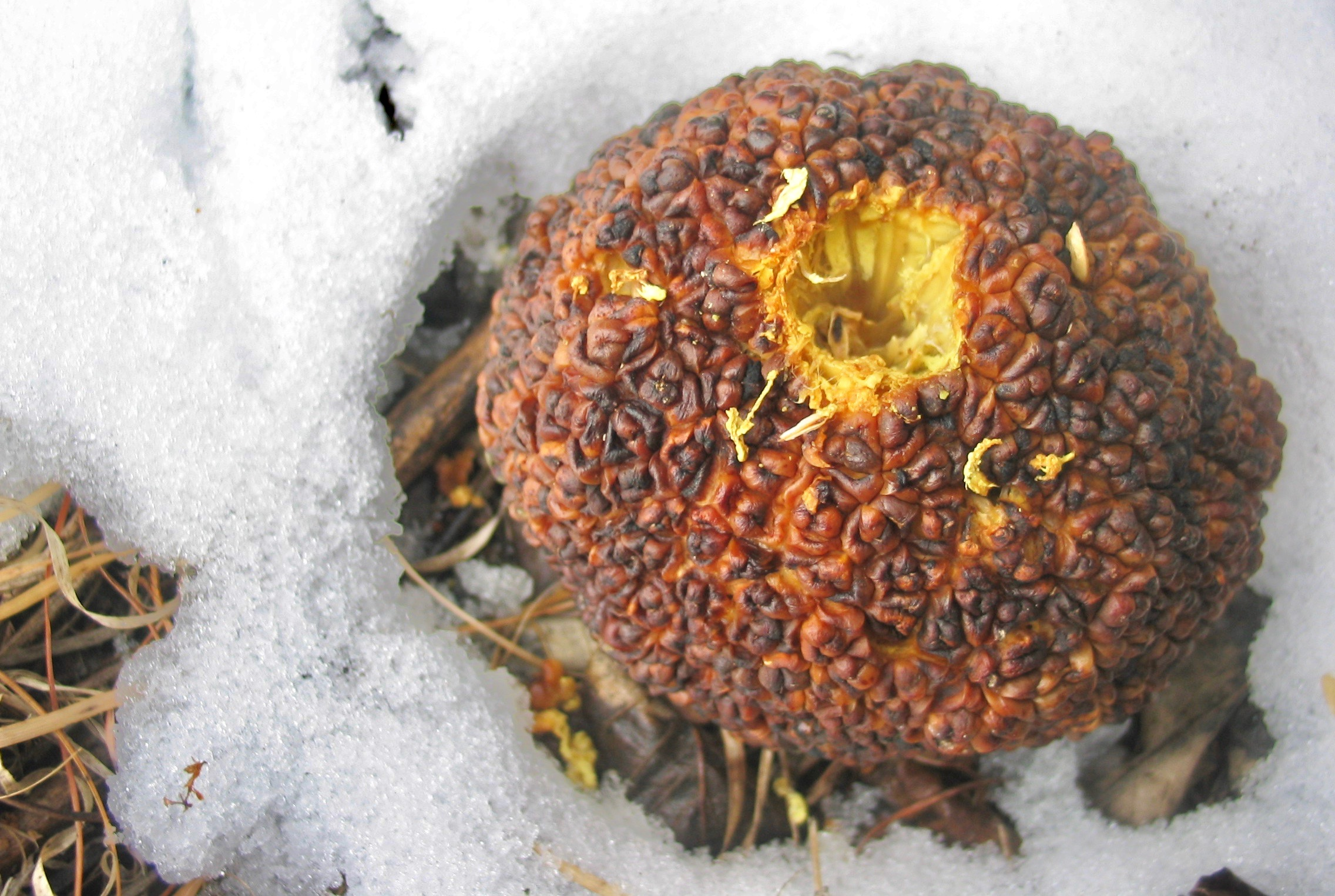
Evidence of a seed predator (February in Kansas).

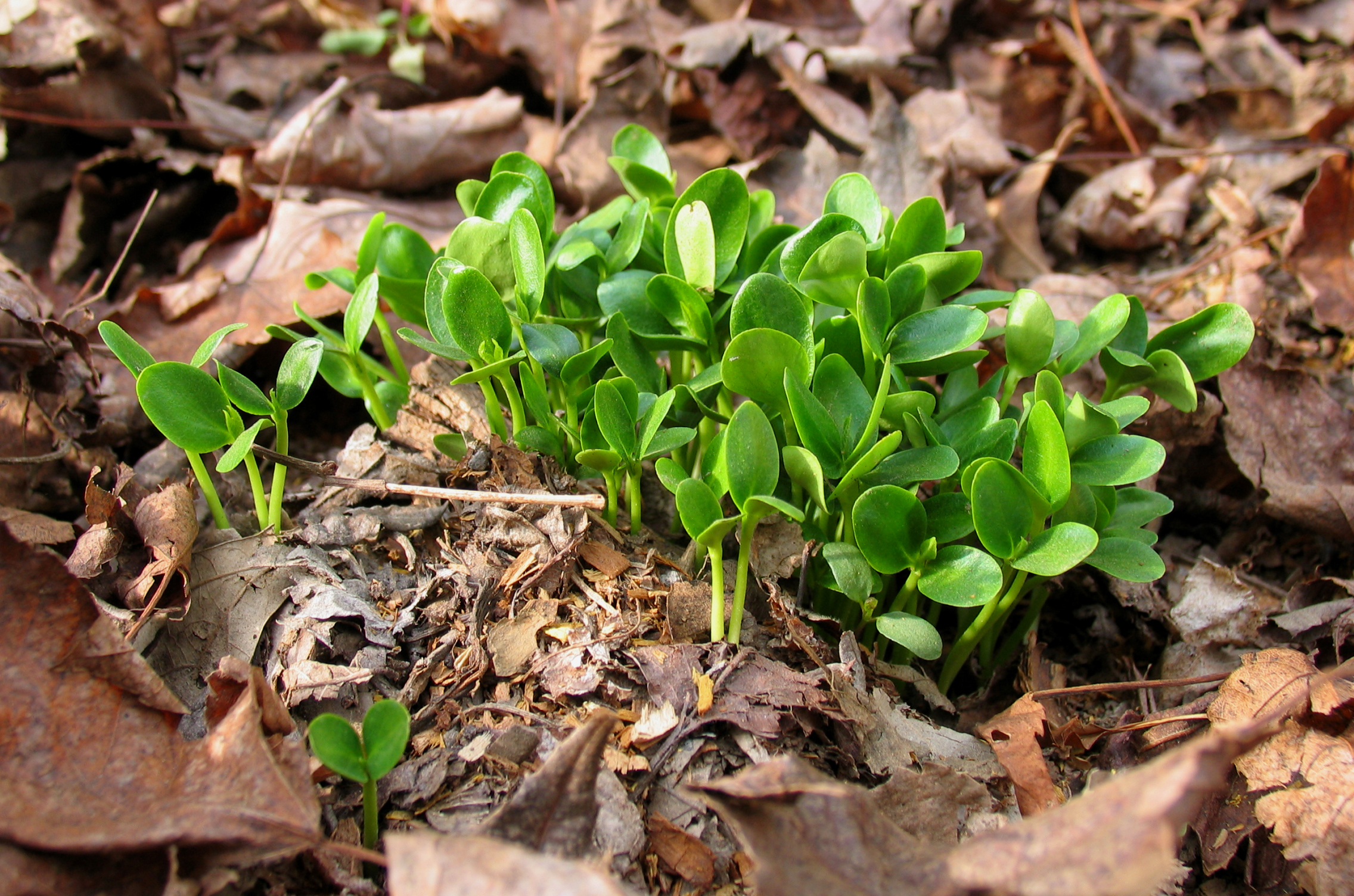
Mound of a single fallen fruit sprouting seeds (April in Illinois)

Because of the limited original range and lack of obvious effective means of propagation, the Osage orange has been the subject of controversial claims by some authors to be an evolutionary anachronism, whereby one or more now extinct Pleistocene megafauna, such as ground sloths, mammoths, mastodons, or gomphotheres, fed on the fruit and aided in seed dispersal. An equine species that became extinct at the same time also has been suggested as the plant's original dispersal agent because modern horses and other livestock sometimes eat the fruit. This hypothesis is controversial. For example, a 2015 study indicated that Osage orange seeds are not effectively spread by extant horse or elephant species, while a 2018 study concludes that squirrels are ineffective, short-distance seed dispersers. The claim has been criticized as a "just-so story" that lacks any empirical evidence.

The fruit is not poisonous to humans or livestock, but is not preferred by them, because it is mostly inedible due to its large size (about the diameter of a softball) and hard, dry texture. The edible seeds of the fruit are used by squirrels as food. Large animals such as livestock, which typically would consume fruits and disperse seeds, mainly ignore the fruit.

== Ecology ==
The fruits are consumed by black-tailed deer in Texas, and white-tailed deer and fox squirrels in the Midwest. Crossbills are said to peck the seeds out. Loggerhead shrikes, a declining species in much of North America, use the tree for nesting and cache prey items upon its thorns.

== Cultivation ==
Maclura pomifera prefers a deep and fertile soil, but is hardy over most of the contiguous United States, where it is used as a hedge. It must be regularly pruned to keep it in bounds, and the shoots of a single year will grow 1 to 2 m (3–6 ft) long, making it suitable for coppicing. A neglected hedge will become fruit-bearing. It is remarkably free from insect predators and fungal diseases. A thornless male cultivar of the species exists and is vegetatively reproduced for ornamental use. M. pomifera is cultivated in Italy, the former Yugoslavia, Romania, former USSR, and India.

== Chemistry ==
Osajin and pomiferin are isoflavones present in the wood and fruit in a roughly 1:2 ratio by weight, and in turn comprise 4–6% of the weight of dry fruit and wood samples. Primary components of fresh fruit include pectin (46%), resin (17%), fat (5%), and sugar (before hydrolysis, 5%). The moisture content of fresh fruits is about 80%.

== Uses ==
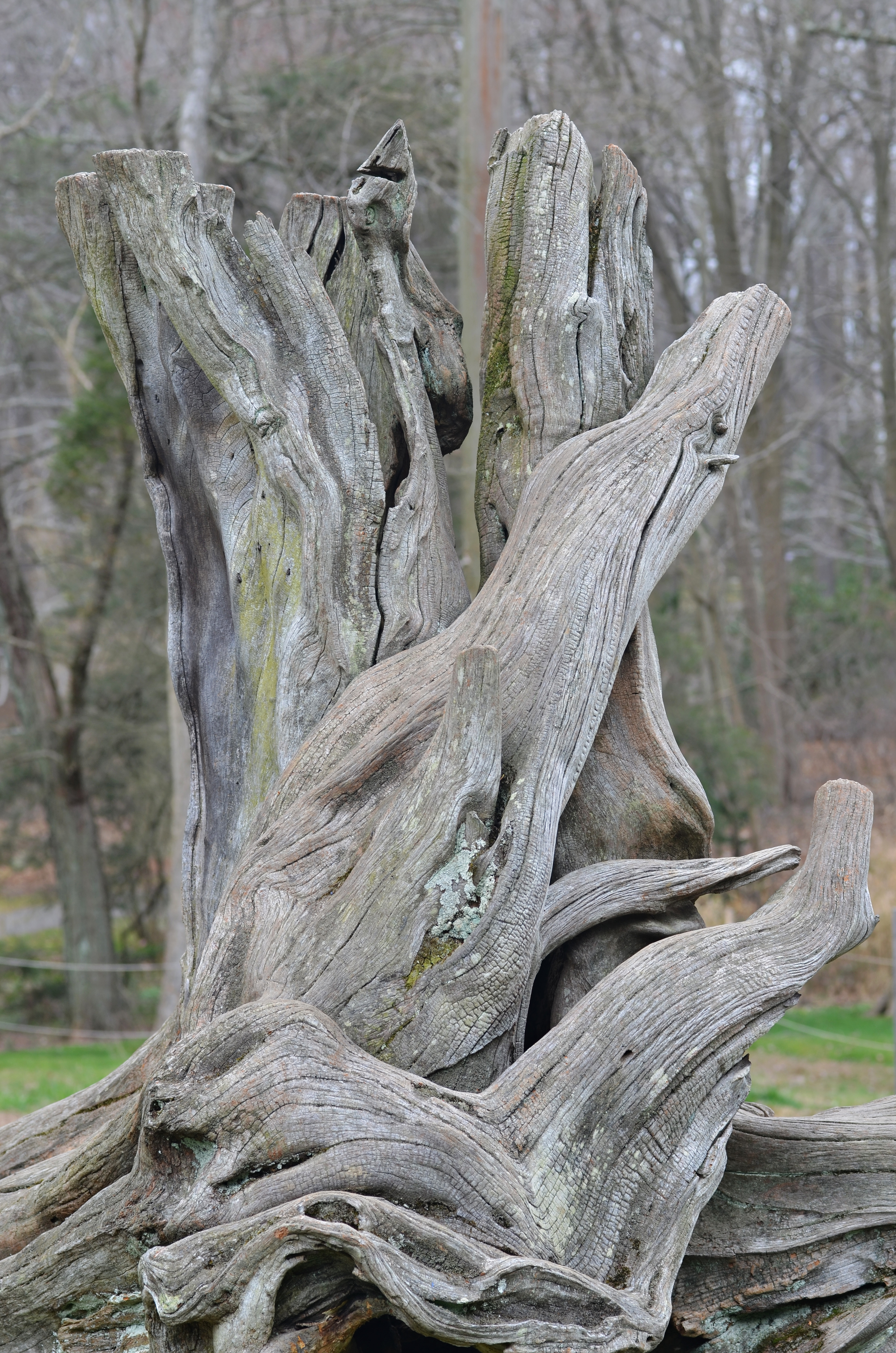
A tree felled in 1954 exhibits little rot after more than six decades.

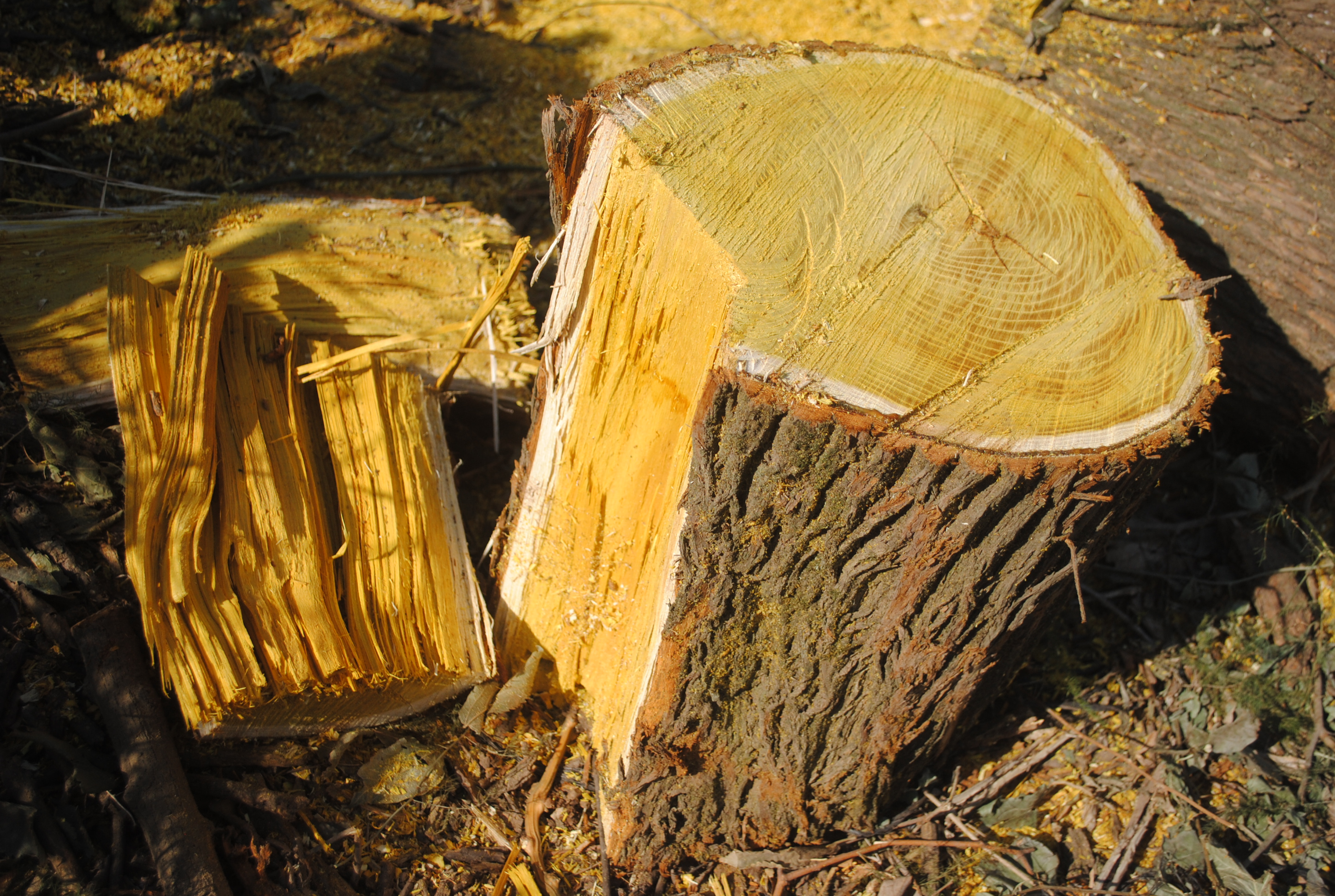
Typical bright-yellow newly cut wood

The Osage orange is commonly used as a tree row windbreak in prairie states, which gives it one of its colloquial names, "hedge apple". It was one of the primary trees used in President Franklin Delano Roosevelt's "Great Plains Shelterbelt" WPA project, which was launched in 1934 as an ambitious plan to modify weather and prevent soil erosion in the Great Plains states; by 1942, it resulted in the planting of 30,233 shelterbelts containing 220 million trees that stretched for 18,600 miles (29,900 km). The sharp-thorned trees were also planted as cattle-deterring hedges before the introduction of barbed wire, and afterward became an important source of fence posts. In 2001, its wood was used in the construction in Chestertown, Maryland, of the schooner Sultana, a replica of HMS Sultana.

The heavy, close-grained, yellow-orange wood is dense and prized for tool handles, treenails, fence posts, and other applications requiring a strong, dimensionally stable wood that withstands rot. Although its wood is commonly knotty and twisted, straight-grained Osage orange timber makes good bows, as used by Native Americans. John Bradbury, a Scottish botanist who had traveled the interior United States extensively in the early 19th century, reported that a bow made of Osage timber could be traded for a horse and a blanket. Additionally, a yellow-orange dye can be extracted from the wood, which can be used as a substitute for fustic and aniline dyes. At present, florists use the fruits of M. pomifera for decorative purposes.

When dried, the wood has the highest heating value of any commonly available North American wood.

Osage orange wood is more rot-resistant than most, making good fence posts. They are generally set up green because the dried wood is too hard to reliably accept the staples used to attach the fencing to the posts. Palmer and Fowler's Fieldbook of Natural History 2nd edition rates Osage orange wood as being at least twice as hard and strong as white oak (Quercus alba). The Wood Database gives a Janka hardness of 11.64 kN (white oak: 5.99 kN) and a modulus of rupture of 128.6 MPa (white oak: 102.3 MPa). Its dense grain structure makes for good tonal properties. Production of woodwind instruments and waterfowl game calls are common uses for the wood.

Compounds extracted from the fruit, when concentrated, may repel insects, but the naturally occurring concentrations of these compounds in the fruit are too low to make the fruit an effective insect repellent. In 2004, the EPA insisted that a website selling M. pomifera fruits online remove any mention of their supposed repellent properties as false advertising.

=== Traditional medicine ===
The Comanche formerly used a decoction of the roots topically as a wash to treat sore eyes.
