= Hurricane Juan =

Category 2 Atlantic hurricane in 2003

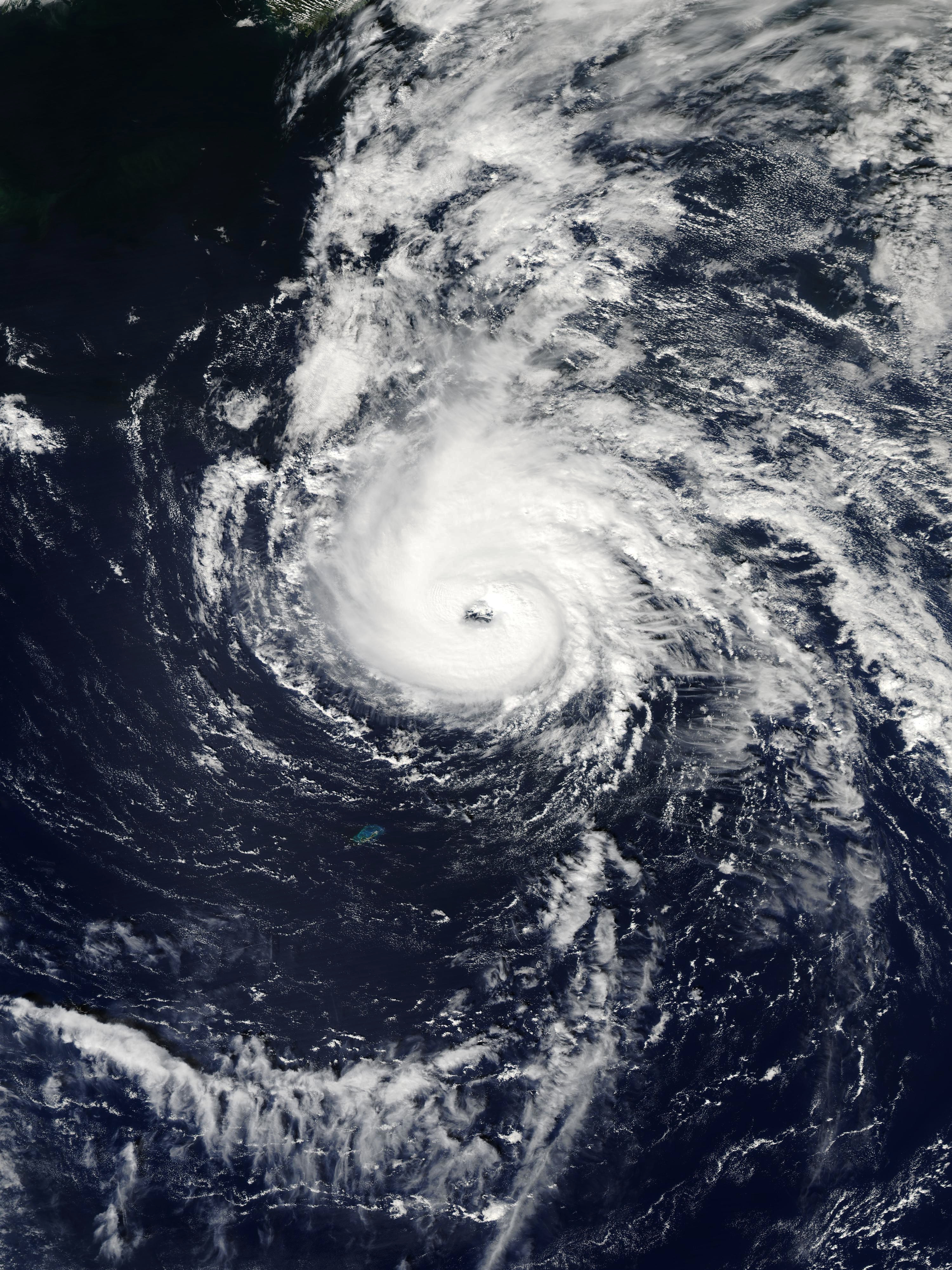
- Juan at peak intensity south of Nova Scotia on September 27

Meteorological history
- Formed: September 24, 2003
- Dissipated: September 29, 2003

Category 2 hurricane
- 1-minute sustained (SSHWS/NWS)
- Highest winds: 105 mph (165 km/h)
- Lowest pressure: 969 mbar (hPa); 28.61 inHg

Overall effects
- Fatalities: 8
- Damage: $200 million (2003 USD)
- Areas affected: Atlantic Canada (primarily Nova Scotia and Prince Edward Island)
- IBTrACS /
- Part of the 2003 Atlantic hurricane season

Hurricane Juan was a significant tropical cyclone which caused extensive damage to parts of Atlantic Canada, being the tenth named storm and the sixth hurricane of the 2003 Atlantic hurricane season. Juan formed southeast of Bermuda on September 24 from a tropical wave that had tracked across the subtropical Atlantic Ocean. It tracked northward and strengthened over the warm waters of the Gulf Stream, reaching Category 2 strength on the Saffir-Simpson hurricane scale on September 27. The hurricane peaked in intensity with sustained winds of 105 mph (169 km/h) that same day, losing some strength as it raced over cooler waters toward the coast of Nova Scotia, before making landfall between Shad Bay and Prospect in the Halifax Regional Municipality early on September 29 as a Category 2 hurricane with winds of 100 mph (160 km/h). Juan retained hurricane strength while travelling through Nova Scotia, though it weakened into a Category 1 hurricane over Prince Edward Island. Juan was eventually absorbed by another extratropical low on September 29 near Anticosti Island in the northern Gulf of Saint Lawrence.

Juan inflicted extensive damage across central Nova Scotia and into Prince Edward Island, with lesser damage east and west of the storm centre. Most of the damage occurred as a result of the intense winds that buffeted the region. Juan's passage resulted in eight fatalities and over CA $300 million (US$200 million) in damage. It was described as the worst storm to hit Halifax since the 1893 San Roque hurricane. On account of its destructiveness, the name Juan was officially retired from further use in the North Atlantic basin in 2004. A hurricane-strength nor'easter blizzard the following February was nicknamed White Juan for its similar location and power.

== Meteorological history ==
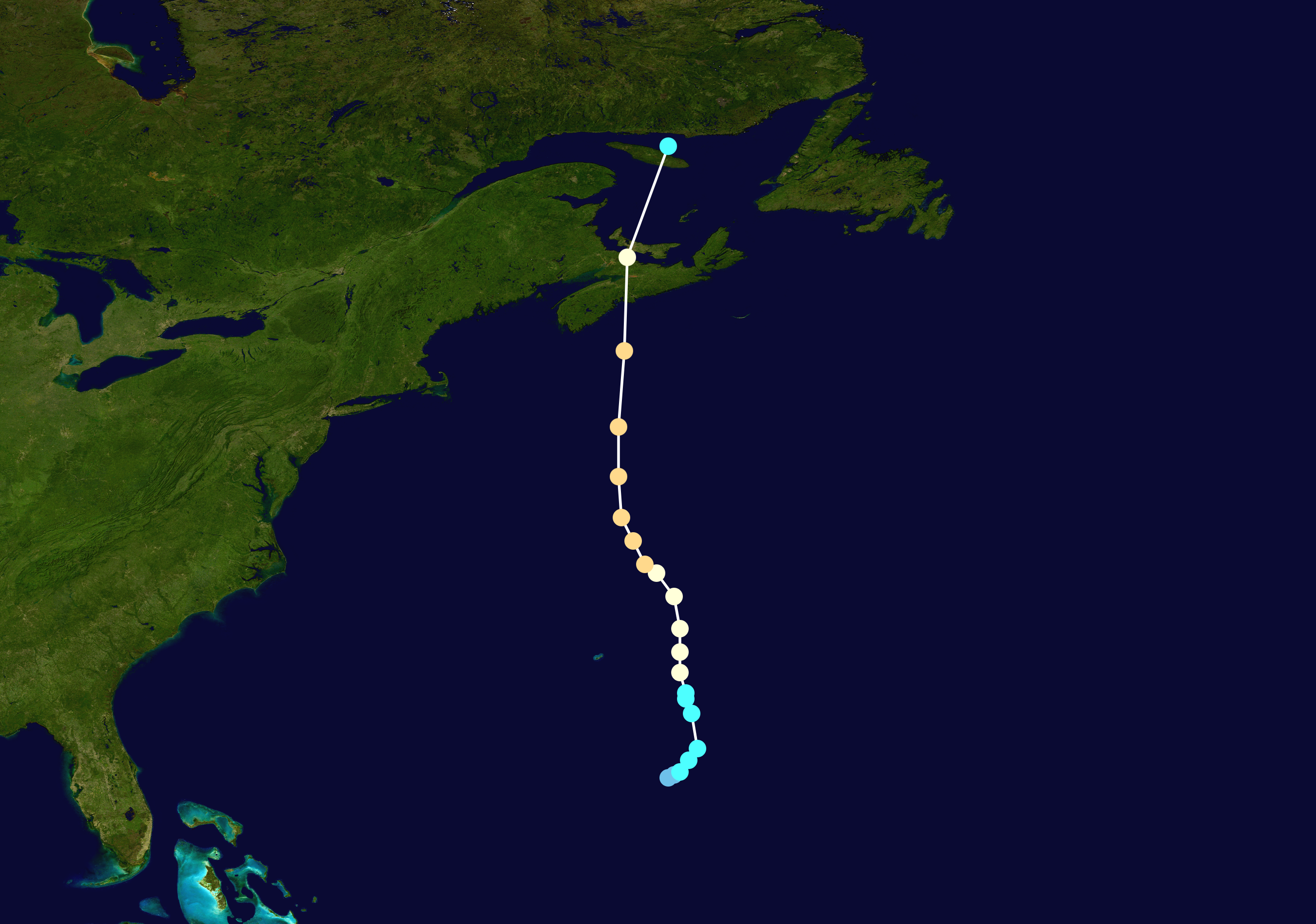
Map plotting the storm's track and intensity, according to the Saffir–Simpson scale Map key Saffir–Simpson scale Tropical depression (≤38 mph, ≤62 km/h) Tropical storm (39–73 mph, 63–118 km/h) Category 1 (74–95 mph, 119–153 km/h) Category 2 (96–110 mph, 154–177 km/h) Category 3 (111–129 mph, 178–208 km/h) Category 4 (130–156 mph, 209–251 km/h) Category 5 (≥157 mph, ≥252 km/h) Unknown Storm type Tropical cyclone Subtropical cyclone Extratropical cyclone, remnant low, tropical disturbance, or monsoon depression

A large tropical wave accompanied by a broad area of low pressure moved off the coast of Africa on September 14, 2003. It initially tracked westward and remained disorganized due to unfavourable upper-level wind shear. On September 20, the convection around the system greatly increased during interaction with the circulation of a large upper-level low, though unfavorable conditions caused the activity to remain disorganized. The system as a whole moved to the northwest around the upper-level low and developed a mid-level circulation. It interacted with a frontal zone, and became better organized on September 23 while located 450 mi (720 km) south of Bermuda. Later that day, a low-level circulation developed within the system, though its involvement with the proximate frontal zone prevented it from being classified a tropical depression. Deep convection increased near the centre on September 24, and the system quickly developed banding features and distinct outflow. Based on the increase in organization, the National Hurricane Center (NHC) classified it as Tropical Depression Fifteen later that day while it was located about 345 miles (555 km) southeast of Bermuda. Operationally, the agency did not initiate storm advisories until 27 hours after the time of its formation determined by post-hurricane season analysis.

Initially, the depression possessed a combination of tropical and subtropical characteristics; it remained attached to a nearby frontal zone, though the organization of the convection and a warm core within the system resulted in classification as a tropical cyclone. Forecasters had predicted the depression would only slowly strengthen and reach a peak intensity of 65 mph (105 km/h). However, the depression steadily organized and had strengthened into Tropical Storm Juan by early September 25. Juan moved northwestward at around 10 mph (16 km/h) in response to a developing subtropical ridge to its east. On September 26, an eye feature developed, and very deep convection increased around the circulation. The cloud pattern continued to consolidate, and Juan attained hurricane status later on September 26 while located 165 mi (266 km) southeast of Bermuda. The hurricane moved into an area of warm waters and light wind shear, allowing for additional strengthening; by September 27, Juan had attained a peak intensity of 105 mph (169 km/h) while located 635 mi (1,022 km) south of Halifax, Nova Scotia. At this peak strength, the eye of the hurricane was distinct and embedded within a well-defined and round central dense overcast.

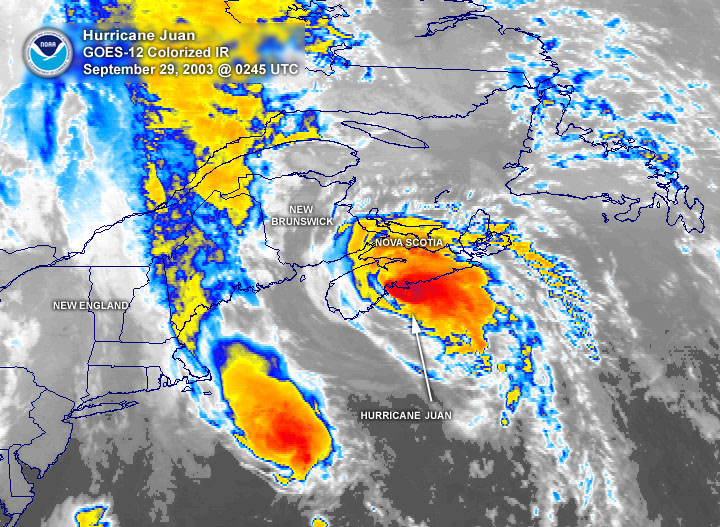
Hurricane Juan making landfall in Nova Scotia on September 29

Hurricane Juan remained at peak intensity for over 24 hours. After moving northwestward for an extended period of time, it turned and accelerated to the north. The eye became less distinct on September 28, and the hurricane weakened slightly. Due to its fast forward motion, Juan had little time to weaken over significantly colder waters before making landfall between Shad Bay and Prospect (near Halifax) on September 29 with winds of 100 mph (160 km/h). It weakened quickly while rapidly moving across the southern Canadian Maritimes and crossing the Nova Scotia peninsula as a hurricane. Juan had diminished to a tropical storm as it moved over Prince Edward Island by early September 29. The storm tracked northwards across the Northumberland Strait, making landfall near the community of Borden-Carleton and crossed Prince Edward Island in less than an hour. Later that afternoon, the storm was absorbed by a large extratropical low over the northwestern Gulf of Saint Lawrence.

== Preparations ==
During Juan's formative stages, the Bermuda Weather Service issued a tropical storm warning late on September 25, and kept the advisory for the island until the next day. Due to the potential for strong winds, The Causeway was closed, ferry service was cancelled, and some schools were closed. However, winds on the island remained below gale-force.

The first advisories were issued by the Canadian Hurricane Centre on September 26, although at that time they broadly suggested the possibility existed for wind and rain across Atlantic Canada. As Juan approached on September 27, warning broadcasts on local media in Atlantic Canada were changed accordingly. The public and emergency officials in the expected landfall area were told to make preparations for a potential disaster, after the CHC bulletins indicated the possibility existed for significant wind damage and flooding from both heavy rain and storm surges, as well as power outages.

On the morning of September 28, reports indicated that Juan would make landfall either as a tropical storm or marginal Category 1 hurricane. Weather broadcasts up to that time gave every indication that the storm would weaken prior to landfall. By 6 p.m. ADT (2100 UTC), additional warnings had been issued since Juan was expected to make landfall as a strong Category 1 or weak Category 2 hurricane. Most businesses in the areas affected were closed on Sundays, which meant that preparations could not be made at the last minute. Although no large-scale evacuations were made, local evacuations for low-lying areas were issued on the evening of September 28. In all, several hundred people were affected by these evacuations. Utility workers also stood on standby before the storm hit, preparing for large-scale power outages.

== Impact ==
=== Nova Scotia ===
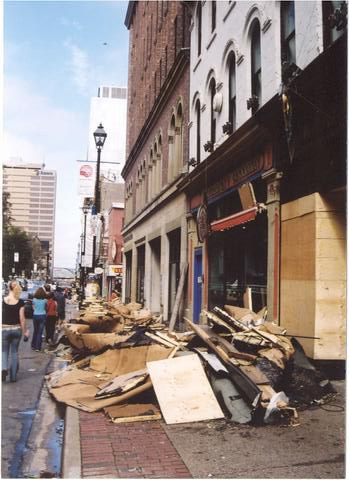
Debris on Barrington Street in Halifax following the hurricane

Hurricane Juan's maximum sustained wind speed at landfall in Nova Scotia was measured at 160 km/h (100 mph). The urban concentration surrounding Halifax Harbour bore the brunt of the highest sustained winds and strongest wind gusts during the storm; some unofficial estimates have placed gusts as high as 145 mph (233 km/h). Wave-rider weather buoys off the entrance of Halifax Harbour snapped their moorings after reportedly recording waves in excess of 65 ft (20 m). Significant erosion occurred on the populated shores of the harbour, particularly in the Bedford Basin where residential properties and railway tracks received most of the wave action. Storm surges of 5 to 7 feet (1.5 to 2.1 m) were reported in the harbour; it was the highest surge ever recorded in Halifax Harbour. Rainfall was fairly light due to the fast movement and dry air on the southern side of the storm. There were no rainfall reports greater than 51 millimetres (2 in).

Juan caused widespread structural and vegetation damage across the region, particularly in and around the Halifax Regional Municipality. Extensive damage to trees was reported, which blocked many streets and knocked down power lines. Many homes and businesses suffered property damage, particularly roof damage on structures, and some weaker structures were destroyed. HRM estimated that 31% of residential homes suffered some degree of damage and 27% of homes had enough damage to warrant an insurance claim. In Downtown Halifax, erosion-control boulders the size of garbage cans were hurled from Halifax Harbour onto boardwalks and parking lots and piers. The Victoria General Hospital experienced roof and water damage and was evacuated during the storm, as were numerous tall apartment buildings and other multi-family residences. Billboards and signs were also destroyed, and dozens of vehicles were crushed by trees and other debris. The city's cherished Point Pleasant Park and Public Gardens suffered massive loss of trees and remained closed for months.

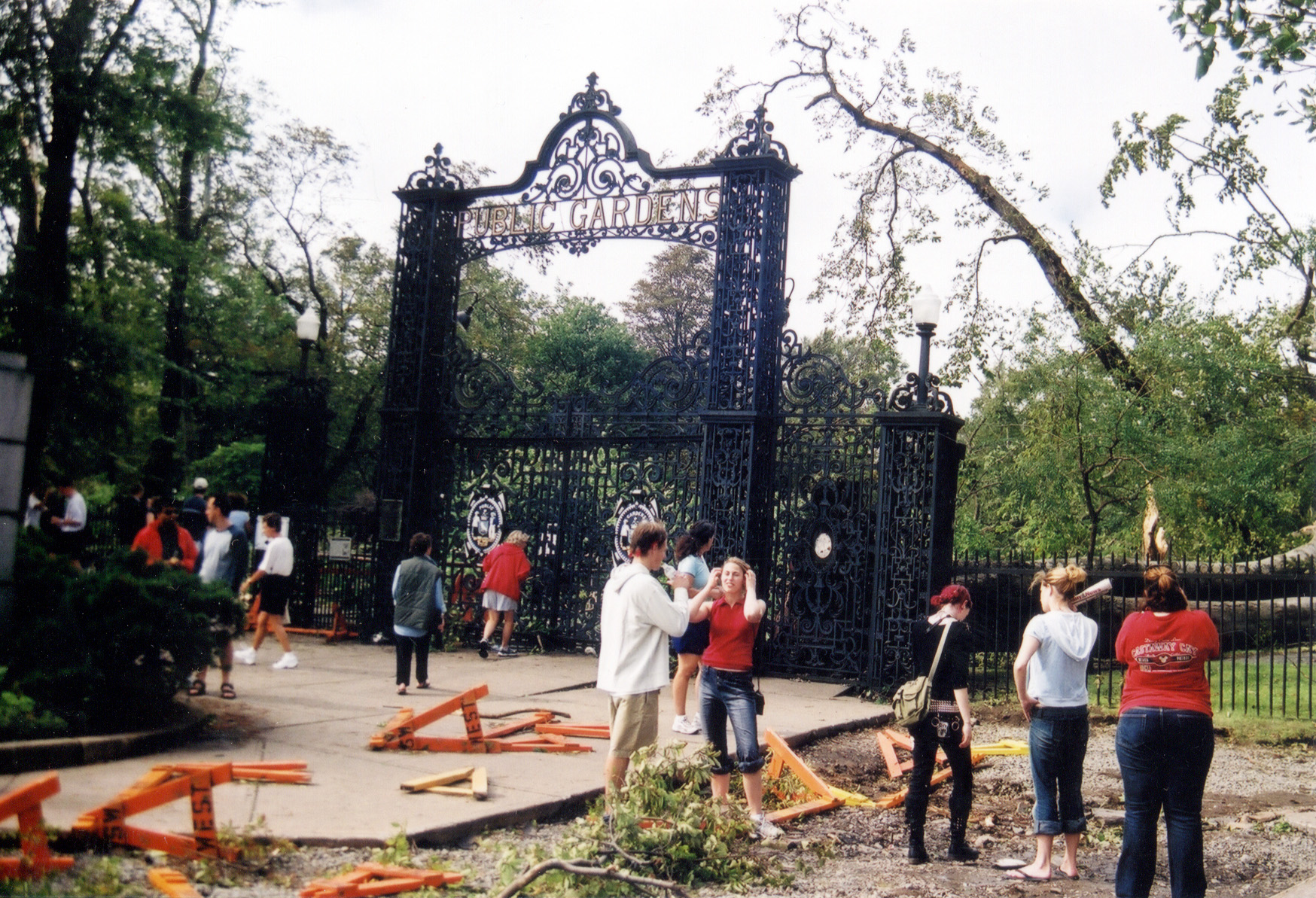
Damage to the Halifax Public Gardens after Hurricane Juan

Juan set an all-time maximum wind gust speed record at the Halifax Stanfield International Airport; during the peak of the storm, a gust reached 143 km/h, a record which still stands to this day. Another high windspeed occurred at the McNabs Island autostation, which recorded a 2-minute sustained wind of 151 km/h, with gusts to 176 km/h. Hurricane-force gusts extended as far east as Beaver Island, where gusts reached 132 km/h. The hurricane was strong enough to destroy the anemometers at Shannon Hill, Chebucto Head and Sambro Island, even though the Sambro Island instrument had survived a 193 km/h storm some years earlier.

The hurricane caused severe damage to shipping in Halifax Harbour. A visiting recreational schooner named Larinda was sunk at the wharf beside the Maritime Museum of the Atlantic and a harbour tour ketch Mar was driven ashore in Eastern Passage on the opposite side of Halifax Harbour. Another harbour tour vessel, the tern schooner Silva, broke from her moorings and caused extensive damage to the Cable Wharf on the Halifax Waterfront. Dozens of smaller yachts were also driven ashore; extensive damage occurred to yacht clubs in the Bedford Basin and Northwest Arm. Dozens of containers were knocked off two container ships at the South End Container Terminal. Wharves on the Halifax and Dartmouth waterfront suffered large amounts of damage and several railcars were washed into the harbour at the Dartmouth railway yard; one of the tracks for the double-track main line was washed out in several places along the Bedford Basin near Millview. Coastal flooding was also reported around Halifax Harbour as a result of the storm surge, although inland flooding was minor as rainfall was not heavy due to Juan's fast forward movement.

Less severe property damage was recorded west of the storm's track into St. Margarets Bay and Mahone Bay. In addition to Halifax Regional Municipality's urban core, the town of Truro and all of rural Colchester County as well as the western part of Pictou County experienced property damage and power outages from falling trees; numerous barns and other agricultural buildings were damaged east of the storm's path, including a replica of the Hector in Pictou Harbour. The severity of property damage in the metropolitan areas of Halifax and Dartmouth of Halifax Regional Municipality initially led some forecasters to believe that Juan was likely a Category 3 hurricane; however, the sustained wind reports did not justify that suggestion. Many of the deciduous trees in central Nova Scotia still had leaves, which magnified the effects of wind damage. Overall, the number of damaged trees was estimated to be in the millions.

Juan claimed six lives (two directly) in Nova Scotia. Both of the direct deaths were due to fallen trees; one was a Halifax paramedic and the other was a motorist in Enfield. Three of the four indirect deaths were as a result of a house fire started by candles when electricity was cut, and the fourth was in relief work after the storm.

=== Rest of Atlantic Canada ===
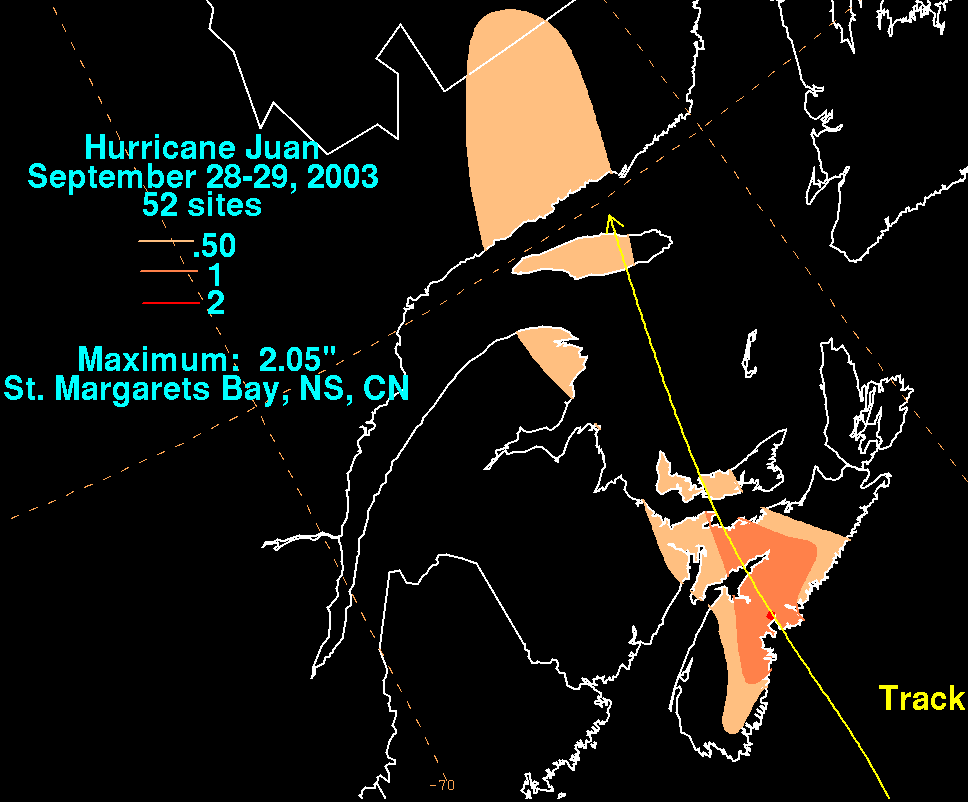
Rainfall from Hurricane Juan

The storm maintained Category 1 strength as it tracked across Nova Scotia and into the Northumberland Strait, weakening to a tropical storm as it emerged into the Gulf of Saint Lawrence. Wind gusts of 86 mph (138 km/h) were reported in Charlottetown and 67 mph (108 km/h) in the Magdalen Islands in the Gulf of Saint Lawrence.

Damage was also reported in Prince Edward Island as a result of the storm, particularly around Charlottetown, where its waterfront sustained heavy wave damage to pleasure craft and sea walls, as well as significant damage to the older urban forest in that city's downtown core. Extensive tree damage was also reported across the island, as well as structural damage to weaker buildings, such as barns and silos. The hurricane left portions of the island without power. The narrow path meant that damage was quite localized; little damage was reported in New Brunswick or western Prince Edward Island. Voting in the PEI general election on September 29 was also disrupted, though more than 80% of voters made it to polling stations.

Two deaths were reported in the Gulf of Saint Lawrence off the remote Anticosti Island in Quebec. They were fishermen from New Brunswick operating near Anticosti Island.

== Aftermath ==
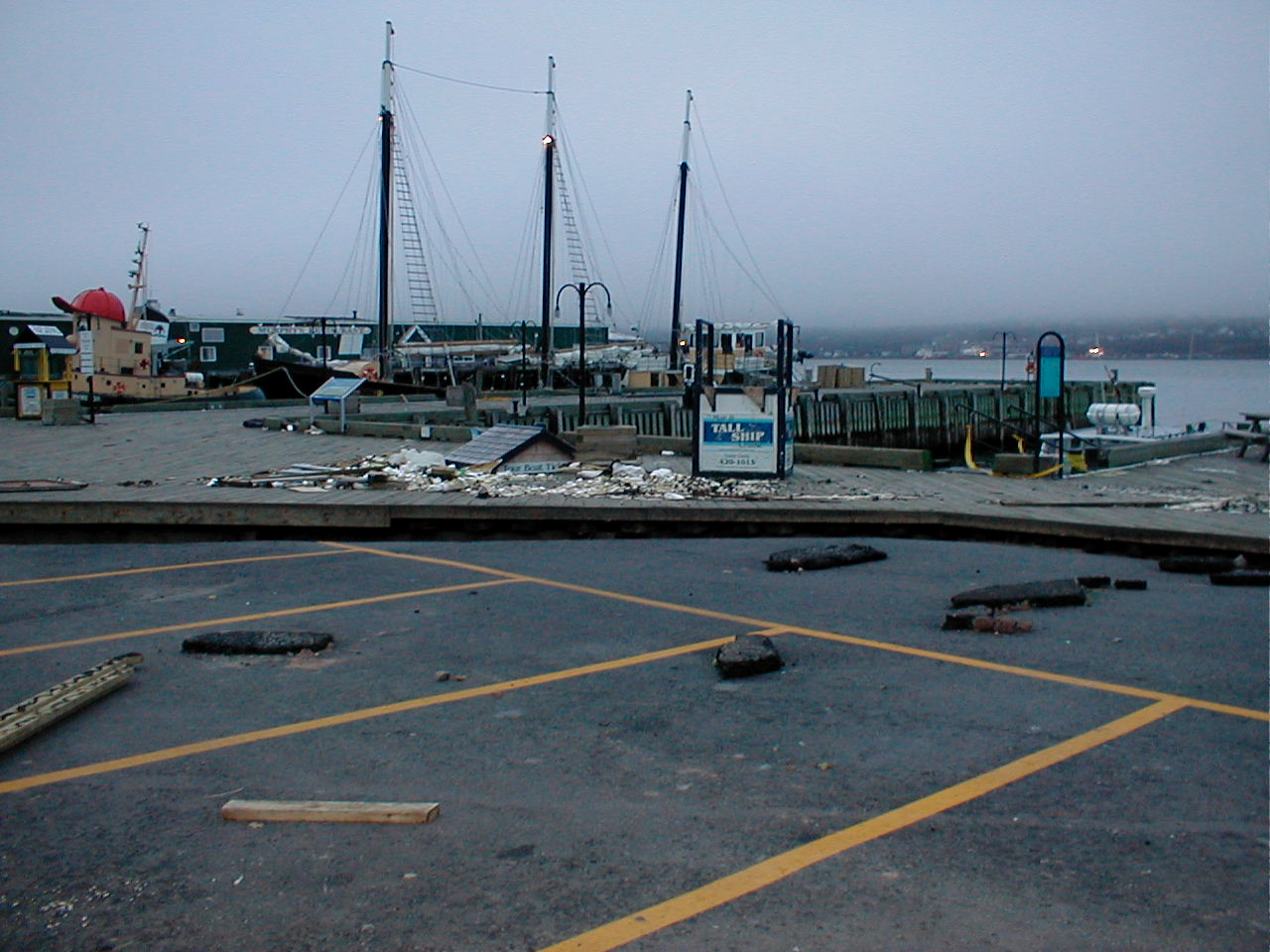
Halifax Waterfront after Hurricane Juan

In the hours following the storm a state of emergency was declared in Halifax Regional Municipality and parts of neighbouring East Hants Municipal District and Colchester County. The Government of Nova Scotia requested that the federal government deploy 600 Canadian Forces personnel to assist local authorities in HRM with clean-up in the urban area and to assist utility crews with electrical power restoration. Many utility workers, especially those employed by Nova Scotia Power and the dozens of crews from Maritime Electric and NB Power who responded under mutual assistance agreements, worked intensively for almost three weeks. Nova Scotia power reported that they had restored power to the last of their affected customers by October 12, 2 weeks after the storm had passed.

The devastated Point Pleasant Park remained closed for clean-up after the storm before re-opening in June 2004, nine months after the storm hit, with a damaged shoreline and almost 85% of its trees removed. A revitalization and reforestation program began in 2005.

The Government of Nova Scotia pledged $10 million (2003 CAD) in relief money after the hurricane hit, and private contributions were also made quickly after the storm hit. Prince Edward Island also pledged $200,000 (2003 CAD) immediately after the hurricane hit, and the federal government also announced their own package. The Mayor of Toronto at the time, Mel Lastman, also contributed $50,000 (2003 CAD) to replace damaged trees in Prince Edward Island.

Hurricane Juan alerted residents, governments, utilities, and emergency management agencies throughout Atlantic Canada to improve preparations for devastating events such as hurricanes, especially with climatological data pointing to possible increased frequency of major ocean storms and extratropical cyclones. In addition to Juan, three other storms — Fabian, Isabel and Kate — had a significant effect on land or offshore in Canada during the 2003 Atlantic hurricane season.

Preparations and planning have been underway since 2003 and were first tested when Hurricane Ophelia was forecast to brush near Nova Scotia in early September 2005. Hurricane Juan has also resulted in several changes to the Meteorological Service of Canada's Canadian Hurricane Centre, which has relocated from a vulnerable and exposed location in an office building in Dartmouth, Nova Scotia, to a more secure location that can withstand hurricane damage. CHC's hurricane warning system has also been improved; traditionally, CHC did not issue standard hurricane or tropical storm watches or warnings, just high wind and heavy rainfall warnings, which were often not heeded by local residents. Beginning in the 2004 Atlantic hurricane season, CHC began using standard hurricane warnings for storms potentially affecting Canada.

Hurricane Juan lent its name to a severe blizzard that struck Nova Scotia and Prince Edward Island a few months later in February 2004 which quickly became known as White Juan because the paralyzing effects of the massive snowfall evoked the recent hurricane.

=== Retirement ===
At the request of Environment Canada, the World Meteorological Organization retired the name Juan in the spring of 2004, and it will never again be used for a North Atlantic tropical cyclone. It was replaced with Joaquin for the 2009 season.

== See also ==
- Tropical cyclones in 2003
- Weather of 2003
- List of retired Atlantic hurricane names
- Timeline of the 2003 Atlantic hurricane season
- List of hurricanes in Canada
- Hurricane Noel (2007) – Similar approach to Juan
- Hurricane Igor (2010) – A Category 4 hurricane which struck Newfoundland
- Hurricane Fiona (2022) – A Category 4 hurricane that hit Canada
