= HMS Sultan =

Four ships and three shore establishments of the Royal Navy have been named HMS Sultan.

== Ships ==
- HMS Sultan (1775) was a 74-gun third rate launched in 1775, and converted for use as a prison ship in 1797. She was renamed HMS Suffolk in 1805 and was broken up in 1816.
- HMS Sultan (1807) was a 74-gun third rate launched in 1807, converted to a receiving ship in 1860, and broken up in 1864.
- HMS Sultan (1870) was a centre-battery ironclad launched in 1870. She was renamed HMS Fisgard IV in 1906, but reverted to Sultan while a training hulk in 1932. She was scrapped in 1946.

== Shore establishments ==
- HMS Sultan (1940 shore establishment) was the naval base at Singapore, commissioned in 1940 as a successor to HMS Terror. She was abandoned after the fall of Singapore in 1942.
  - HMS Sultan II was the accounting base at Singapore for sea-going tenders, commissioned in 1940 and paid off in 1941.
  - HMS Sultan III was the accounting base at Penang, commissioned in 1940 and paid off in 1941.
  - HMS Sultan IV was the accounting base at Singapore between 1941 and 1942.
- HMS Sultan (1945 shore establishment) was the accounting base at Singapore for personnel based at Keppel Harbour, commissioned in 1945 and paid off in 1947.
  - HMS Sultan II was the accounting base for the naval base at Singapore, commissioned in 1945 and paid off in 1946, becoming HMS Terror.
- HMS Sultan (1956 shore establishment) is the Marine Engineering training establishment at Gosport, and is also home to the Defence School of Electronic and Mechanical Engineering. It was commissioned in 1956.

== See also ==
- HMS Sultana (disambiguation)
- TCG Sultanhisar (1940), a destroyer launched for the Turkish Navy in 1940, and temporarily commissioned into the Royal Navy as HMS Sultan Hisar in 1941 for the passage to Turkey, being handed over in 1942.
