= Sultana Daku =

Sultana Daku may refer to:

- Sultana Daku, Indian dacoit and leader of the Sultana Daku 1920 Revolt
- Sultana Daku, a 1956 Indian Hindi-language film directed by Mohan Sinha
- Sultana Daku (1972 film), an Indian Hindi-language crime drama film directed by Mohammed Hussain
- Sultana Daku (1975 film), a Pakistani Punjabi-language biographical crime film directed by Muzaffar Tahir

== See also ==
- The Confession of Sultana Daku, a 2009 historical novel by Sujit Saraf
