= Sultanah, Saudi Arabia =

Sultanah
- street
- Location in Saudi Arabia
- Coordinates: 24°30′N 39°35′E
- Country: Saudi Arabia
- Province: Al Madinah Province
- Time zone: UTC+3 (EAT)
  - Summer (DST): UTC+3 (EAT)

Sultanah is a street with various restaurants and shops in Al Madinah Province, in western Saudi Arabia.

== See also ==
- List of cities and towns in Saudi Arabia
- Regions of Saudi Arabia
