= The Confession of Sultana Daku =

2009 novel by Sujit Saraf

- First edition cover
- Author: Sujit Saraf
- Language: English
- Genre: Historical fiction
- Publisher: Penguin Books India
- Publication date: November 2009
- Publication place: India
- Media type: Print (Hardback)
- Pages: 296
- ISBN: 978-0-670-08282-7
- Followed by: Peacock Throne

The Confession of Sultana Daku is a 2009 historical novel by Sujit Saraf. The novel is about the swashbuckling criminal career of Sultana Daku (Daku is the Hindi for bandit ), undisputedly the most notorious dacoit in modern India's history. He, actually, belonged to bhantu clan of criminals who terrorized the United Provinces (as Uttar Pradesh was then known) in 1920. The novel begins after he is captured by the ruling British and thrown into the Haldwani Gaol. Here, just, a few hours to the gallows, he has a change of heart and he requests for Lieutenant Colonel Samuel Pearce, the officer who played a major role in capturing him.

The officer, interested in Indian culture, always keeps paper and a pencil ready, so Sultana easily persuades him to record his biography because he wants his clansmen, especially his son, to know his thoughts and feelings during the upheavals of his life of crime. The account describes his feelings, including his love for his horse Chetak (the choice of name indicates his love for chivalry, that being the historical mount of Maharana Pratap), while his dog's name, Rai Bahadur, perhaps suggests his contempt for titular kings

== See also ==
- Sultana Daku 1920 Revolt
