= Sultana Point, South Australia =

Sultana Point South Australia
- Coordinates: 35°07′00″S 137°44′29″E
- Population: 27 (SAL 2021)
- Established: 2013
- Postcode(s): 5583
- Time zone: ACST (UTC+9:30)
  - Summer (DST): ACST (UTC+10:30)
- Location: 80 km (50 mi) west of Adelaide
- LGA(s): Yorke Peninsula Council
- Region: Yorke and Mid North
- County: Fergusson
- State electorate(s): Narungga
- Federal division(s): Grey
Mean max temp	Mean min temp	Annual rainfall
20.4 °C; 69 °F	12.1 °C; 54 °F	372.5 mm 14.7 in
Suburbs around Sultana Point:
Edithburgh	Edithburgh	Gulf St Vincent
Edithburgh	Sultana Point	Gulf St Vincent
Gulf St Vincent	Gulf St Vincent	Gulf St Vincent
- Footnotes: Distances; Coordinates; Climate; Adjoining localities

Sultana Point is a locality in the Australian state of South Australia located on the Yorke Peninsula immediately adjoining the western head of Gulf St Vincent about 80 kilometres (50 miles) west of the state capital of Adelaide.

Its boundaries were created in November 2011 in response to a request from the then District Council of the Yorke Peninsula to “formally recognise this long established community.” The locality is bounded to the north by Hilsea Road and by Wattle Bay Road to the west.

Sultana Point is located within the federal division of Grey, the state electoral district of Narungga and the local government area of the Yorke Peninsula Council.

== See also ==
- List of cities and towns in South Australia
- Sultana (disambiguation)
