= Sultana (1787 ship) =

English Merchant ship

History

Great Britain
- Name: Sultana
- Launched: 1787, or 1788, Yarmouth
- Captured: 1799
- Fate: 6 × 2-pounder guns

General characteristics
- Tons burthen: 172, or 175, or 180(bm)

Sultana was launched in 1787 or 1788, at Yarmouth. She traded with the Mediterranean and the West Indies. A French privateer captured her in April 1799. She quickly returned to British ownership, but was recaptured again in 1801.

== Career ==
Unavailable issues resulted in Sultana first appearing in online issues of Lloyd's Register (LR), in 1789. She appeared, with Thompson, master, in an advertisement stating her readiness to sail to Leghorn. The advertisement described her as newly built.

| Year | Master | Owner | Trade | Source |
|---|---|---|---|---|
| 1789 | Thompson | B.Dowson | London–Leghorn | LR |
| 1798 | Thompson | London | London–Martinique | LR |
| 1799 | Dunstan | Captain & Co. | London–Lisbon | LR |

1st capture: In April 1799 Lloyd's Register reported that a privateer had captured Sultana, Danson, master, and taken her into Vigo. The privateer Legere, of Bayonne, captured the English three-masted ship Sultana, Danson, master. Sultana was carrying "warlike stores and provisions". Legere sent Sultana into Vigo. (Note: HMS Flora captured Legere, a schooner privateer, belonging to Bayonne, on 19 April 1799, at 38°26′N 9°00′W. Legere, of 14 guns, 44 men, and 80 tons burthen, was on her way to Vigo. French sources give the date of capture as 28 April 1799.)

French sources report that Legérè had been fitted out by the Bayonnais merchant Castro. She was of 83 tons (French; "of load"), was armed with eight 8-pounder, four 4-pounder, and two 3-pounder guns. She had a crew of 53 men under the command of Captain Mallenx. Before the British captured her, she had captured a British three-masted vessel named Sultane, Damon, master, and sent her into Vigo. (Note: Legérè had also captured the American brig Éléonore, of 150 tons (bm), carrying 280 bales of tobacco and 28 crates of sugar, the Prussian galliot Joana, and the American vessel Perle.)

Sultana quickly returned to British ownership by some process.

| Year | Master | Owner | Trade | Source |
|---|---|---|---|---|
| 1800 | J.Dawson | Captain & Co. | London–Lisbon | Register of Shipping (RS) |
| 1801 | T.Cole | Captain & Co. | London–Lisbon | Register of Shipping (RS) |

2nd capture: Lloyd's List reported in May 1801 that Sultana, Cole, master, and another vessel, had been captured on their way from Halifax to London and taken into Passages.
