= La Sultana =

1962 Soviet ship-turned-yacht

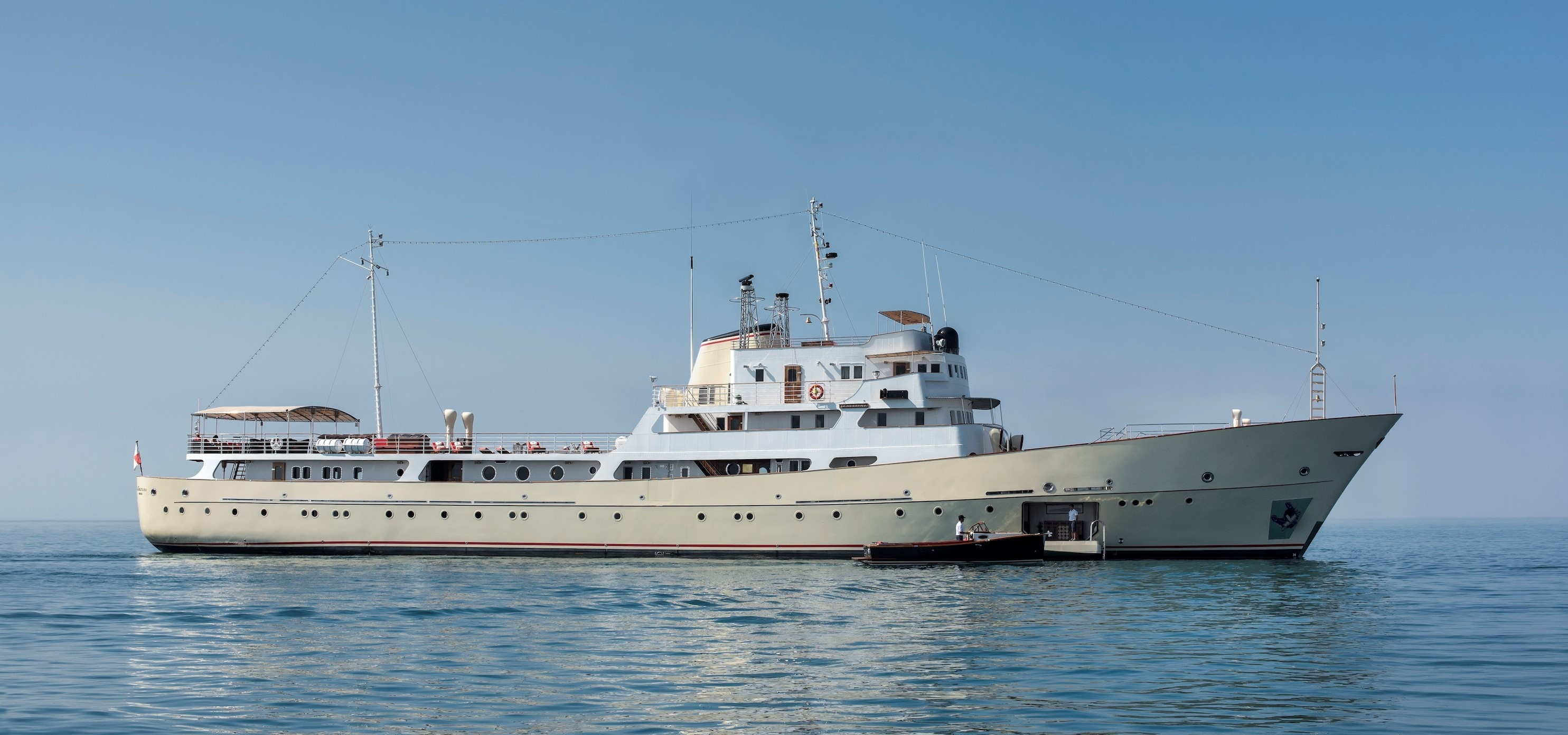

History
- Name: La Sultana
- Builder: Georgi Dimitrov
- Launched: 1962
- Refit: 2015
- Identification: IMO number: 6725274; MMSI number: 357537000; Callsign: HO4808
- Status: Active

General characteristics
- Type: Steel hull
- Tonnage: 878
- Length: 63.8 m (209 ft)
- Beam: 9.33 m (30.6 ft)
- Draught: 3.85 m (12.6 ft)
- Installed power: 1 x 1,000 hp Mitsubishi
- Speed: 12 kn (22 km/h; 14 mph)
- Range: 8,800 km (5,500 mi)
- Crew: 17

La Sultana is a yacht that has been refitted from a Soviet era ferry. She was launched in 1962, under the name Aji-Petri and was the fifth in a series of 12 ships that were originally built for the Russian fleet. Her purpose was to transport freight and passengers between the ports of Odessa, Yalta, Sebastopol and Istanbul between the Azov and Black seas. During the Cold War, the ship was believed to be used as a Soviet spy vessel. During the refitting process several spying instruments were discovered, including a radioactivity detector and thick aluminum insulation across the entire boat.

== History ==
Built in 1962 for shipping and transportation services the boat was originally named Aji-Petri. She could carry 102 passengers in cabins, with 110 more passengers on the deck and 46 crew members on board. In 1970, during Cold War tensions, the family of ships gradually stopped ferrying passengers in the Black Sea in order to be re-fitted for strategic purposes by the USSR. The ship was eventually sent to the North Atlantic and used for unofficial spying on the United States and United Kingdom by the International Organisation of Telecommunications. At the conclusion of the Cold War she was returned to a Bulgarian shipping company and resumed her transportation and shipping role. In 2007, she was acquired by the La Sultana Group to be re-fitted as a luxury yacht.

After undergoing a seven-year refitting, including being stripped from top to bottom, the bow has been raised to create a shielded ipe wood deck. The yacht houses seven cabins on six floors. Part of the re-fitting included upgrading to a diesel Mitsubishi engine that is used to drive the original propeller. Although it no longer serves as the engine telegraph, the Bulgarian language engine order telegraph is still prominently displayed while the original push button steering controls are still used. La Sultana carries three tender boats, two Lancel boats and an XPro 490. In 2016, La Sultana was included in Refit, a book published by Boat International Media, that highlights yacht refits, rebuilds and restorations.
