= HMS Sultana (1780) =

Cutter of the Royal Navy

History

Great Britain
- Name: HMS Sultana
- Acquired: June 1780 by purchase
- Fate: Sold 1799

General characteristics
- Type: Cutter
- Tons burthen: 15240/94 (bm)
- Length: Overall: 65 ft 7 in (19.99 m); Keel: 48 ft 9 in (14.9 m)
- Beam: 24 ft 3 in (7.39 m)
- Depth of hold: 9 ft 7 in (2.92 m)
- Complement: 60
- Armament: Initially: 12 × 4-pounder guns + 8 × ½-pounder swivel guns; Later: 10 × 12-pounder carronades + 12 × ½-pounder swivel guns

HMS Sultana was the mercantile Sprightly, which the Royal Navy purchased in June 1780. She served in the Channel and around Ireland before the Admiralty sold her in 1799.

== Career ==
The Admiralty bought Sprightly in June 1780, and then spent the next three plus months having her fitted and coppered at Sheerness. In July she was commissioned for the Channel under the command of Lieutenant Lewis Fabian.

In December 1780 Sultana seized and sent into Dover the Dutch vessel Herstelder, Kemp Janssen Klein, master, as she was sailing from Amsterdam to Mogador and Sallee. The Admiralty Court ordered her restored to her owners in February 1782. In 1787 Parliament awarded them £2307 9s 4d for the detention and for cargo "belonging to the emperor."

The next year Sultana was on the Downs station, and then was paid off. While she was under Fabian's command, she captured the Dutch ships Flora and Kingsburg, and the French boats Cigale, Providence, and Heureux St Pierre. The capture of the Dutch ships probably occurred around 1 January 1781.

In 1783 the Navy had Sultana refitted at Plymouth for service in the Channel. She was recommissioned in May for the Irish Sea under Lieutenant J. Pierie. She was paid off in April 1786.

She was recommissioned in June 1786 under Lieutenant Edward Roe for the Channel. In 1789 she came under the command of Lieutenant Digby Dent. He remained in command until 1792.

== Fate ==
Sultana was paid off into Ordinary in April 1793. She was offered for sale on 9 April 1799, and was sold on 13 April 1799 for £296 to Mr. Richard Dunsterville.
