= HMS Sultana (1768) =

Royal Navy schooner (1768–1773)

Coordinates: 42°59′47″N 69°32′26″W

History

Great Britain
- Name: HMS Sultana
- Owner: Royal Navy
- Builder: Benjamin Hallowell
- Launched: 1767
- Acquired: 1768
- In service: 27 August 1768
- Out of service: 10 October 1772
- Fate: Sold at auction

General characteristics
- Class & type: Schooner
- Tons burthen: 5268/94 (bm)
- Length: 50 ft 6 in (15.4 m) (deck); 38 ft 5 1/8 in (11.7 m) (keel)
- Beam: 16 ft 0 3/3 in (4.9 m)
- Depth of hold: 8 ft 4 in (2.5 m)
- Complement: 25
- Armament: 8 x ½-pounder swivel guns

HMS Sultana was a small Royal Navy schooner that patrolled the American coast from 1768 through 1772. Her role was to prevent smuggling and to collect customs duties. She was retired and sold in 1773 when unrest in Britain's American colonies required larger, better armed patrol craft.

== Career ==
Sultana was built in the yard of renowned Boston Shipwright Benjamin Hallowell in 1767, probably as a yacht. She made one voyage from Boston to England.

The Royal Navy purchased her for £292 9s 0d from Sir Thomas Hesketh on 18 March 1768. She underwent fitting by John Randall, of Rotherhithe between 19 March and 25 August. At the time of purchase, her lines were taken off and a draught of the hull filed at the Admiralty. She was one of six Marblehead schooners that the Royal Navy bought.

The navy named her HMS Sultana and commissioned her in July under the command of Lt John Inglis, who would end his service to the crown as Vice Admiral of the Blue. Sultana's logbook began on 15 July 1768.

Sultana left Dungeness on the morning of 27 August 1768. Her assignment was to enforce the Townshend Acts (and to enforce tea taxes) by stopping smugglers. The schooner's master was David Bruce.

Sultana's first assignment once she reached Halifax was to proceed to Boston to help land General Gage's troops in Boston for the protection of customs officials. Following that, she sailed up and down the coast of the Colonies, visiting Rhode Island, New York, Pennsylvania, North Carolina, New Jersey, Delaware, Virginia and many spots in the lower Chesapeake tidewater region. On 10 October 1772 Sultana set off to England.

== Fate ==
Sultana was paid off in December. She was sold at auction in Portsmouth on 11 August 1773 to John Hook Jr. for £85.

== Modern replicas ==
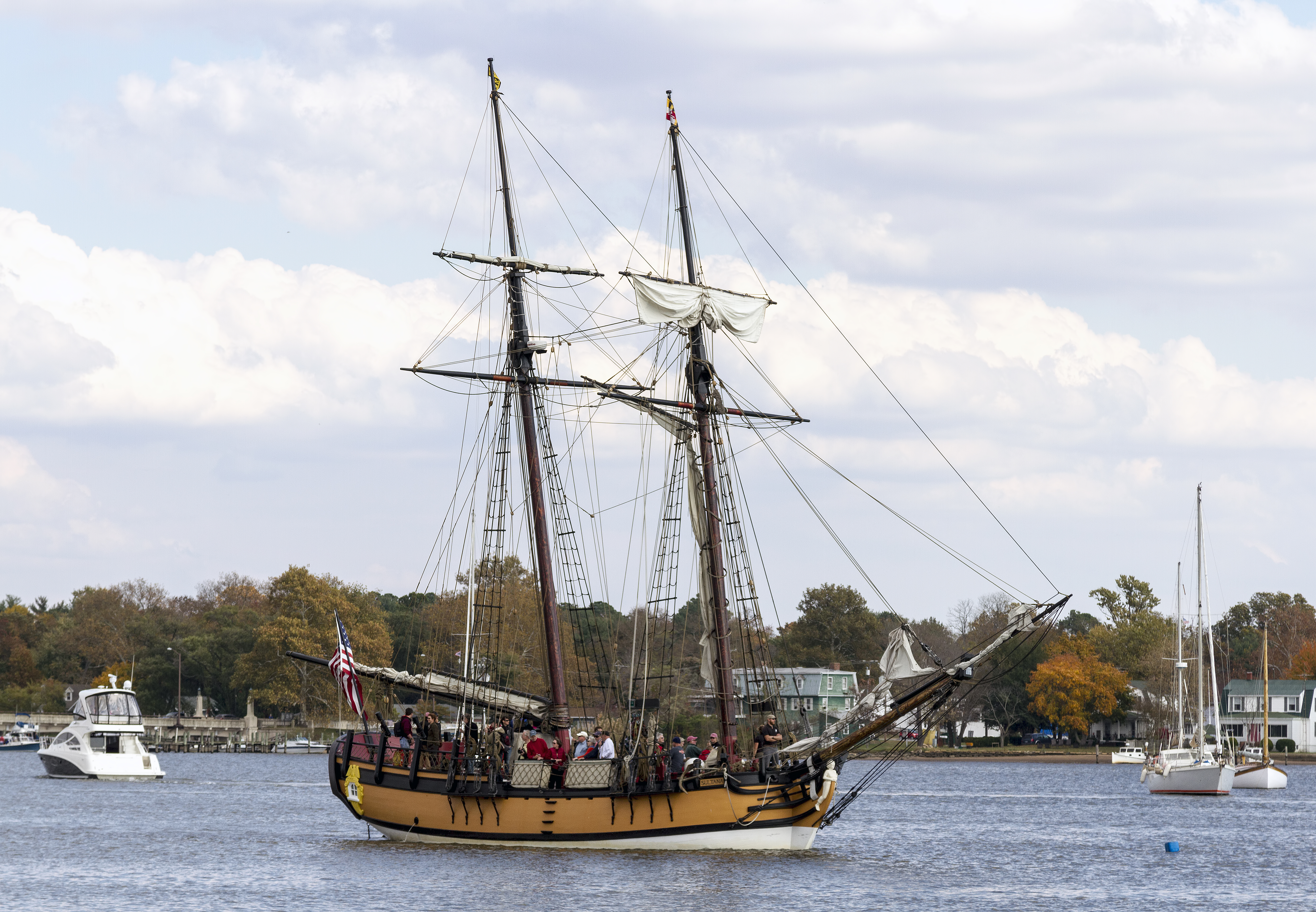
The replica Sultana on the Chester River in 2013

A new Sultana, launched in Chestertown, Maryland, in 2001, serves as an educational vessel for schoolchildren as it travels around the Chesapeake Bay. Each year there are public excursions out of Chestertown and other ports. "Downrigging Weekend" in Chestertown is always the first weekend in November. Replica sailing ships from all around the mid-Atlantic participate in sailing excursions and allow the public on board.

The replica vessel is not an exact reconstruction. It has a diesel auxiliary engine and otherwise conforms to Coast Guard regulations in order to carry passengers. The modern version is framed with osage orange and planked with oak; there is a lead ballast keel which the original did not have. She has only four guns, rather than the original eight. All work and can be fired. Within modern safety requirements, however, she was built following traditional methods as much as possible.

The Howard I. Chapelle drawings of Sultana, traced from the Admiralty draughts, also inspired another modern vessel, the schooner Larinda. Her design is loosely based on Sultana but with a junk-rig and fantasy woodwork featuring whimsical details such as a frog for a figurehead.

== See also ==
- Ship replica (including a list of ship replicas)
- Gaspée Affair. The schooner HMS Gaspée was purchased into the Royal Navy for the same purpose as Sultana. In 1772, Rhode Islanders burned the vessel. A Gaspée Days celebration is held every year.
