= HMCS Sackville =

Flower-class corvette

Coordinates: 44°38′50.85″N 63°34′09.35″W

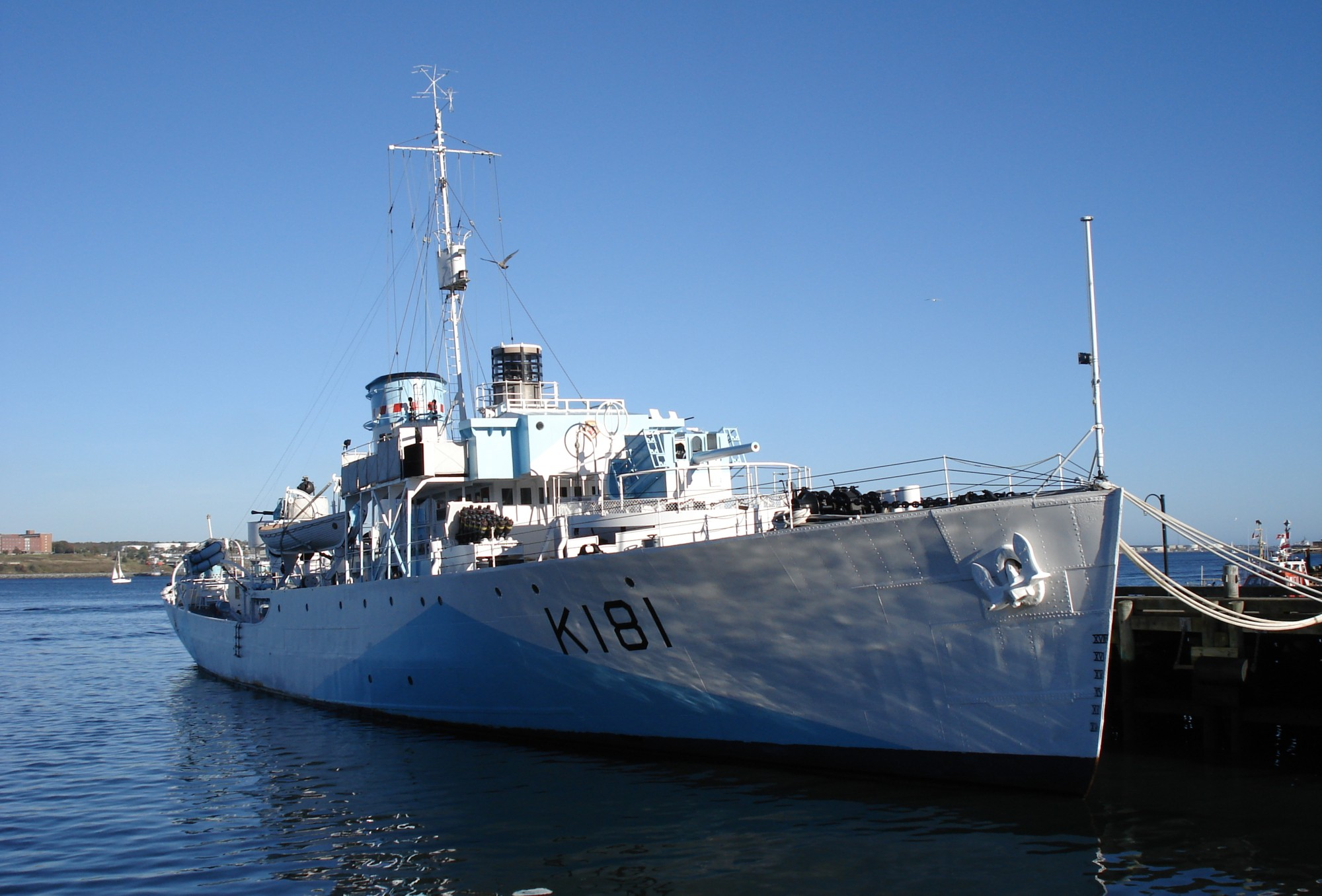
- HMCS Sackville in October 2006, moored behind the Maritime Museum of the Atlantic in Halifax, Nova Scotia, and restored to her 1944 condition.

History

Canada
- Name: Sackville
- Namesake: Sackville, New Brunswick
- Builder: Saint John Dry Dock and Shipbuilding Company Ltd.
- Laid down: 28 May 1940
- Launched: 15 May 1941
- Commissioned: 30 December 1941
- Decommissioned: 8 April 1946
- Recommissioned: 15 May 2026
- Refit: Thompson Bros. Machinery Co. Ltd., Liverpool, Nova Scotia, commenced 14 January 1943, machinery replacement, minesweeping gear removed, bridge wings extended to fit Oerlikon 20 mm AA; Galveston, Texas, 28 February 1944 – 7 May 1944, forecastle extended, new bridge, hedgehog fitted, mast moved abaft of bridge, new boats, new electronics
- Identification: Pennant number: K181
- Honors and awards: Atlantic 1942-44
- Status: In ceremonial commission as a museum ship in Halifax

General characteristics
- Class & type: Flower-class corvette
- Displacement: 950 tons
- Length: 62.5 m (205 ft 1 in)
- Beam: 10 m (32 ft 10 in)
- Draught: 3.5 m (11 ft 6 in)
- Propulsion: Single shaft, 2 fire tube Scotch boilers, 1 4-cyl. triple expansion steam engine, 2,750 hp (2,050 kW)
- Speed: 16 knots (30 km/h; 18 mph)
- Complement: 85
- Armament: 1 BL 4 in (102 mm) Mk.IX gun; 1 QF Mk.VIII 2-pounder gun on antiaircraft mount; 2 20 mm Oerlikon AA cannon; 2 Lewis .303 cal twin machine guns; 4 Mk.II depth charge throwers; 2 depth charge rails with 40 depth charges; 1 Mk 3 hedgehog

National Historic Site of Canada
- Official name: HMCS Sackville National Historic Site of Canada
- Designated: 1988

HMCS Sackville is a Flower-class corvette that served in the Royal Canadian Navy and later served as a civilian research vessel. She is now a museum ship located in Halifax, Nova Scotia, and the last surviving Flower-class corvette. On 15 May 2026, Sackville was recommissioned into the Royal Canadian Navy on a symbolic and ceremonial basis.

== Wartime service ==
Sackville's keel was laid down as Patrol Vessel 2 at the Saint John Shipbuilding and Drydock Company of Saint John, New Brunswick in early 1940, the second of the Flower-class corvettes ordered by the Royal Canadian Navy. She was launched on 15 May 1941 by Mrs. J. E. W. Oland, wife of the captain of the port, with the Mayor and entire town council of her namesake town in attendance. Sackville was commissioned into the Royal Canadian Navy on 30 December 1941 by Captain J. E. W. Oland, husband of the ship's sponsor. Her first commanding officer, Lieutenant W. R. Kirkland, RCNR was appointed on 30 December but did not join Sackville until 2 January. Kirkland was discharged in March 1942 as "unsuitable" after a poor working-up trip to Newfoundland in late February. The first lieutenant reported that Kirkland had been unable to discharge his duties and had been abusive to his officers. After rescuing the survivors from the sunken Greek ship Lily, Sackville was unable to re-locate her convoy, ON 68. The first lieutenant then took the step of relieving Kirkland and assuming command. The original crew was reposted to other RCN ships and the already trained crew of HMCS Baddeck under Lieutenant-Commander Alan H. Easton, RCNR was drafted onto the ship on 6 April 1942. Also in April Sackville received Canadian-built SW1C radar and worked up at Halifax and St. Margarets Bay.

The ship was finally assigned to Escort Group C-3 of the Mid-Ocean Escort Force along with two others (Galt and Wetaskiwin) on 15 May 1942 to replace corvettes going for refit. In August 1942 Sackville fought a series of fierce actions escorting Convoy ON 115. Deprived of air cover by heavy fog, the convoy was attacked by two successive U-boat "wolfpacks" off the coast of Newfoundland. On 3 August, Sackville caught the German submarine U-43 on the surface and, as the submarine dived, made a series of depth charge attacks which badly damaged the submarine. U-43 survived but had to retreat to France for repairs with serious damage to its engines, compressors, a leaking hatch and a crewman with internal injuries. The next day Sackville attacked U-704 as it dived, causing the submarine to break off its attack leaving Sackville to rescue two survivors from an abandoned but still floating merchant ship. Only a few hours later, Sackville detected U-552 on the surface with radar and landed a four-inch shell on the submarine's conning tower followed by a depth charge. U-552 nearly sank but managed to regain control and creep back to Germany heavily damaged. Sackville's attacks had played a key role in allowing the 41 ship convoy to escape with the loss of only two ships.

Sackville continued in her escort role until starting an extensive refit at Thompson Bros. Machinery Co. Ltd. in Liverpool, Nova Scotia in January 1943. She returned to service in April and was assigned to Escort Group C-1 where she remained until reassigned to a new group Escort Group 9 in July. The group was disbanded following the loss of three of its ships on 20–22 September and the ship assigned to group C-2, where the ship remained on Atlantic escort work until going for refit in Galveston, Texas in February 1944.

Returning to Halifax in May 1944 the vessel worked up in Bermuda and was then assigned to Escort Group C-2 which left for Derry escorting convoy HX 297 on 29 June 1944.

At Derry the boilers were cleaned, which revealed a serious leak in one of them. Repairs were unsuccessful and the ship was no longer considered suitable for convoy escort work. Since the ship had only recently been modernized she was reassigned for training at HMCS King on 29 August 1944.

However, almost immediately afterwards the decision was made to convert her to a loop layer, laying anti-submarine indicator loops across harbour entrances, her damaged boiler removed to provide storage for the cable and the 4-inch gun replaced with a pair of cranes. She remained in this role until paid off in April 1946 and laid up in reserve.

=== Trans-Atlantic convoys escorted ===
Convoy	Escort group	Dates	Notes
HX 175		13-15 Feb 1942	27 ships escorted without loss from Newfoundland to Iceland
SC 72		28 Feb-5 March 1942	19 ships escorted without loss from Newfoundland to Iceland
ON 70		11–15 March 1942	30 ships escorted without loss from Iceland to Newfoundland
HX 191	MOEF group C3	28 May-5 June 1942	24 ships escorted without loss from Newfoundland to Northern Ireland
ON 104	MOEF group C3	17–27 June 1942	36 ships escorted without loss from Northern Ireland to Newfoundland
SC 90	MOEF group C3	6–15 July 1942	32 ships escorted without loss from Newfoundland to Northern Ireland
ON 115	MOEF group C3	25 July-4 Aug 1942	Northern Ireland to Newfoundland; 3 ships torpedoed (2 sank)
HX 202	MOEF group C3	12-17 Aug 1942	43 ships escorted without loss from Newfoundland to Iceland
ON 121	MOEF group C3	17-20 Aug 1942	34 ships escorted without loss from Iceland to Newfoundland
SC 98	MOEF group C3	2-11 Sep 1942	69 ships escorted without loss from Newfoundland to Northern Ireland
ON 131	MOEF group C3	19-28 Sep 1942	54 ships escorted without loss from Northern Ireland to Newfoundland
HX 210	MOEF group C3	7-14 Oct 1942	36 ships escorted without loss from Newfoundland to Northern Ireland
ON 141	MOEF group C3	26 Oct-3 Nov 1942	59 ships escorted without loss from Northern Ireland to Newfoundland
SC 109	MOEF group C3	15-27 Nov 1942	Newfoundland to Northern Ireland; 2 ships torpedoed (1 sank)
ON 152	MOEF group C3	10-19 Dec 1942	15 ships escorted without loss from Northern Ireland to Newfoundland
ON 184	MOEF group C1	16–25 May 1943	39 ships escorted without loss from Northern Ireland to Newfoundland
HX 242	MOEF group C1	6–14 June 1943	61 ships escorted without loss from Newfoundland to Northern Ireland
ON 190	MOEF group C1	25 June-3 July 1943	87 ships escorted without loss from Northern Ireland to Newfoundland
HX 247	Escort Group 9	14–19 July 1943	71 ships escorted without loss from Newfoundland to Northern Ireland
ON 195	Escort Group 9	1-8 Aug 1943	51 ships escorted without loss from Northern Ireland to Newfoundland
HX 252	Escort Group 9	20-27 Aug 1943	52 ships escorted without loss from Newfoundland to Northern Ireland
Convoys ONS 18/ON 202	Escort Group 9	19-25 Sep 1943	Northern Ireland to Newfoundland; 7 ships torpedoed (6 sank)
SC 143	MOEF group C2	2-11 Oct 1943	Newfoundland to Northern Ireland; 1 ship torpedoed & sunk
ONS 21	MOEF group C2	23 Oct-2 Nov 1943	33 ships escorted without loss from Northern Ireland to Newfoundland
HX 265	MOEF group C2	11-20 Nov 1943	51 ships escorted without loss from Newfoundland to Northern Ireland
ONS 24	MOEF group C2	1-13 Dec 1943	29 ships escorted without loss from Northern Ireland to Newfoundland
HX 271	MOEF group C2	22-29 Dec 1943	53 ships escorted without loss from Newfoundland to Northern Ireland
ONS 27	MOEF group C2	14-18 Jan 1944	32 ships escorted without loss from Northern Ireland to Newfoundland
ON 220	MOEF group C2	18-19 Jan 1944	54 ships escorted without loss from Northern Ireland to Newfoundland
HX 297	MOEF group C2	30 June-10 July 1944	116 ships escorted without loss from Newfoundland to Northern Ireland

== Civilian service ==
Most Flower-class corvettes were scrapped shortly after the war, however Sackville was laid up in reserve. She was reactivated in 1952 and converted to a research vessel for the Department of Marine and Fisheries. The armament was removed, the hull repainted black in place of the original dazzle camouflage and the new pennant number 532 painted on the hull (changed to 113 in the late 1950s). A laboratory was built on the aft superstructure in 1964 and the bridge enclosed in 1968. She remained in service until December 1982, with her last cruise in July 1982.

== Museum ship ==
The original intention had been to acquire HMCS Louisburg, which had been sold to the Dominican Republic and renamed Juan Alejandro Acosta but this vessel was wrecked (along with another Flower-class corvette - Cristobal Colon, the former HMCS Lachute) by Hurricane David in 1979. This left Sackville as the sole remaining Flower-class corvette.

The ship was transferred to the Canadian Naval Corvette Trust (now the Canadian Naval Memorial Trust) on 28 October 1983 and restored to her 1944 appearance (apart from minor details in her camouflage and the presence of the "barber pole" red and white pattern around her funnel which had been removed before 1944). It had originally been planned to restore the ship to her 1942 appearance but this proved too expensive.

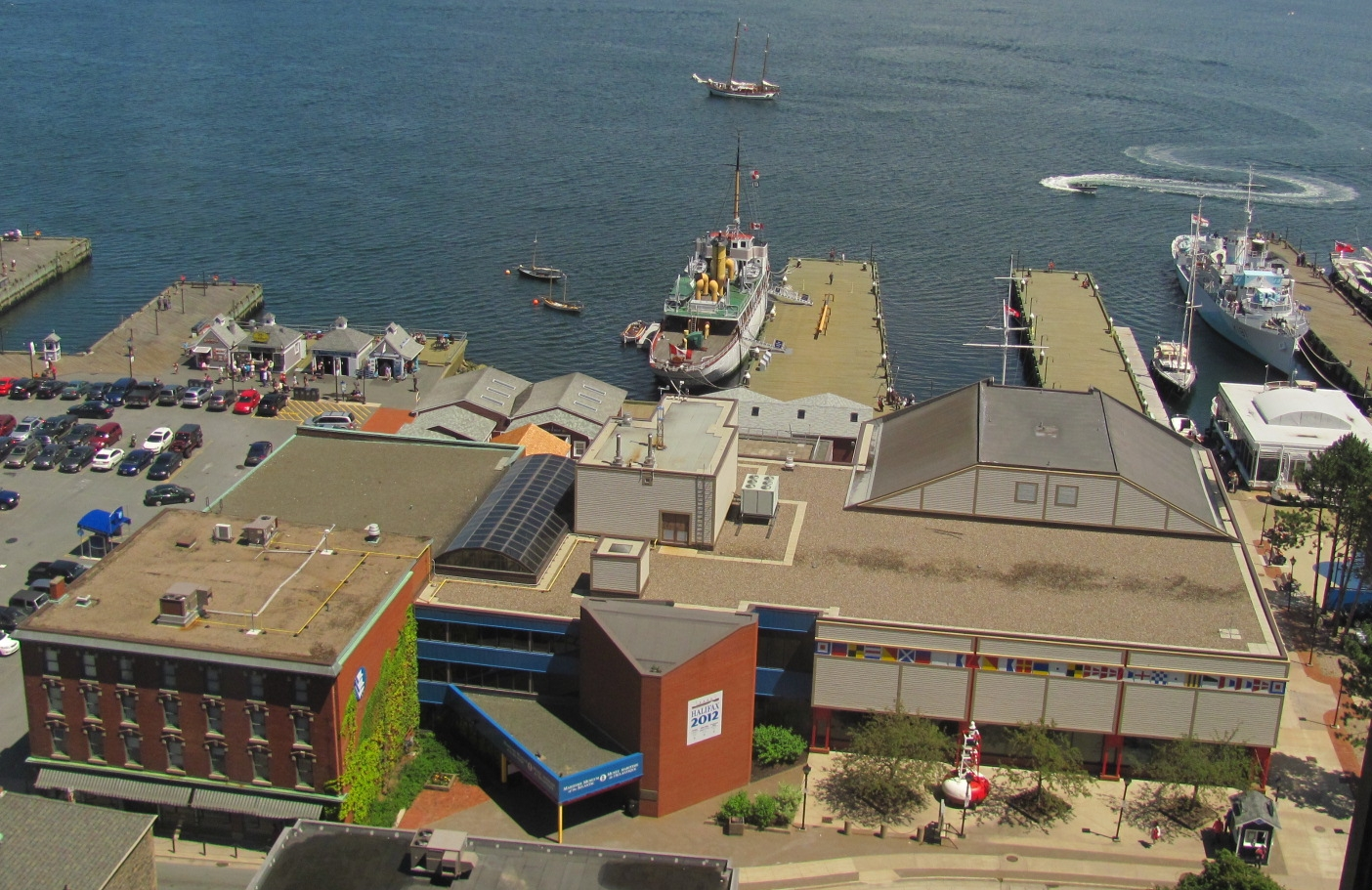
HMCS Sackville's summer location to the right, behind the Maritime Museum of the Atlantic at the foot of Sackville Street.

She currently serves the summer months as a museum ship moored beside the Maritime Museum of the Atlantic in Halifax, Nova Scotia, while spending her winters securely in the naval dockyard at CFB Halifax under the care of Maritime Forces Atlantic, the Atlantic fleet of Royal Canadian Navy. Sackville's presence in Halifax is considered appropriate, as the port was an important North American convoy assembly port during the war.

In September 2003, Sackville broke loose during Hurricane Juan and struck the schooner Larinda, a yacht inspired by the 1767 Boston schooner HMS Sultana, moored beside her. The schooner's owners sued the Naval Memorial Trust in 2009 but the Nova Scotia Supreme Court ruled in Sackville's favour on 4 August 2011, concluding that the Trust had taken all necessary and appropriate precautions to secure Sackville.

Sackville makes her first appearance each spring when she is towed by a naval tugboat from HMC Dockyard to a location off Point Pleasant Park on the first Sunday in May to participate in the Commemoration of the Battle of the Atlantic ceremonies held at a memorial in the park overlooking the entrance to Halifax Harbour. Sackville typically hosts several dozen Royal Canadian Navy veterans on this day and has also participated in several burials at sea for dispersing the ashes of Royal Canadian Navy veterans of the Battle of the Atlantic at this location. In 2018, the ship underwent CAN$3.5 million in repairs at CFB Halifax.

== Recognition ==
In 1988, Sackville was designated a National Historic Site of Canada, due to her status as the last Flower-class corvette known to exist.

On 4 November 1998, Canada Post issued a 45¢ stamp featuring HMCS Sackville as part of the Naval Vessels series. The stamps were designed by Dennis George Page, based on an illustration by Todd Hawkins and on photographs by Canadian Naval Memorial Trust.

== Greyhound ==
HMCS Sackville was used as the model for the corvette, HMCS Dodge, call sign Dicky, in the 2020 film, Greyhound. The producers of the movie took numerous 3D scans of the ship's exterior to create the CGI version for the movie.

== Gallery ==
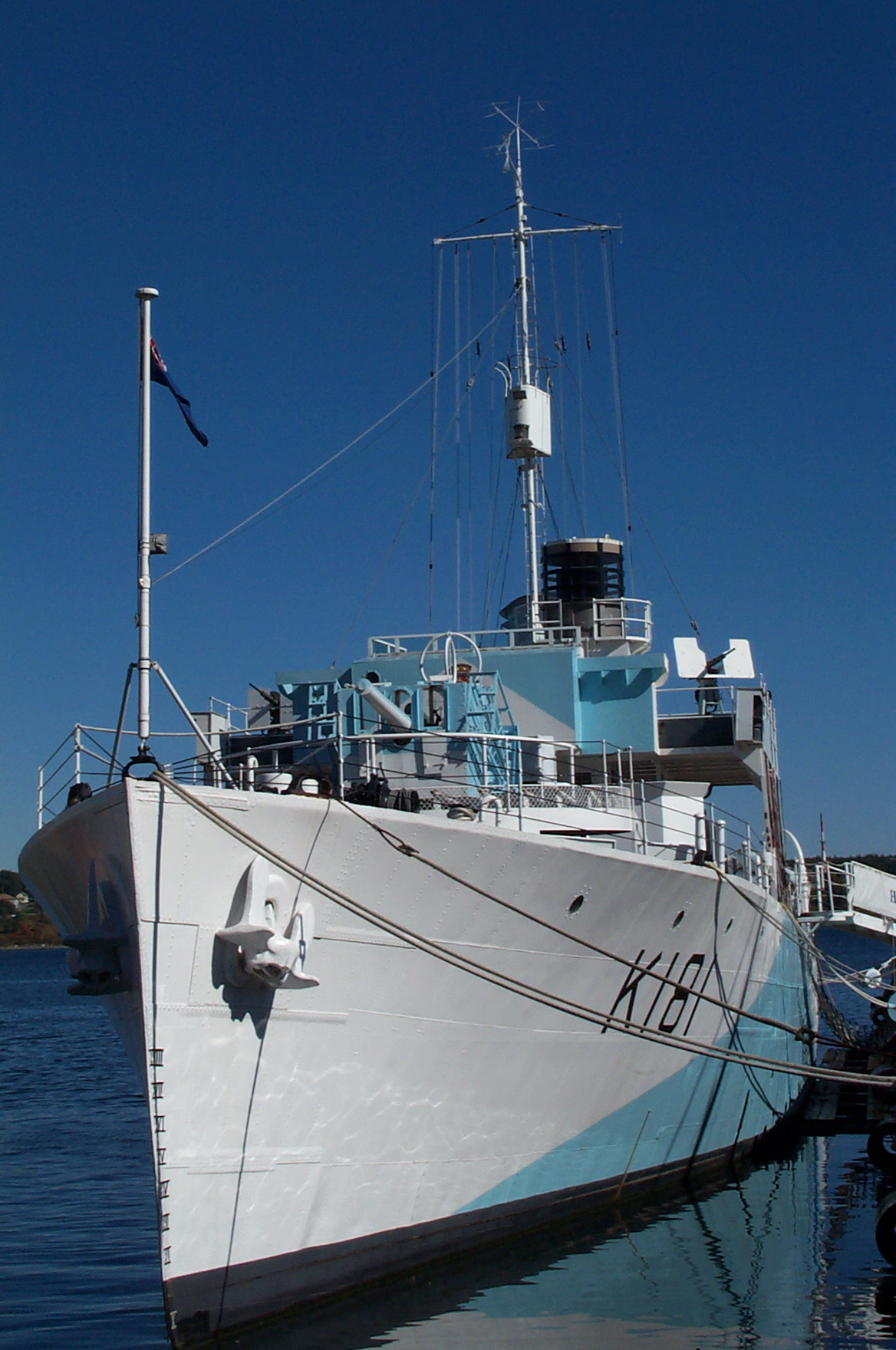
Sackville as restored, moored alongside the Maritime Museum of the Atlantic in Halifax, Canada. The paint scheme on her hull is dazzle camouflage.

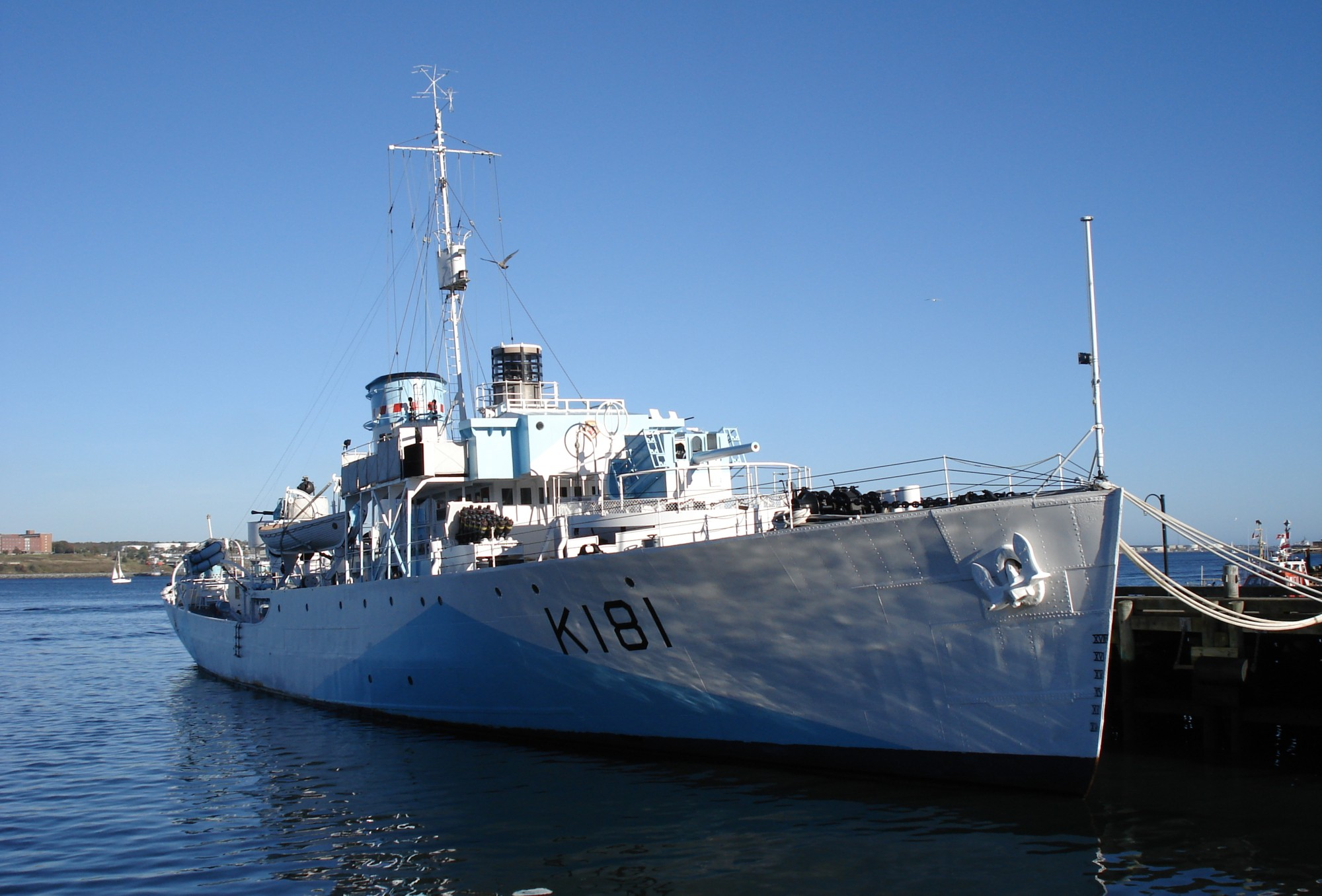
Sackville, Halifax Harbour, October 2006.

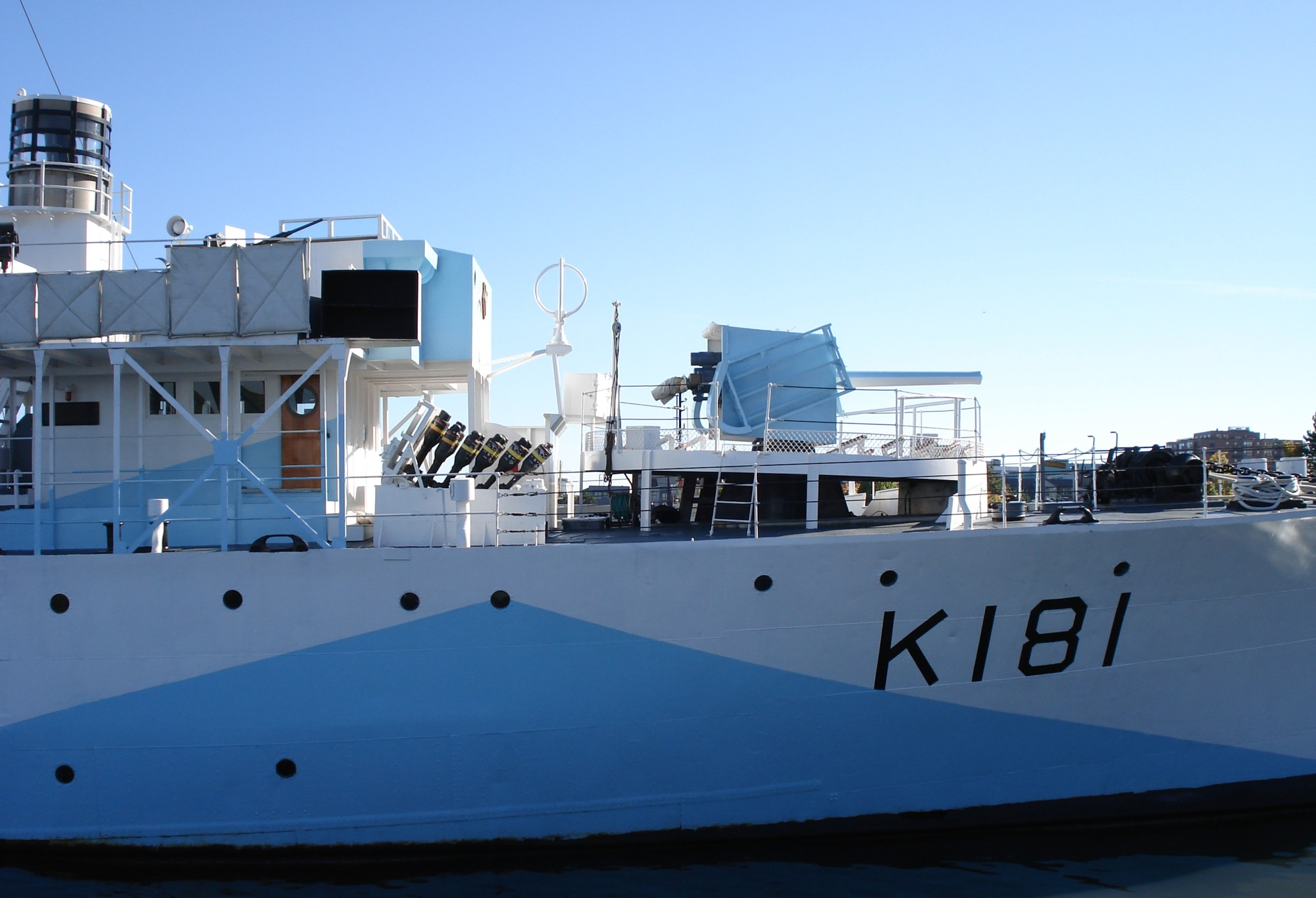
Sackville, Halifax Harbour, October 2006 showing the four-inch deck gun and Hedgehog anti-submarine mortar. The lighthouse-like structure behind the bridge contains the radar.

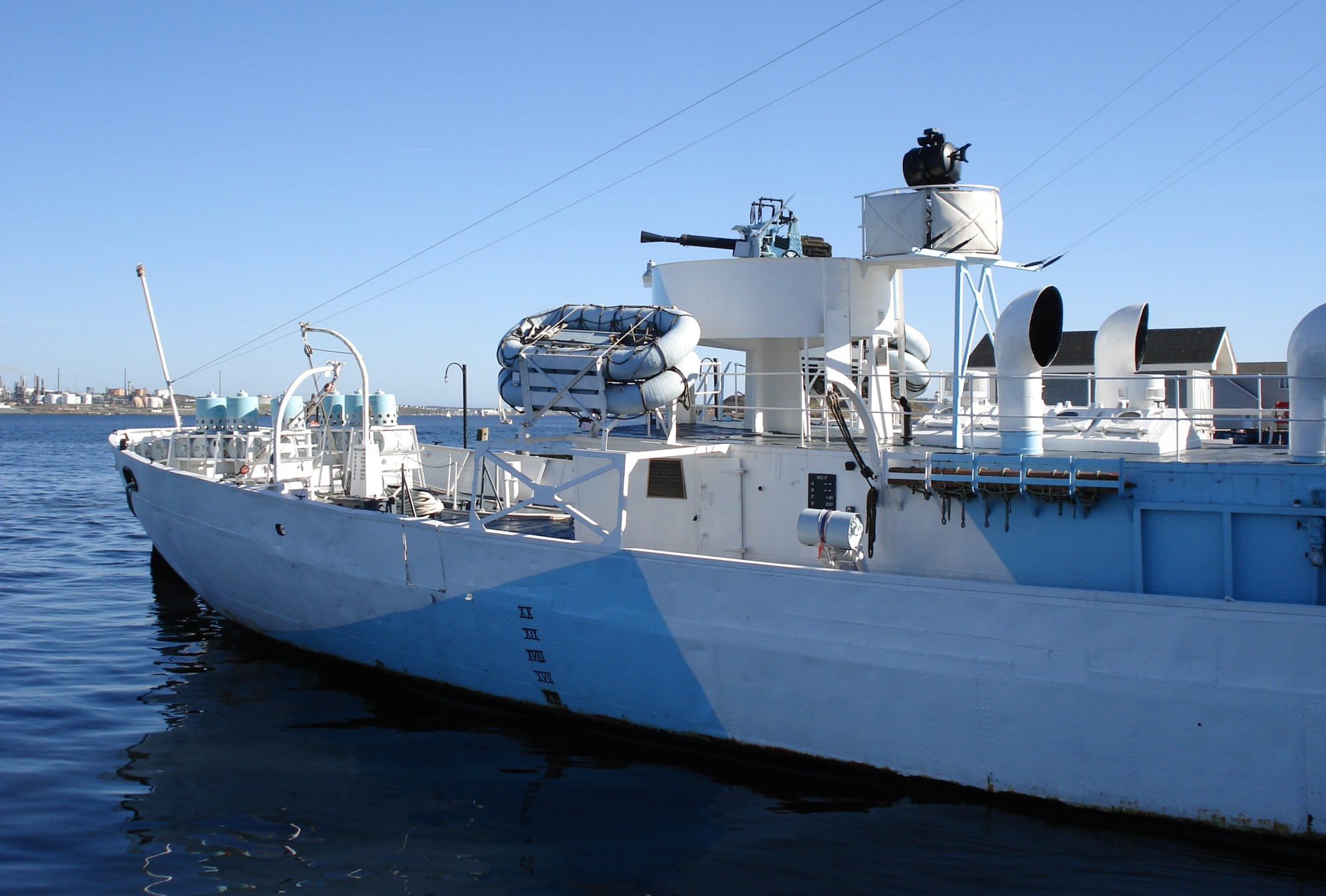
Sackville, Halifax Harbour, October 2006, showing the 40 mm anti-aircraft gun and depth charge releasing device at stern of ship.

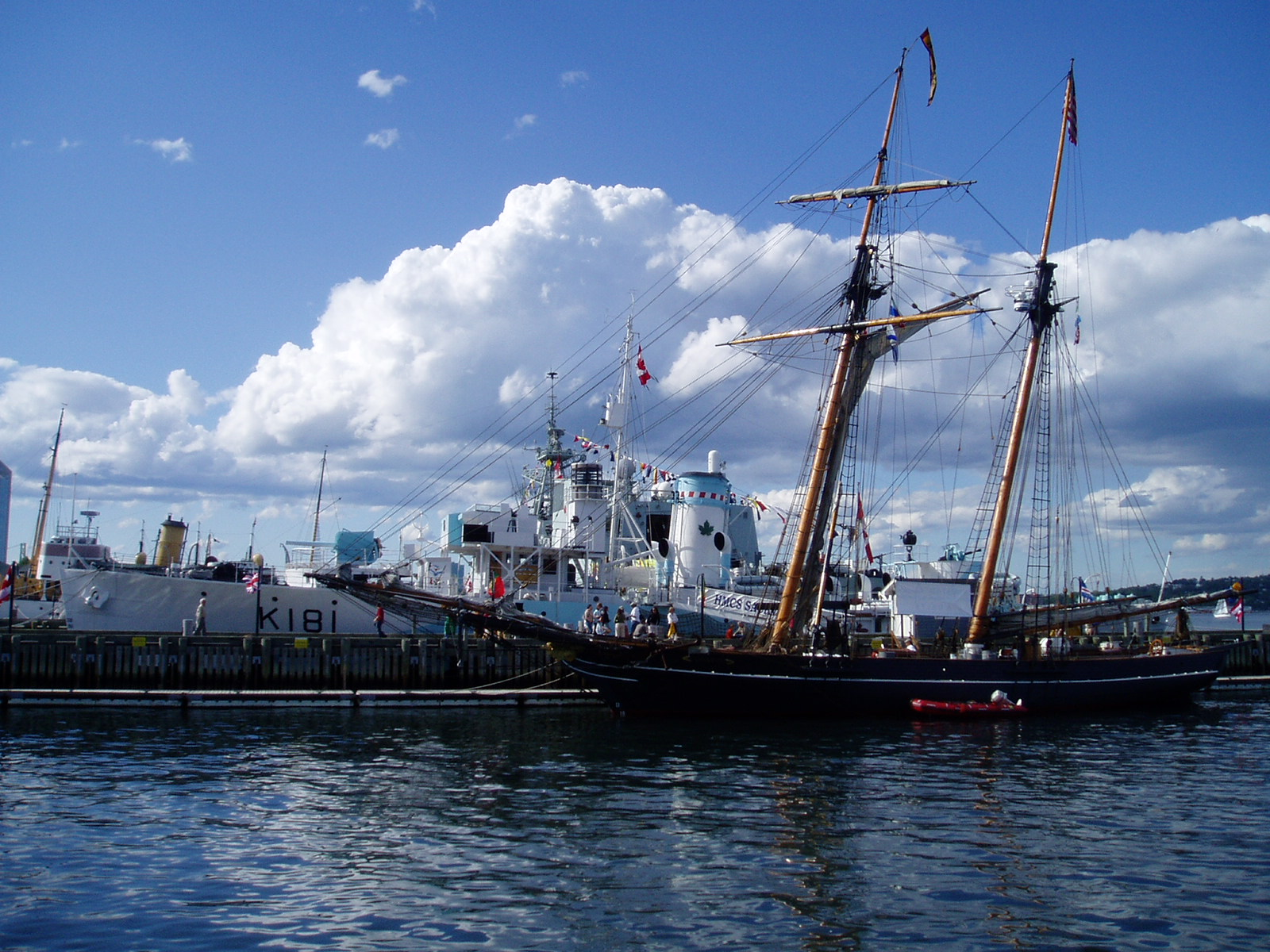
Sackville, Halifax Harbour, 1 July 2007, alongside a 2-masted sailing ship. A green maple leaf badge is visible on the ship's funnel, a common insignia of Royal Canadian Navy during World War II.

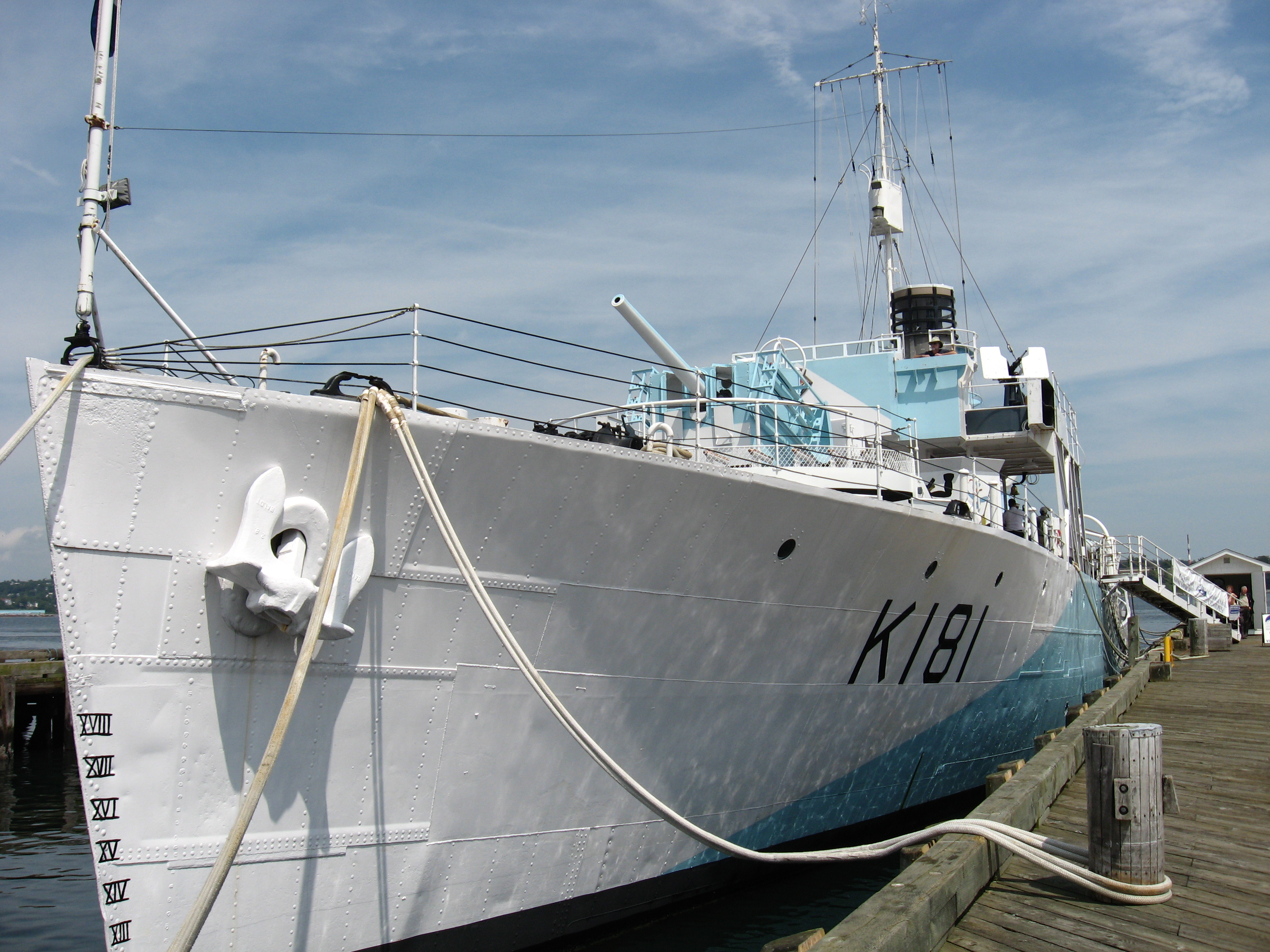
Bow view

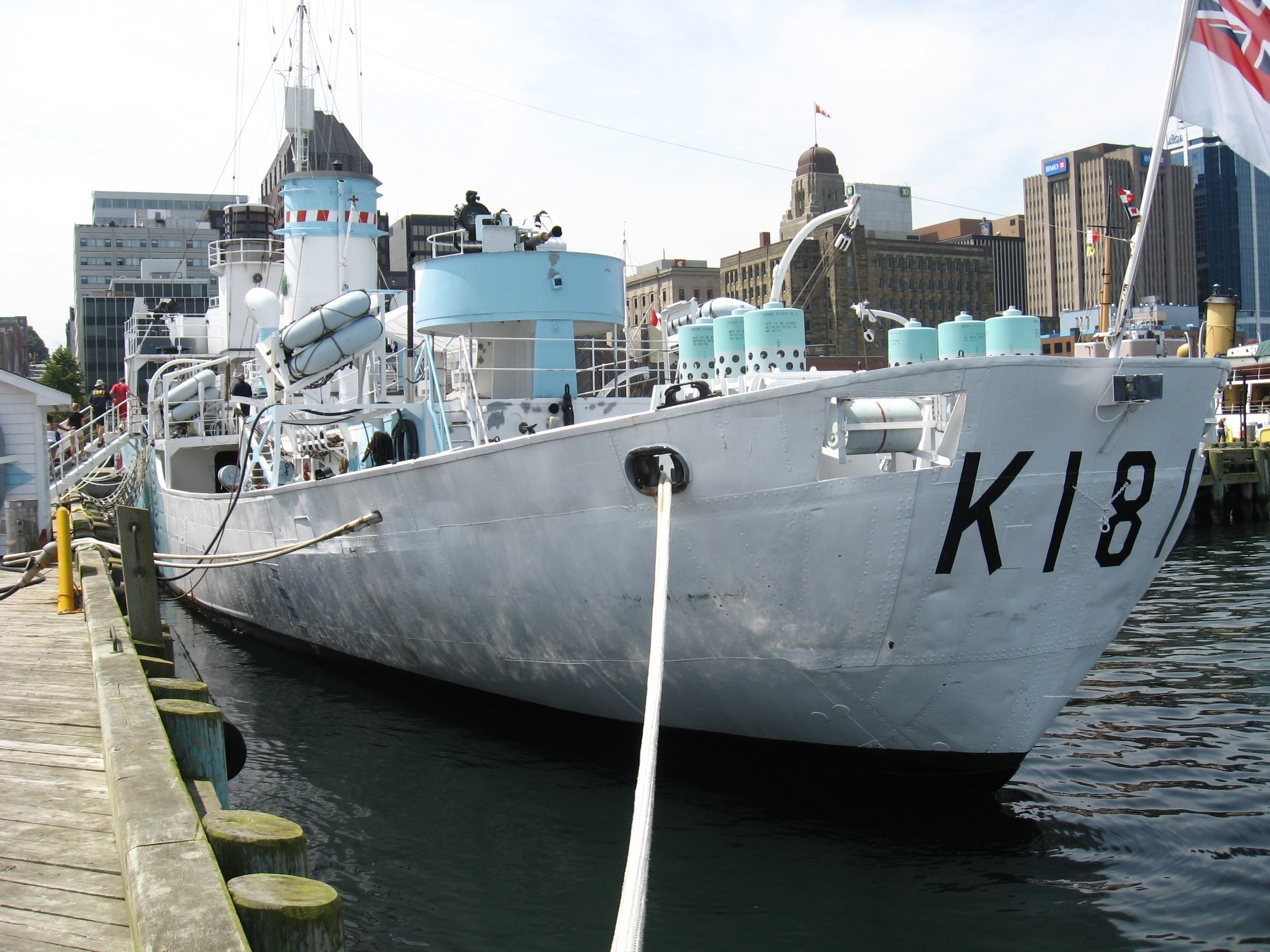
Stern view

== See also ==
- List of ships of the Canadian Navy
- List of museum ships
- Ship replica
- Ships preserved in museums

== Bibliography ==
- Lynch, Thomas G. (1981). Canada's Flowers: History of the Corvettes of Canada. Halifax, Nova Scotia: Nimbus Publishing Limited. ISBN 0-920852-15-7.
- Milner, Marc (1998). HMCS Sackville: 1941-1985. Halifax, Nova Scotia: The Canadian Naval Memorial Trust. ISBN 0-9683661-0-4.
