= HMCS Louisburg =

Two ships of the Royal Canadian Navy have been named HMCS Louisburg :

- HMCS Louisburg (K143) (I) was a Flower-class corvette that served in the Battle of the Atlantic before being sunk in 1943.
- HMCS Louisburg (K401) (II) was a modified Flower-class corvette that served in the Battle of the Atlantic from 1943 to 1945.

== Battle honours ==
- Atlantic 1941–42, 1944–45
- Normandy 1944
- English Channel 1944
