= Thompson Bros. Machinery Co. Ltd. =

Shipbuilding and repair facility

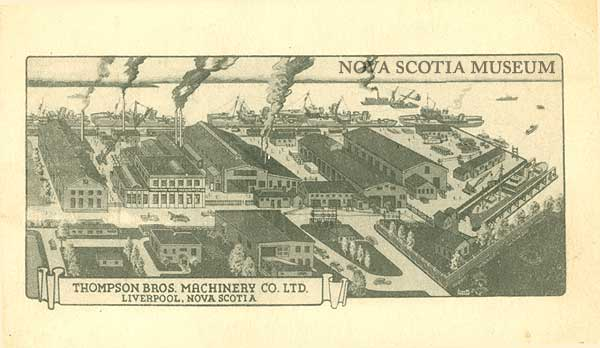
Postcard illustration of the facilities in 1930.

Thompson Bros. Machinery Co. Ltd. was a family owned and operated shipbuilding and repair facility located in Liverpool, Queens County, Nova Scotia. Founded in the early 1900s, it continued to operate under different owners until 2004. The shipyard was notable for its World War II work refitting large numbers of corvettes for the Royal Canadian Navy.

== History ==
The company was founded in the early 1900s and focused on small ship repair as well as small craft construction. It is possible that the company also got into the sales of motor vehicles in the early 1930s. The company saw a large boom during the Second World War the construction of a number of small harbour patrol craft as well as refitting and maintenance large numbers of Royal Canadian Navy ships, notably corvettes.

Canadian ships refitted at Thompson Brothers included HMCS Sackville, HMCS Ville de Quebec and HMCS Barrie. The yard grew to occupy much of the west bank of the Mersey River (Nova Scotia) in Liverpool's downtown. After the war, the company became Steel and Engine Products Limited (STENPRO) and worked mainly in fishing boat construction, repair and supply. The yard was eventually bought by Irving Shipbuilding; and closed in September 2004.

== See also ==
- Victoria Machinery Depot
- Polson Iron Works Limited
