= HMCS Lachute =

Modified Flower-class corvette

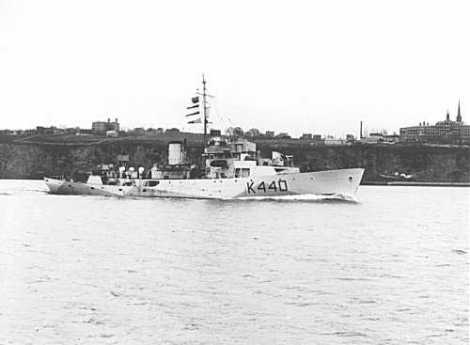
- HMCS Lachute

History

Canada
- Name: HMCS Lachute
- Namesake: Lachute, Quebec
- Ordered: June 1942
- Builder: Morton Engineering & Dry Dock Co., Quebec City
- Laid down: 24 November 1943
- Launched: 9 June 1944
- Commissioned: 26 October 1944
- Decommissioned: 10 July 1945
- Identification: Pennant number: K440
- Honours and awards: Atlantic 1945
- Fate: Sold to Dominican Republic in 1947

Dominican Republic
- Name: Cristobal Colon
- Acquired: purchased from Canada
- Commissioned: 1947
- Decommissioned: 1978
- Identification: C101
- Fate: Removed from active list 1978; wrecked 1979

General characteristics
- Class & type: Modified Flower-class corvette
- Displacement: 1,015 long tons (1,031 t; 1,137 short tons)
- Length: 208 ft (63.4 m)o/a
- Beam: 33 ft (10.1 m)
- Draught: 11 ft (3.35 m)
- Installed power: 2,750 ihp (2,050 kW); 2 × water tube boilers
- Propulsion: single shaft; 1 × 4-cylinder triple-expansion reciprocating steam engine
- Speed: 16 knots (29.6 km/h)
- Range: 3,500 nautical miles (6,482 km) at 12 knots (22.2 km/h)
- Complement: 90
- Sensors & processing systems: 1 × Type 271 SW2C radar; 1 × Type 144 sonar
- Armament: 1 × 4 in (102 mm) BL Mk.IX single gun; 1 × 2-pdr. Mk.VIII single "pom-pom" AA gun; 2 × 20 mm Oerlikon single; 1 × Hedgehog A/S mortar; 4 × Mk.II depth charge throwers; 2 depth charge rails with 70 depth charges

HMCS Lachute was a modified Flower-class corvette that served with the Royal Canadian Navy during the Second World War. She saw action primarily in the Battle of the Atlantic as a convoy escort. She was named for Lachute, Quebec. After the war she was sold to the Dominican Navy.

== Background ==
Flower-class corvettes like Lachute serving with the Royal Canadian Navy during the Second World War were different from earlier and more traditional sail-driven corvettes. The "corvette" designation was created by the French as a class of small warships; the Royal Navy borrowed the term for a period but discontinued its use in 1877. During the hurried preparations for war in the late 1930s, Winston Churchill reactivated the corvette class, needing a name for smaller ships used in an escort capacity, in this case based on a whaling ship design. The generic name "flower" was used to designate the class of these ships, which – in the Royal Navy – were named after flowering plants.

Corvettes commissioned by the Royal Canadian Navy during the Second World War were named after communities for the most part, to better represent the people who took part in building them. This idea was put forth by Admiral Percy W. Nelles. Sponsors were commonly associated with the community for which the ship was named. Royal Navy corvettes were designed as open sea escorts, while Canadian corvettes were developed for coastal auxiliary roles which was exemplified by their minesweeping gear. Eventually the Canadian corvettes would be modified to allow them to perform better on the open seas.

== Construction ==
Lachute was ordered in June 1942 as part of the 1943–44 Increased Endurance Flower-class building program, which followed the main layout of the 1942–43 program. The only significant difference is that the majority of the 43–44 program replaced the 2-pounder Mk.VIII single "pom-pom" anti-aircraft gun with 2 twin 20-mm and 2 single 20-mm anti-aircraft guns. She was laid down 24 November 1943 by Morton Engineering & Dry Dock Co. in Quebec City. She was launched on 9 June 1944 and commissioned at Quebec City later that year on 26 October.

== Service history ==
After being worked up in Bermuda Lachute was assigned to the Mid-Ocean Escort Force. She was allocated to escort group EG C-5. She served the rest of the war as a trans-Atlantic Ocean escort and participated in the final westbound convoy ON 305 on 26 May 1945.

Lachute was paid off on 10 July 1945 and placed in reserve at Sorel. She was transferred to the War Assets Corporation and was sold to Dominican Republic in 1947. Renamed Cristobal Colon she served as a coastal escort until 1978 when she was removed from the active list. On 31 August 1979, Hurricane David struck the island. Cristobal Colon, along with her sister ship, Juan Alejandro Acosta, were driven ashore and wrecked.
