= HMCS Louisburg (K401) =

Modified Flower-class corvette

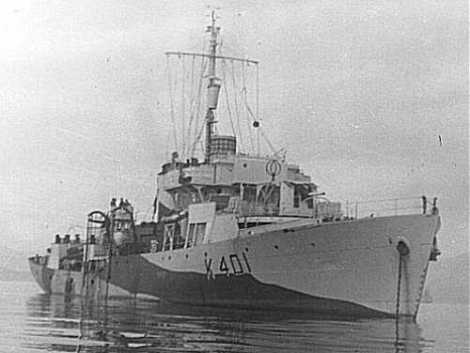
- HMCS Louisburg

History

Canada
- Name: HMCS Louisburg
- Namesake: Louisburg, Nova Scotia
- Ordered: 2 January 1942
- Builder: Morton Engineering and Dry Dock Co., Quebec City
- Laid down: 11 January 1943
- Launched: 13 July 1943
- Commissioned: 13 December 1943
- Decommissioned: 25 June 1945
- Identification: Pennant number: K401
- Honours and awards: Atlantic 1944–45, English Channel 1944, Normandy 1944
- Fate: Sold to Dominican Navy 1947

Dominican Republic
- Name: Juan Alejandro Acosta
- Acquired: purchased from Canada
- Commissioned: 1947
- Decommissioned: 1978
- Fate: Removed from active list 1978; wrecked 1979

General characteristics
- Class & type: Flower-class corvette (modified)
- Displacement: 1,015 long tons (1,031 t; 1,137 short tons)
- Length: 208 ft (63.40 m)o/a
- Beam: 33 ft (10.06 m)
- Draught: 11 ft (3.35 m)
- Propulsion: single shaft; 2 × oil fired water tube boilers; 1 triple-expansion reciprocating steam engine; 2,750 ihp (2,050 kW)
- Speed: 16 knots (29.6 km/h)
- Range: 7,400 nautical miles (13,705 km) at 10 knots (18.5 km/h)
- Complement: 90
- Sensors & processing systems: 1 Type 271 SW2C radar; 1 Type 144 sonar
- Armament: 1 × 4 in (102 mm) QF Mk XIX naval gun; 1 × 2-pounder Mk.VIII single "pom-pom"; 2 × 20 mm Oerlikon single; 1 × Hedgehog A/S mortar; 4 × Mk.II depth charge throwers; 2 × depth charge rails with 70 depth charges

HMCS Louisburg was a modified Flower-class corvette that served with the Royal Canadian Navy during the Second World War. She fought primarily in the Battle of the Atlantic as a convoy escort. She was named for Louisburg, Nova Scotia. She was the second ship named for the town, the first having been sunk earlier in the war. She was sold to the Dominican Navy after the war.

== Background ==
Flower-class corvettes like Louisburg serving with the Royal Canadian Navy during the Second World War were different from earlier and more traditional sail-driven corvettes. The "corvette" designation was created by the French as a class of small warships; the Royal Navy borrowed the term for a period but discontinued its use in 1877. During the hurried preparations for war in the late 1930s, Winston Churchill reactivated the corvette class, needing a name for smaller ships used in an escort capacity, in this case based on a whaling ship design. The generic name "flower" was used to designate the class of these ships, which – in the Royal Navy – were named after flowering plants.

Corvettes commissioned by the Royal Canadian Navy during the Second World War were named after communities for the most part, to better represent the people who took part in building them. This idea was put forth by Admiral Percy W. Nelles. Sponsors were commonly associated with the community for which the ship was named. Royal Navy corvettes were designed as open sea escorts, while Canadian corvettes were developed for coastal auxiliary roles which was exemplified by their minesweeping gear. Eventually the Canadian corvettes would be modified to allow them to perform better on the open seas.

== Construction ==
Louisburg was ordered 2 January 1942 as part of the 1942–43 modified Flower-class building programme. This programme was known as the Increased Endurance. Many changes were made, all from lessons that had been learned in previous versions of the Flower-class. The bridge was made a full deck higher and built to naval standards instead of the more civilian-like bridges of previous versions. The platform for the 4-inch main gun was raised to minimize the amount of spray over it and to provide a better field of fire. It was also connected to the wheelhouse by a wide platform that was now the base for the Hedgehog anti-submarine mortar that this version was armed with. Along with the new Hedgehog, this version got the new QF 4-inch Mk XIX main gun, which was semi-automatic, used fixed ammunition and had the ability to elevate higher giving it an anti-aircraft ability.

Other superficial changes to this version include an upright funnel and pressurized boiler rooms which eliminated the need for hooded ventilators around the base of the funnel. This changes the silhouette of the corvette and made it more difficult for submariners to tell which way the corvette was laying.

Louisburg was laid down by Morton Engineering and Dry Dock Co. at Quebec City, Quebec 11 January 1943 and was launched 13 July 1943. She was commissioned into the Royal Canadian Navy 13 December 1943 at Quebec City. Louisburg underwent one refit during her career beginning in March 1945 at Saint John, New Brunswick.

== Service history ==
After workups Louisburg was assigned as an unallocated unit to the Western Approaches Command. She arrived in April 1944 and spent the next four months performing duties associated with the invasion of Normandy. In September 1944 she was assigned to escort group EG 41 under Plymouth Command. She remained with this unit until March 1945 when she returned to Canada and underwent refit. She did not return to active service before the end of the war.

Louisburg was paid off at Sorel, Quebec 25 June 1945 and placed in reserve. She was transferred to the War Assets Corporation and sold to the Dominican Navy. She was renamed Juan Alejandro Acosta, after the famous Dominican admiral and entered service in 1947. She remained in service until being removed from the active list in 1978. She was driven ashore and wrecked during a hurricane alongside her sister Cristobal Colon in August 1979.
