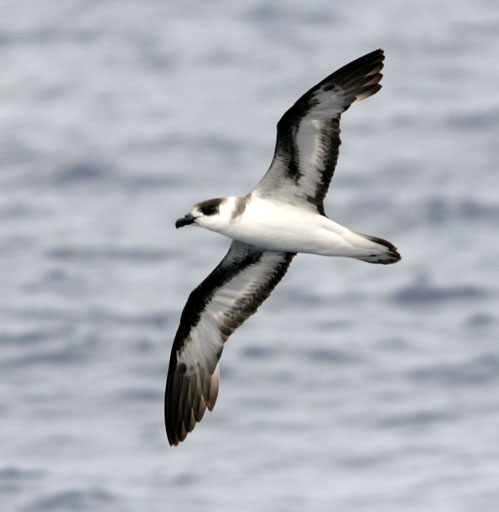

Conservation status
- Endangered (IUCN 3.1)

- Endangered (ESA)

Scientific classification
- Kingdom: Animalia
- Phylum: Chordata
- Class: Aves
- Order: Procellariiformes
- Family: Procellariidae
- Genus: Pterodroma
- Species: P. hasitata

Binomial name
- Pterodroma hasitata (Kuhl, 1820)

= Black-capped petrel =

Species of bird

The black-capped petrel (Pterodroma hasitata), also known as the diablotín, is a small seabird native to the West Indies in the genus Pterodroma. It is a long-winged petrel with a grey-brown back and wings, with a white nape and rump. Underparts are mainly white apart from a black cap (that in some individuals extends to cover the eye) and some dark underwing markings. It picks food items such as squid from the ocean surface.

== Description ==
The black-capped petrel is large compared to other gadfly petrels, with a length of about 16 inches (40.5 cm) and 37 inches (94 cm) wingspan. The most similar species within its range is the Bermuda petrel, which is smaller and has a narrower white rump patch and an extensive gray cowl. The great shearwater is also superficially similar. The critically endangered or possibly extinct Jamaica petrel (P. caribbaea) was a related dark form. The local Spanish name, Diablotín, means "little devil" because of its night-time habits and odd-sounding mating calls, which suggested to locals the presence of evil spirits in the dark. The petrel will occasionally utter other croaks and sounds while foraging at sea.

The black-capped petrel is nocturnal on its breeding grounds, possibly to avoid predation by gulls, hawks or crows. Like most petrels, its walking ability is limited to a short shuffle to the nest burrow.

== Taxonomy ==
There are two variants of the black-capped petrel; a dark or black-faced form, and a light or white-faced form. Genetic evidence of divergence suggests that these two color morphs represent distinct breeding populations. Satellite tracking also revealed that the two populations likely breed in different locations at different times, with a light form individual visiting a nest in the central Dominican Republic in October, and a dark form individual visiting a nest in southeastern Haiti in November and December. However, it is unclear whether these populations represent separate species or subspecies. Intermediate birds showing features of both populations are known to exist.

== Distribution and habitat ==
=== Range ===
Although this seabird once bred on steep mountainsides of the Greater Antilles, only three confirmed breeding areas remain in the high mountains of Hispaniola (in Sierra de Bahoruco and Valle Nuevo National Park in the Dominican Republic, and Massif de la Selle and Massif de la Hotte in Haiti). In 2015, birds were also confirmed nesting on a second island (Dominica), which had long been suspected given historical nesting there. A mountain peak where it formerly bred in Haiti (and another in Dominica) is still named "Mont Diablotin" in reference to the "little devil" moniker.

The warm waters of the Gulf Stream serve as the primary foraging area for this species. Most birds during the non-breeding season are concentrated off the United States coast between Florida and North Carolina, though they have been known to wander far to the north and east toward Europe. The species has been seen year-round in the Gulf Stream. The birds that visit these waters during the breeding season either represent non-breeders or are making long foraging trips away from the nest. The black-capped petrel is almost strictly pelagic away from the breeding grounds and is known to join loose flocks with other seabirds such as shearwaters and terns.

=== Nesting ===
Like other gadfly petrels, the black-capped petrel nests in burrows in remote highland areas of islands. These burrows are typically located on forested cliffs, and are very difficult to locate. They visit burrows at night, so as to avoid detection by predators. Eggs are typically laid in January, which will subsequently hatch sometime in March. Fledglings will then depart the nest in either June or July.

== Conservation ==
The species, once abundant in the Caribbean, has declined significantly and is now one of the most endangered seabirds in the North Atlantic along with the Bermuda petrel. In the early 20th century, there was speculation that the black-capped petrel was extinct or nearing extinction, but more current population estimates range from 2,000 to 4,000 individuals. In 1963, an expedition led by David Wingate discovered 11 breeding colonies in Haiti. Most of the threats facing the black-capped petrel are on its nesting grounds, where causes for its demise include habitat loss, introduced predators, and direct harvesting by humans. Human predation appears to have become more limited in scope than in historic times, due in part to the species' current scarcity. Deforestation from wildfires and direct human use have likely decreased the amount of suitable nesting habitat available to the black-capped petrel. This is especially true in Haiti, which has suffered severe loss of forest cover in recent years.

Current conservation plans for the petrel largely involve preserving forest cover around known nesting areas as well as monitoring and searching for burrows. There are also concerns that hydrocarbon exploration off of the Southeast United States could negatively affect the species' continued survival. In 2018, the US Fish and Wildlife Service proposed listing the black-capped petrel as threatened. On 1 May 2023, a new 30-day comment period was opened due to concerns that threats to the species are greater than previously assessed.

== Bibliography ==
- Dod, Annabelle Stockton (1978). Aves de la República Dominicana. Museo Nacional de Historia Natural, Santo Domingo, Dominican Republic.
- Dod, A. S. (1992). Endangered and Endemic Birds of the Dominican Republic. Cypress House ISBN 1-879384-12-4
- Latta, Steven; et al. (2006). Aves de la República Dominicana y Haití. Princeton University Press. ISBN 0-691-12876-6
- Howell, Steve N. G. (2012). Petrels, Albatrosses & Storm-Petrels of North America. Princeton University Press. p. 168-171. ISBN 978-0-691-14211-1.
