= Amblycirrhitus =

- Amblycirrhitus pinos

Scientific classification
- Kingdom: Animalia
- Phylum: Chordata
- Class: Actinopterygii
- Division: Teleostei
- Order: Centrarchiformes
- Family: Cirrhitidae
- Genus: Amblycirrhitus; T. N. Gill, 1862

Type species
- Cirrhites fasciatus G. Cuvier, 1829

Synonyms
- Cirrhitoidea Jenkins, 1903; Pseudocirrhites Mowbray, 1927

Genus of fishes

Amblycirrhitus is a genus of ray-finned fishes, hawkfishes belonging to the family Cirrhitidae. These fishes are found on tropical reefs worldwide.

== Taxonomy ==
Amblycirrhitus was originally described as a genus in 1862 by the American ichthyologist Theodore Nicholas Gill with the type species designated as Cirrhites fasciatus, which is a synonym of Amblycirrhitus pinos, as this name for a taxon described in 1829 by Cuvier’s was preoccupied. The genus name is a compound of ambly which means “blunt” which Gill did not explain but which may be an allusion to the “abbreviated” head of the type species or possibly of its “slightly convex” snout, and Cirrhitus, the type genus of family.

== Species ==
The currently recognized species in this genus are:

- Amblycirrhitus bimacula (O. P. Jenkins, 1903) (twospot hawkfish)
- Amblycirrhitus earnshawi Lubbock, 1978
- Amblycirrhitus oxyrhynchos (Bleeker, 1858)
- Amblycirrhitus pinos (Mowbray, 1927) (redspotted hawkfish)
- Amblycirrhitus unimacula (Kamohara, 1957)

== Characteristics ==
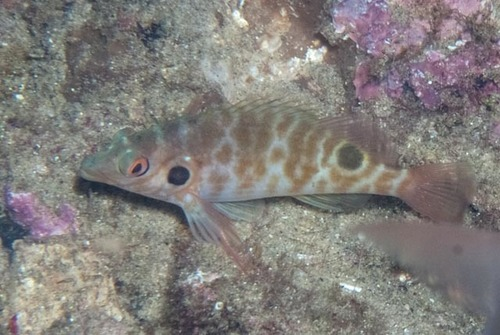
Amblycirrhitus bimacula

Amblycirrhitus hawkfishes have moderately compressed oval-shaped bodies with a short, sharp snout over a moderately large mouth. The jaws have an outer row of small canine-like teeth and an inner band of simple teeth and there are teeth on the palatine. They have the uppermost 1 or 2 and the lowest 5 (occasionally 6) pectoral fin rays without branches, these are shorter than the upper unbranched rays. The pectoral fins are reasonably long, at least extending as far as the anus and often as far as the anal fin. They have 11-12 soft rays in the dorsal fin, each dorsal fin spine has a tuft of cirri on the membrane close to the spine and each dorsal fin membrane is deeply notched, with the deepest between the fourth and fifth spine. The preoperculum has serrations on its upper margin. These fish have bodies which have a depth which is roughly a quarter to a third of the standard length. These fish vary in total length between 5.2 and 9.5 cm (2.0 and 3.7 in)

== Distribution and habitat ==
Amblycirrhitus hawkfishes are found in the eastern and western Atlantic Ocean, the Indian Ocean and the Pacific Ocean. They are found on hard substrates such as coral and rocky reefs and rocky seabeds.
