= Redspotted hawkfish =

Conservation status
- Least Concern (IUCN 3.1)

Scientific classification
- Kingdom: Animalia
- Phylum: Chordata
- Class: Actinopterygii
- Division: Teleostei
- Order: Centrarchiformes
- Family: Cirrhitidae
- Genus: Amblycirrhitus
- Species: A. pinos

Binomial name
- Amblycirrhitus pinos (Mowbray, 1927)

Synonyms
- Pseudocirrhites pinos Mowbray, 1927; Cirrhites fasciatus Cuvier, 1829 (invalid)

Species of fish

The redspotted hawkfish (Amblycirrhitus pinos) is a species of marine ray-finned fish, a hawkfish belonging to the family Cirrhitidae. It is found at depths from 2 to 46 m (6.6 to 150.9 ft) on tropical reefs in the Western Atlantic. The Redspotted Hawkfish is also found in the aquarium trade.

== Taxonomy ==
The redspotted hawkfish was first formally described as Pseudocirrhites pinos in 1927 by the Bermudan naturalist Louis L. Mowbray with the type locality given as Point Francis on the Isle of Pines in Cuba. In 1829 the French zoologist Georges Cuvier described a species he called Cirrhites fasciatus, giving it a type locality of Puducherry in India. This is now considered to be an error, since the fish described most likely came from the Atlantic Ocean. When Theodore Nicholas Gill described the genus Amblycirrhitus in 1861 he used Cuvier's C. fasciatus as its type species. However, Cuvier's name was preoccupied by Edward Turner Bennett's 1828 usage of the name for a related species, A. pinos is the type species of Amblycirrhitus under Cuvier's invalid name. Mowbray's specific name pinos refers to the Isle of Pines.

== Distribution and habitat ==
At the U.S. Virgin Islands

The redspotted hawkfish is found in the western Atlantic Ocean at depths shallower than 46 m (151 ft). It is common in rocky areas and where there is rubble, and frequently occupies crevices and small caves.

Its habitat includes Bermuda and the Bahamas, the Florida Keys, Cedar Key off of Florida, the Flower Garden Banks and surrounding area in the Gulf of Mexico; the area ranging from Tuxpan, Mexico along the northern coast of the Yucatan Peninsula to northwestern Cuba. It also occurs throughout the Caribbean including the Isla de Aves. To the south it is found along the South American coast as far as Rio de Janeiro, Brazil, as well as at Trindade Island.

== Description ==
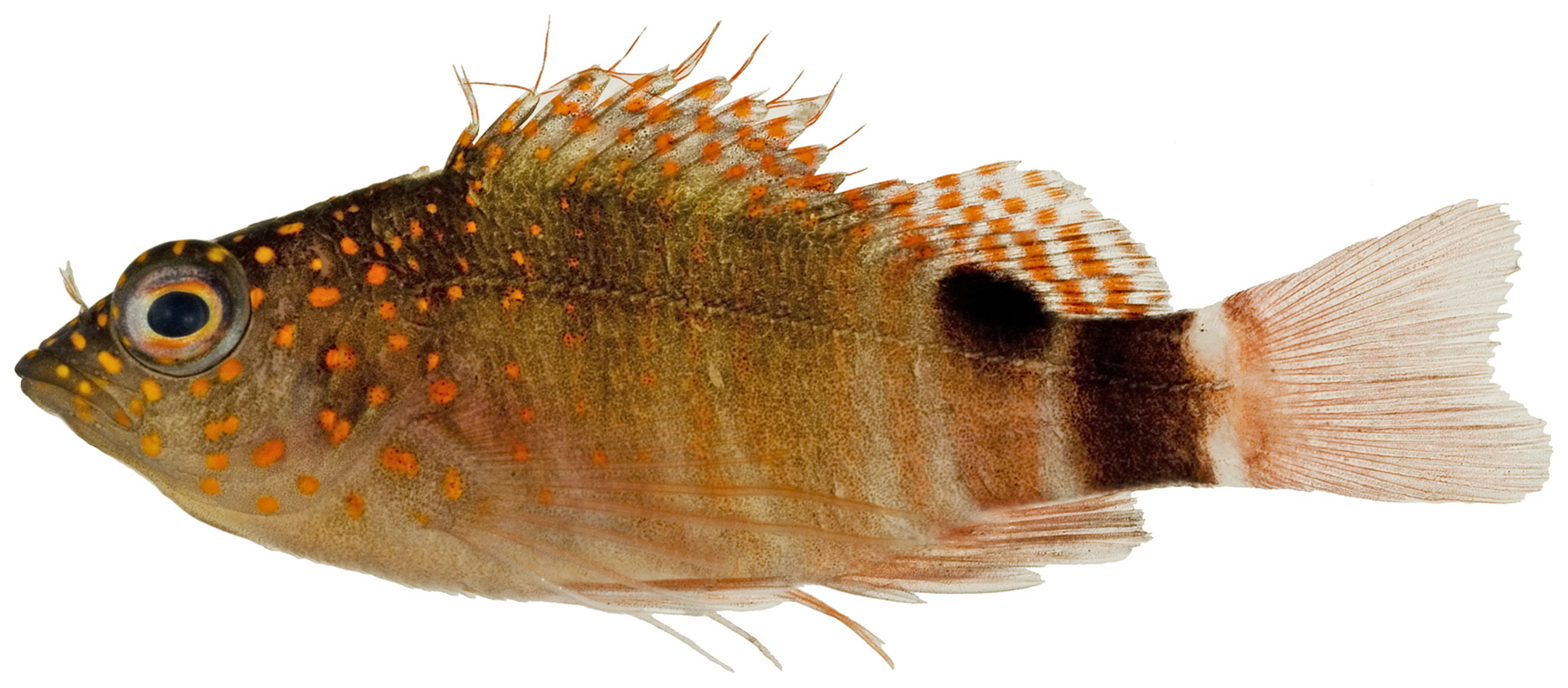
22.6 mm SL specimen from Saba Bank

At Grand Cayman

The redspotted hawkfish has an oval, moderately compressed body with a short, sharp snout and a fringe of cirri on the posterior margin of the anterior nostril. It has a moderately large mouth which has a row of small canine-like teeth on the outside of the jaws and a band of simple teeth inside the outer row. It has teeth on the middle and sides of the roof of the mouth. The gill cover has a pair of flattened spines and the preoperculum has fine serrations. The dorsal fin is continuous with a small incision between the spiny part and the soft rayed part. The dorsal fin has 10 spines and 11 soft rays while the anal fin has 3 spines and 8 soft rays. The membranes between the dorsal fin spines are deeply notched and each spine has a tuft of cirri at its tip. The caudal fin is truncate. There are 5-7 robust rays at the lower part of the pectoral fin which have the membranes between them deeply incised, these are notably lengthier than other pectoral fin rays. The pelvic fin has a single spine and 5 soft rays and has its origin to the rear of the base of the pectoral fin. This species attains a maximum standard length of 9.5 cm (3.7 in).

The Redspotted Hawkfish has an overall whitish background colour with several brownish vertical bands on the back and flanks, a dark brown caudal peduncle and numerous red spots on the head and adjacent part of the body.

== Biology ==
In Mexico

The redspotted hawkfish is a benthic fish which normally rests on the marine substrate. It uses its pectoral fins to secure itself against the current and often takes sanctuary in the lumen of tube sponges. Like other hawkfishes, the redspotted hawkfish hunts by sight, ambushing prey from its station. It mainly eats small crustaceans – such as copepods, shrimps and shrimp larvae, crabs and crab larvae – but it will also prey on polychaetes. It is a pelagic spawner, but little is known about its reproduction.

== Utilisation ==
The redspotted hawkfish is collected for the aquarium trade.
