= Teddy Tucker =

Bermudian oceanographer and naval explorer

Teddy Tucker MBE
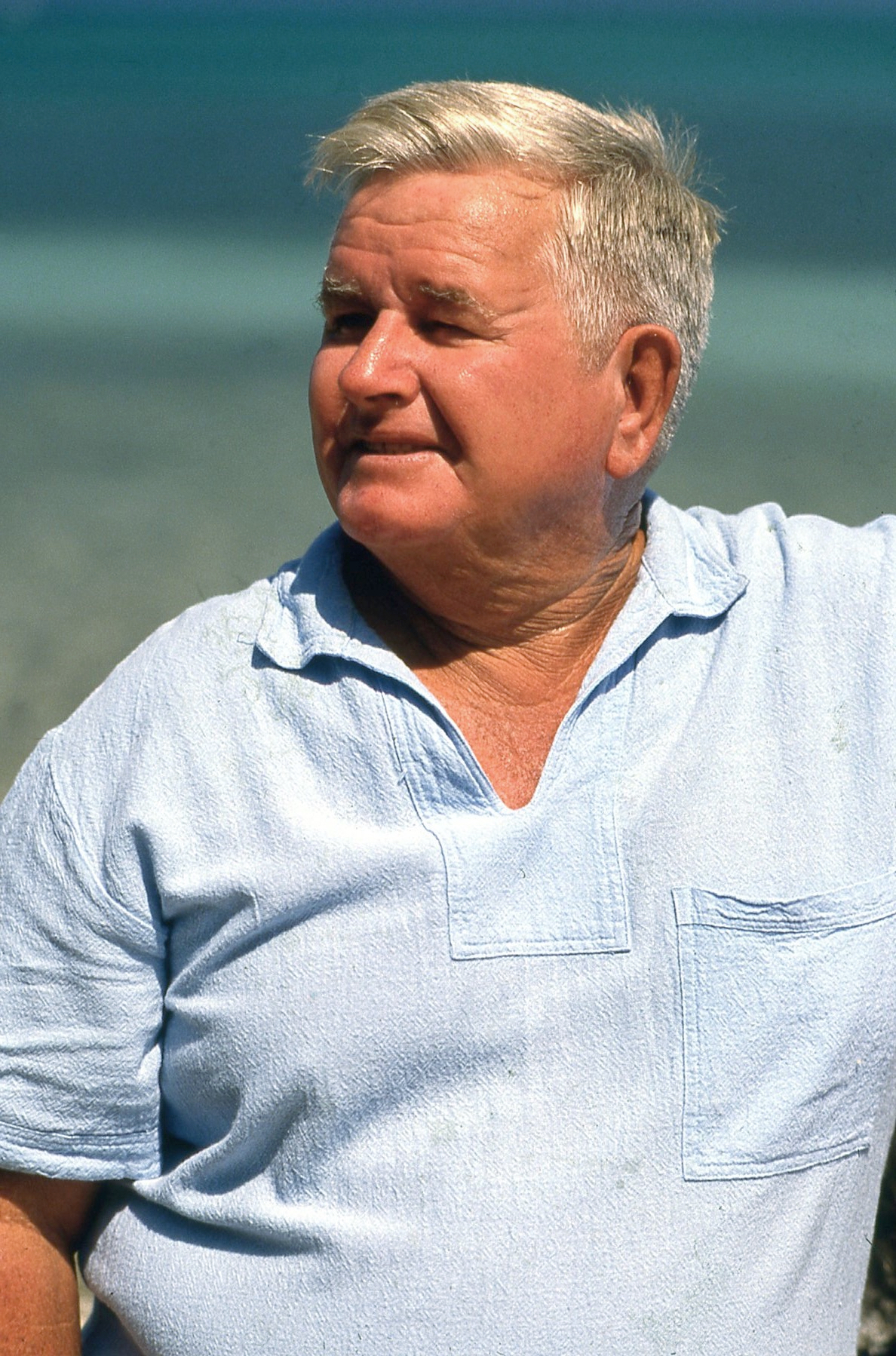
- Born: Edward Bolton Tucker; May 8, 1925; Paget, Bermuda
- Died: June 9, 2014 (aged 89)
- Spouse: Edna Gwendolyn Canton
- Children: 1
- Website: www.teddytucker.com

Edward (Teddy) Bolton Tucker (May 8, 1925 – June 9, 2014) was a shipwreck hunter and ocean explorer born in Bermuda.

== Early life ==
Teddy grew up by the shore of Hamilton Harbour, Bermuda and was a keen naturalist from an early age. He shared his mother's love of the ocean and inherited his father's fascination of ships and preferred time spent at the docks listening to the tales of the sailors, fishermen and divers over attending school. At the age of 12, Teddy took a job at one of the world's first helmet diving operations at the Bermuda Aquarium, awakening his lifelong passion for diving.

== Career ==
=== World War II ===
In 1942, at the age of 17, Teddy enlisted with the Royal Navy. His skills in diving and his knowledge of ships attracted attention and he was selected for specialist training in explosives and underwater sabotage in Arisaig, Scotland. Teddy was deployed to South-East Asia and attached to a unit of Australian special forces tasked with attacking Japanese naval vessels while in port.

At the close of the war communications had been lost with his unit operating deep behind enemy lines. Assumed to be dead by British command he was effectively abandoned in the jungle. Discovering that the war had ended from local villagers, Teddy and a member of his unit embarked on a three month trek through Burma and Vietnam to Allied lines. Demobilised, he returned to Bermuda in 1947.

=== Salvage and wreck hunting ===
Teddy bought an old work boat and started working in marine salvage and construction. He was approached by the Government of Bermuda to salvage nonferrous metals from submerged ships and shore dump sites. The copper and brass Teddy recovered was responsible for repatriating a large portion of Bermuda's war debt. This salvage work funded his true passion, to search the reef for much older, wooden shipwrecks.

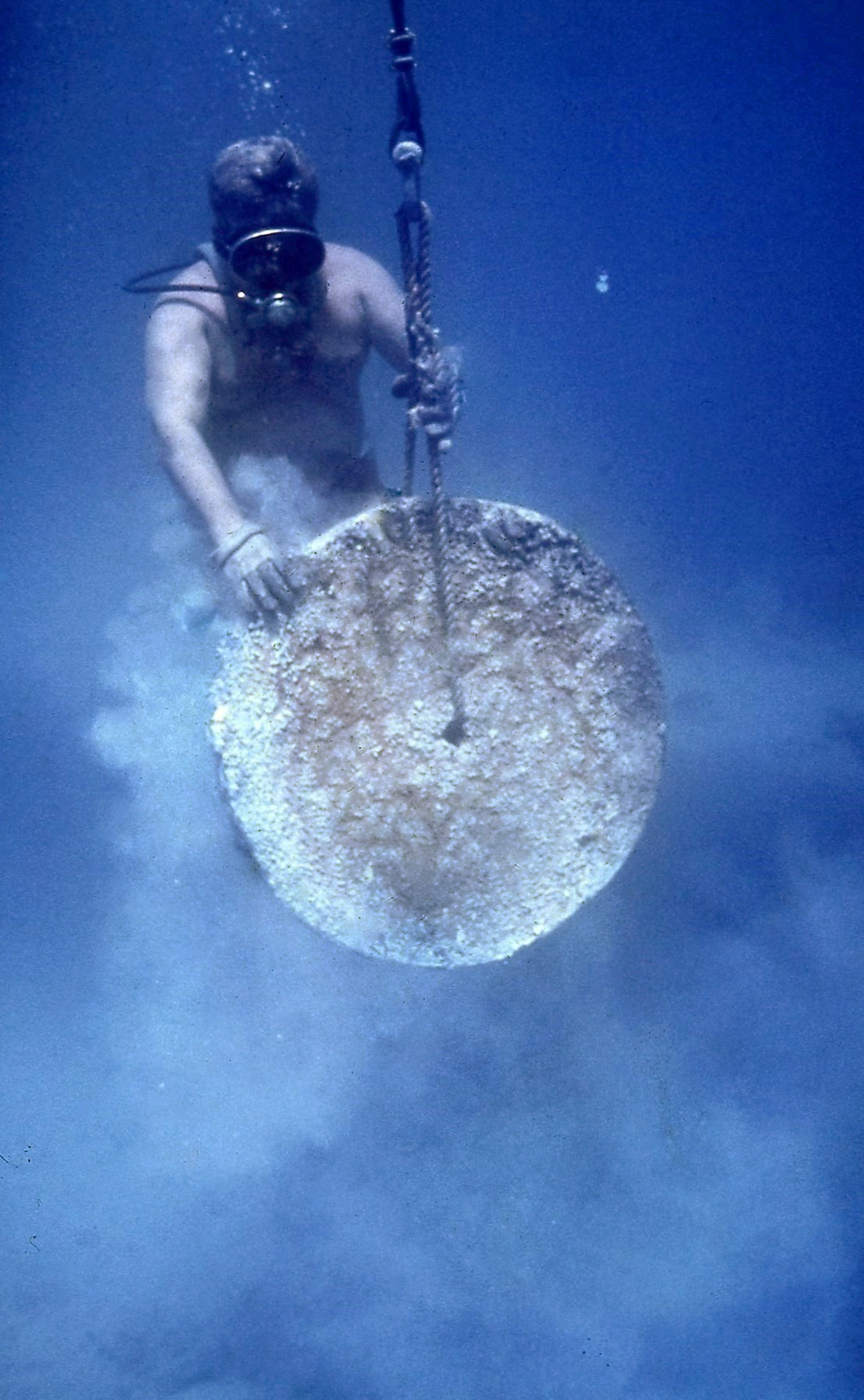
Teddy lifting a grindstone from the wreck of the Caesar

To hunt for shipwrecks Teddy adopted a low-tech method called 'towing'. Two divers would be pulled on lines 100 feet behind the boat. If they saw anything that looked like ship's ballast, a scrub mark or anything man-made, they would drop down for a closer look.

Search technologies such as the magnetometer and the side scan sonar were unreliable due to the magnetic anomalies around Bermuda and the difficulty of navigating with them through the labrynth of shallow coral heads. In a bid to cover more gound, Teddy moved the search into the air. His first attempt was with the seaplane of his friend, Colin Plant, however the speed over a site and surface disturbance of low altitude flying made identification of submerged shapes near impossible. For more control over a site, Teddy bought a weather balloon to launch from his boat with a plywood boswains chair suspended under it. Its first passenger was Teddy's wife Edna Tucker. The balloon proved to be an effective means of spotting wrecks in the shallows of the reef platform.

Teddy and his crew went out onto the platform at every opportunity searching for or excavating wrecks from dawn to dusk. Over his career, Teddy found over 125 shipwrecks representing four centuries of ocean travel.

=== Marine Archaeology ===
In 1955, Teddy invited Mendel Peterson, Chairman of the Department of Armed Forces History at the Smithsonian Institution to examine the wreck of the San Antonio. This marked the beginning of an eleven-year partnership and lifelong friendship, which contributed significantly to the development of modern marine archaeology.

They devised methods for estimating the structure and dimensions of a wreck, for obtaining and recording accurate position fixes underwater and for envisaging the wreck's historic context. Taken together this amounted to an enormous step forward in marine archaeology. The methodologies Teddy and Mendel pioneered form the basis of modern marine archaeology practices to this day.

== Tucker Cross ==
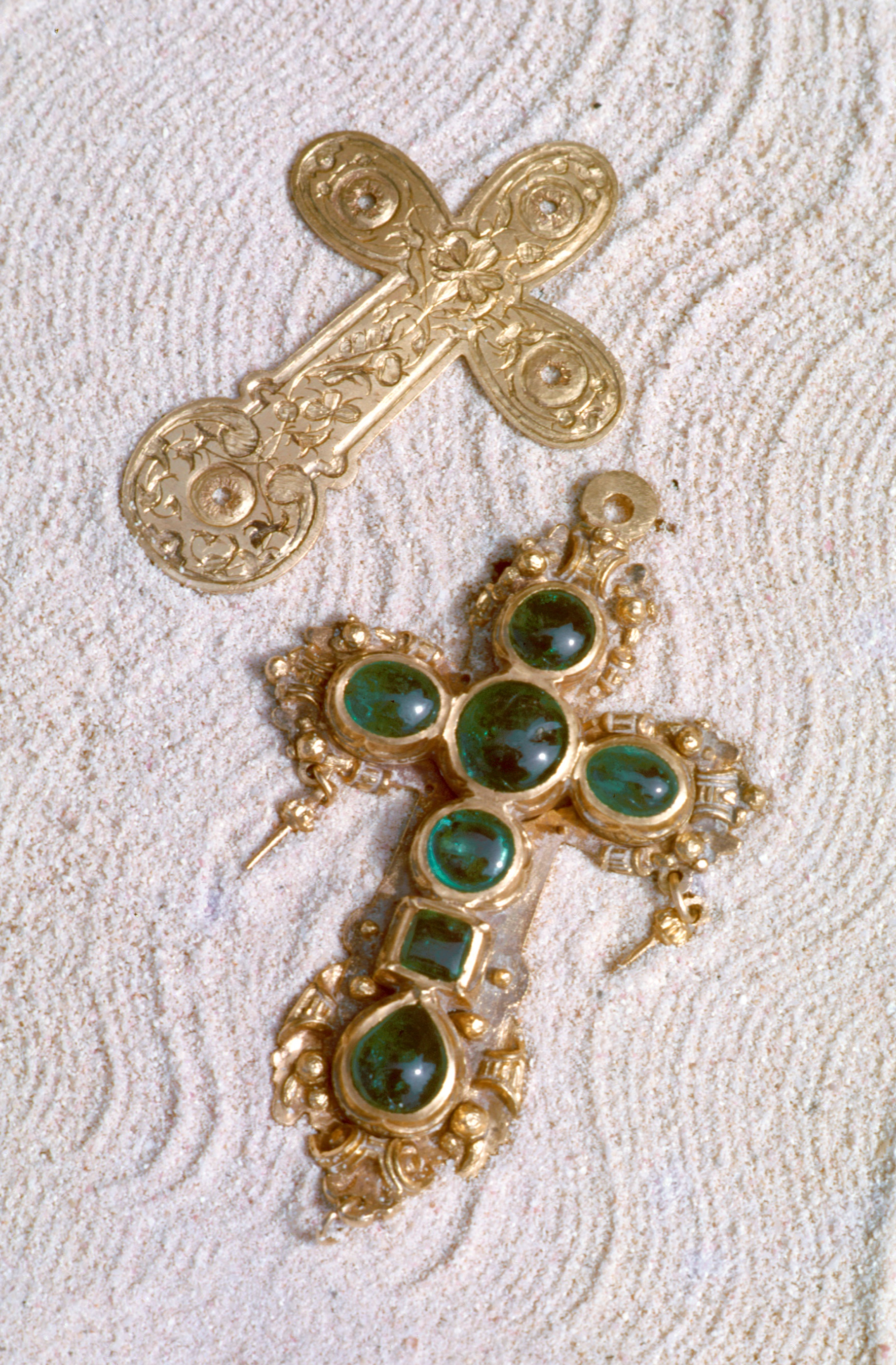
The Tucker Cross. Photograph by Peter Stackpole

In 1950 while cruising the outer reefs Teddy saw six cannons laying in the sand between two reefs. Five years later he returned for a proper look. The wreck he had found was determined to be the Spanish ship, San Pedro, 1595.

Over several visits Teddy found ships timbers, porcelain, coins, a small five-sided gold cube, gold ingots and pearl buttons. During an enforced break due to a period of bad weather Teddy dreamt of the wreck, a dream so vivid that he woke his wife, Edna to tell her about it. His dream centred around a particular large coral head at the site, below which he found gold. When the weather improved he returned to the wreck and to that coral head. Within minutes he found a bar of gold weighing 1 kg. Teddy then exposed a piece of ship's planking under which he found an ornate gold cross studded with emeralds.

The San Pedro treasure was the first to be found on Bermuda's reef. The most significant item in the collection was the Gold and Emerald cross which became known as the Tucker Cross. With an intricate design it consisted of four pieces, which could be dismantled. The back could be removed to reveal a shallow recess to hold a sacred relic. The seven emeralds were determined to be among the purest ever analysed. The Tucker Cross and associated treasure was described as the most significant found in the western hemisphere.

The Bermudian government claimed ownership of the treasure as Bermuda's territorial seabed was part of the British Crown Estate. In response Teddy told them that if that was the case he would take it all back to the reef and they could look for it themselves. Teddy retained ownership of the treasure. The Tucker Cross alone was valued at over $250,000 at the time and despite being approached with offers to purchase the cross Teddy agreed to sell the full treasure haul to the Bermuda Government for £35,000.

=== Theft of the Cross ===
In 1975, the treasure from the San Pedro was transported from the Bermuda Auquarium to the Bermuda Maritime Museum, to be shown to Elizabeth II.

Moments before the Queen arrived, Teddy inspected the display and noticed that the Tucker Cross had been replaced by a replica. Concerned that the Queen would recognise a fake he removed the replica, its gold veneer still tacky to the touch, before presenting the remaining treasure.

Nobody involved claimed to know that a replica had been used and the point at which the swap was made is unknown. The subsequent police investigation failed to uncover any reliable leads and to date the Tucker Cross has never been found.

== Movie Inspiration ==
=== Jaws ===
Author Peter Benchley became close friends with Teddy after visiting Bermuda on assignment for the National Geographic magazine in 1970. Benchley's classic novel Jaws was partially written on Teddy's boat, the Brigadier while on fishing trips with their friend, Adrian Hooper. The trio of friends formed the inspiration for the three main characters in the book and subsequent film: Adrian Hooper, played by Richard Dreyfuss (Matt Hooper), Teddy played by Robert Shaw (Quint) and Peter by Roy Schneider (Martin Brody).

=== The Deep ===
Benchley's second novel The Deep, a thriller about the hunt for sunken treasure and ampules of drugs, is based on Teddy's discoveries on the wreck of the Constellation. In the 1977 movie, Teddy's character Romer Treece is again played by Robert Shaw while Teddy has a cameo as the harbour master.

== Ocean research ==
The steep drop off of the Bermuda Sea Mount makes the island a perfect location to conduct deep and open ocean research. Teddy's notable projects include:

- 6 Gill Shark: Discovered a species of 6 gill shark in Bermuda's waters.
- The Beebe Project: A founding member of the 1984 Beebe Project; collaborative deep ocean exploration between western and soviet oceanographic institutions.
- Whale Migration Study: 1987 study of the migratory, feeding and resting habits of the Atlantic Humpback Whale with Dr Greg Stone and Dr Steve Katona.
- Bermuda Sea Level Rise Project: 1997 study with Steve Blasco, Geological Survey of Canada, investigating a submerged cedar forest to determine rates of sea level rise around the Bermuda Sea Mount.
- Founding trustee of the Bermuda Underwater Exploration Institute (BUEI), opened in 1997 to showcase ocean exploration and the marine sciences.

== Conservation ==
- West Indian Topshell: Reintroduction of the mollusc along Bermuda's shore with Topshells collected from Turks and Caicos.
- Mangrove restoration: Built sea walls and planting areas to establish new mangrove forests.
- Sargasso Sea Alliance: Founding member of a partnership between the Bermuda Government and conservation groups to create the first high seas Marine Protected Area.

== Awards and honours ==
1985, Charter Member of the Hellenic Institute of Marine Archaeology.

1991, Presented the Distinguished Service Award by the Underwater Society of America

1994, Received the Member of the Order of the British Empire honour from HRH Queen Elizabeth II, for services to deep sea research.

2000, recipient of The Explorers Club, Lowell Thomas Award for “Challenging the Deep”
