= Nonsuch Island, Bermuda =

Island of Bermuda

Coordinates: 32°20′51″N 64°39′47″W

Location of Nonsuch Island to the south of St David's Island

Nonsuch Island (originally Nonesuch Island) is part of the chain of islands which make up Bermuda. It is in St George's Parish, in the northeast of Bermuda. It is 5.7 ha (14 acres) in area and is at the east entrance to Castle Harbour, close to the south-easternmost point of Cooper's Island (cojoined with the much larger St David's Island by the construction of Kindley Field by the United States Army during the Second World War). Among the island's charted features is a bay called Nonsuch Bay.

== History ==
In 1865 it served as a yellow fever quarantine hospital. On the eastern part of the island there still remains a small cemetery. In 1930 it served as a base for William Beebe and Otis Barton's landmark bathysphere dive.

== Environment ==
The island is a wildlife sanctuary. It is wooded and with a small freshwater marsh; access to the public is strictly limited. The restoration of the once barren island into a 'Living Museum of pre-colonial Bermuda' is the lifetime work of now retired Bermudian ornithologist and conservationist David B. Wingate, and part of his effort to bring back from near-extinction the once plentiful endemic nocturnal seabird, and national emblem of Bermuda, the cahow. This project involves the reintroduction of other species, notably the West Indian topshell.

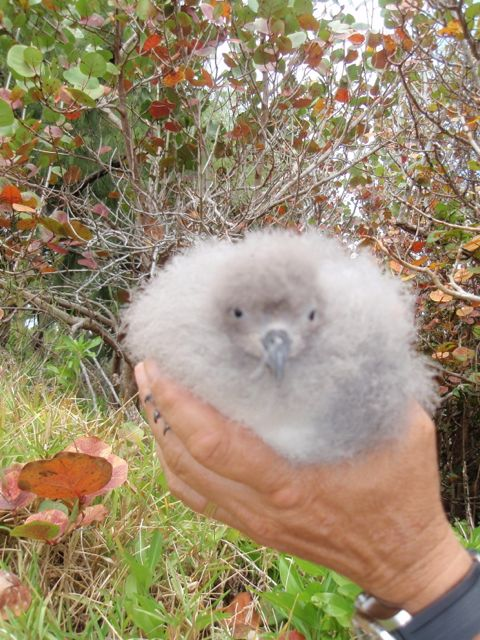
Chick of a Bermuda petrel on Nonsuch Island, 2009

Accounts written at the time of Bermuda's settlement leave no doubt that herons and egrets of several species were resident and breeding on the island. Diego Ramirez (in Wilkinson 1950) describing the events of his shipwreck on Bermuda in 1603, wrote of "the many very large dark herons" and Sylvanus Jourdain, (in Lefroy 1877), a survivor of the Sea Venture shipwreck of 1609 that led to British settlement, reported in 1610 that "there are also great store and plenty of herons and those so familiar and tame that we beat them down from the trees with stones and staves, but such were young herons. Besides many white herons without so much as a black or grey feather on them." Likewise, William Strachey (in Lefroy 1877), another survivor of the Sea Venture and the official chronicler of the Virginia expedition, wrote of the "white and grey Hernshawes and bittons."

The endemic, and critically endangered Bermuda skink (Plestiodon longirostris), otherwise known as the Bermudian rock lizard, is also known to have a population on Nonsuch Island.
