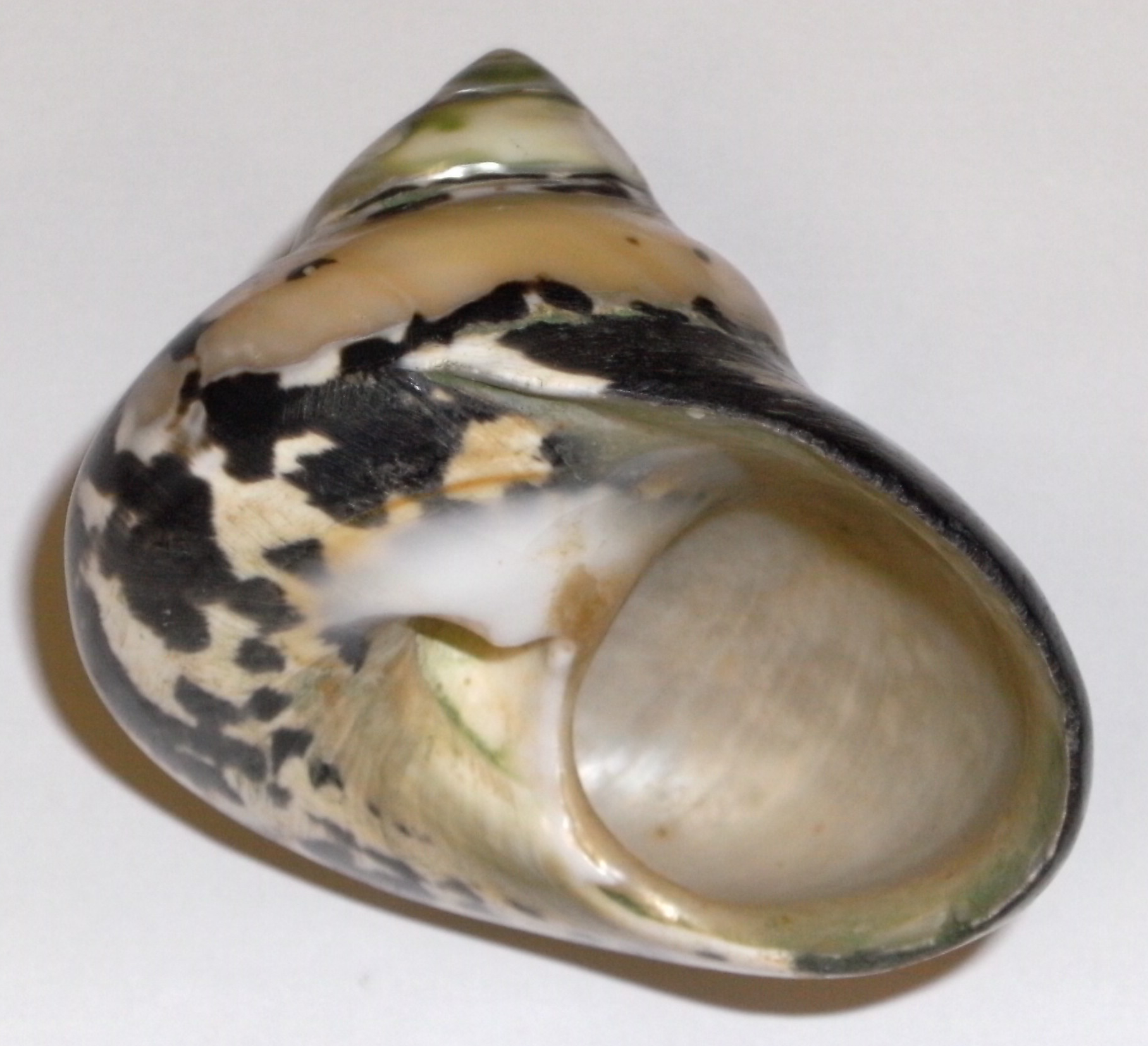
- Shell of Cittarium pica

Scientific classification
- Kingdom: Animalia
- Phylum: Mollusca
- Class: Gastropoda
- Subclass: Vetigastropoda
- Order: Trochida
- Superfamily: Trochoidea
- Family: Tegulidae
- Genus: Cittarium; Philippi, 1847

Type species
- Turbo pica Linnaeus, 1758

Synonyms
- Livona Gray, 1842; Meleagris Montfort, 1810 (invalid: not Meleagris Linnaeus, 1758 [Aves]; Cittarium is a replacement name); Trochus (Livona) Gray, 1842

= Cittarium =

Genus of gastropods

Cittarium is a genus of a sea snails, a marine gastropod mollusk in the family Tegulidae.

== Species ==
There are two species in the genus Cittarium:

- † Cittarium maestratii Lozouet, 2002
- Cittarium pica (Linnaeus, 1758)
