= Tucker's Cross =

Gold cross artifact

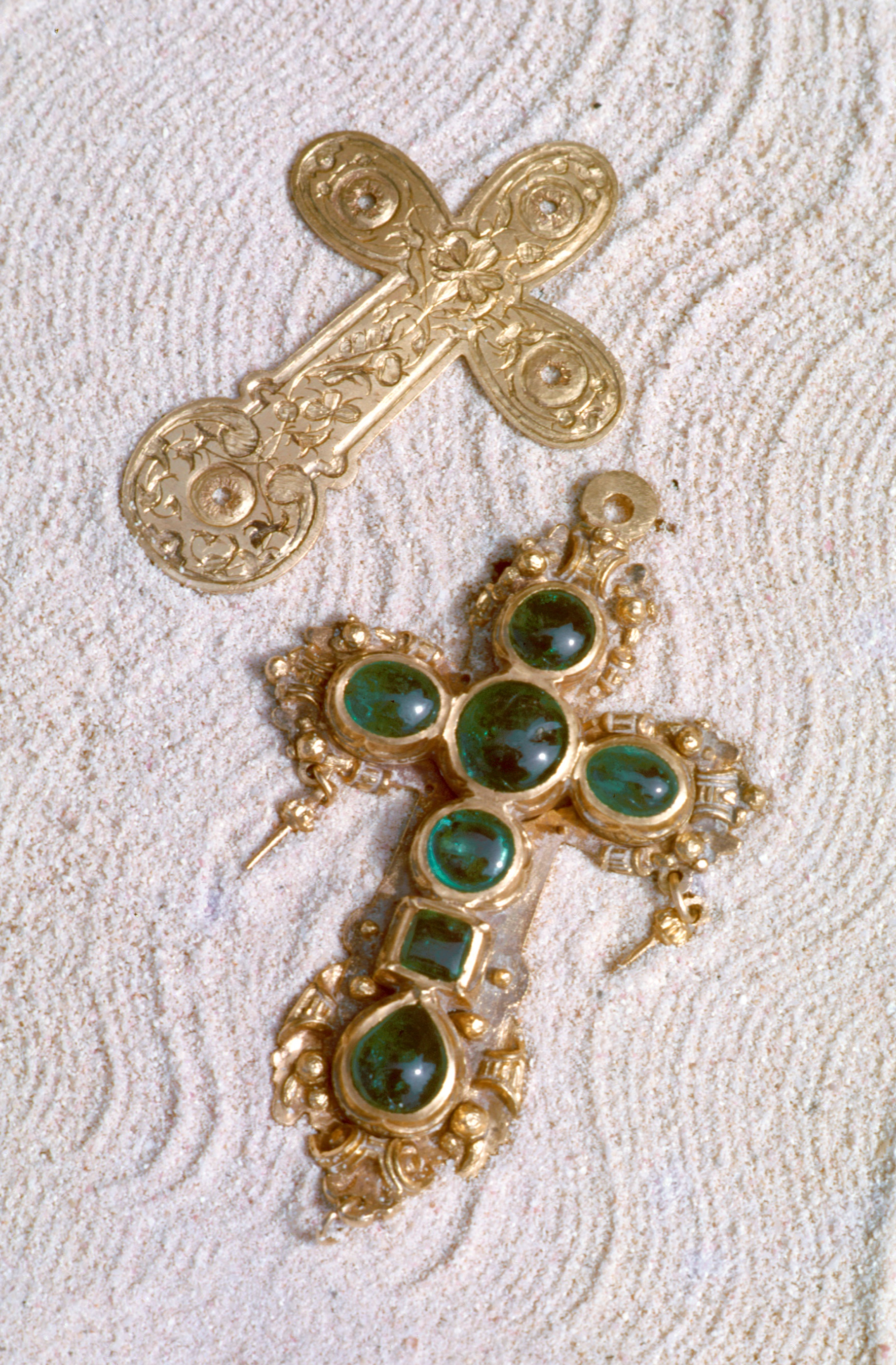
The Tucker Cross. Photograph by Peter Stackpole

Tucker's Cross is an emerald-studded (7 emeralds total) 22-karat gold cross discovered by Bermudian marine explorer Teddy Tucker in 1955. Its origin is believed to be the San Pedro, a Spanish galleon that wrecked in 1594.

On discovery, Tucker believed the cross to be Indian-made due to its simplicity. By 1997, it was considered to be the most valuable single object ever found in a shipwreck.

Tucker sold it to the Government of Bermuda in 1959 so that it would remain on the island, and for some time it was kept in the Aquarian Museum, which Tucker and his wife ran on behalf of the Government. Subsequent to his sale of the museum for $100,000, and prior to Queen Elizabeth II's planned visit to the museum, it was discovered that the Cross had been stolen and a cheap plastic replica left in its place.
