= Flatts Village, Bermuda =

Flatts
- Village
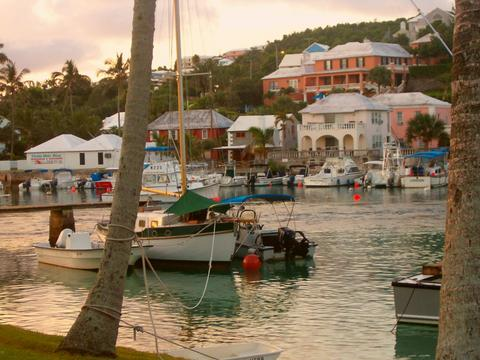
- Flatts, Hamilton Parish, Bermuda

- Location within Bermuda
- Coordinates: 32°19′12″N 64°44′15″W
- Country: Bermuda
- Parish: Hamilton

Population
  - Total: 412
- Time zone: GMT
- Climate: Cfa

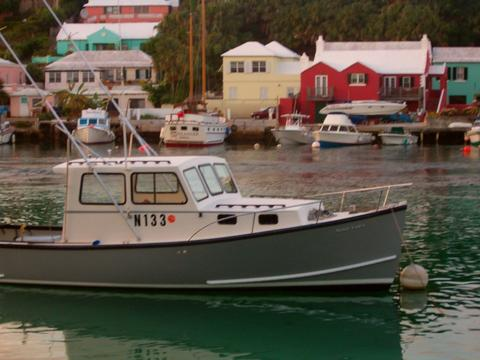
Flatts Village, Hamilton Parish, Bermuda.

Flatts is a small settlement in Bermuda, lying on the southern bank of Flatt's Inlet in Hamilton Parish, almost exactly between the territory's two incorporated municipalities, Hamilton and St. George's.

== History ==
It is one of the earliest settled areas in Bermuda. Although the entrance to the inlet is now too shallow, due to sand, to allow entrance to large vessels, it was once a useful harbour. Its primary utility is often said to have been that it was remote from the old Capital, St. George's, and the customs officers located there. The Island's parliament occasionally met in Flatts, historically, although the official seat of government remained the State House, in St. George's until moving to Hamilton in 1815. A number of former warehouses and prominent homes survive in Flatts Village to speak of its more prosperous and active past.

Flatts Bridge crosses the inlet at the settlement, and the Bermuda Aquarium, Museum and Zoo is located opposite, on the north side of the inlet. The former Station of the defunct Bermuda Railway is now home to the Bermuda National History Museum. The Aquarium, Museum and Zoo are open 364 days a year (Closed Christmas Day) from 9 to 5 (Last admission is at 4 pm) Admission is inclusive for all 3 venues.
