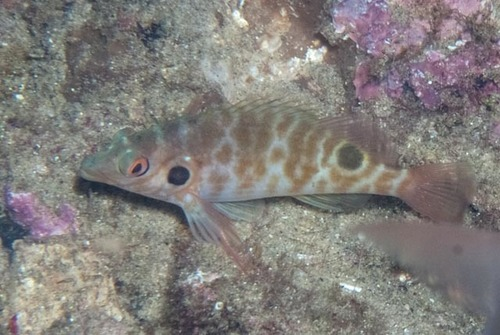
- In Mozambique

Conservation status
- Least Concern (IUCN 3.1)

Scientific classification
- Kingdom: Animalia
- Phylum: Chordata
- Class: Actinopterygii
- Division: Teleostei
- Order: Centrarchiformes
- Family: Cirrhitidae
- Genus: Amblycirrhitus
- Species: A. bimacula

Binomial name
- Amblycirrhitus bimacula (Jenkins, 1903)

Synonyms
- Cirrhitoidea bimacula Jenkins, 1903; Paracirrhites bimaculatus (Jenkins, 1903)

= Twospot hawkfish =

Species of fish

The twospot hawkfish (Amblycirrhitus bimacula), or twinspot hawkfish, is a species of marine ray-finned fish, a hawkfish belonging to the family Cirrhitidae. it is found in the Indo-Pacific. It can be found in the aquarium trade.

== Taxonomy ==
The twospot hawkfish was first formally described in 1903 as Cirrhitoidea bimacula by the American zoologist Oliver Peebles Jenkins with the type locality given as Honolulu.

The specific name bimacula means "two spot" a reference to the two spots, one on the operculum and the other on the upper body towards the caudal fin.

== Distribution and habitat ==
Closeup, in Mozambique

The twospot hawkfish has a wide Indo-Pacific distribution. It is found along the coast of Eastern Africa between Kenya and South Africa the east across the Indian Ocean into the Pacific Ocean as Far East as Hawaii and the Pitcairn Islands, north to the Ryukyu and Ogasawara Islands and south to Australia.

In Australian territorial waters it is found at Christmas Island and the Coco (Keeling) Islands in the eastern Indian Ocean, from Ningaloo Reef to Rosily Island in Western Australia and along the Great Barrier Reef south to Moreton Bay in Queensland. It is also found at Boot Reef and Osprey Reef in the Coral Sea.

They are found from 0 to 20 m (0 to 66 ft) on coral reefs.

== Description ==
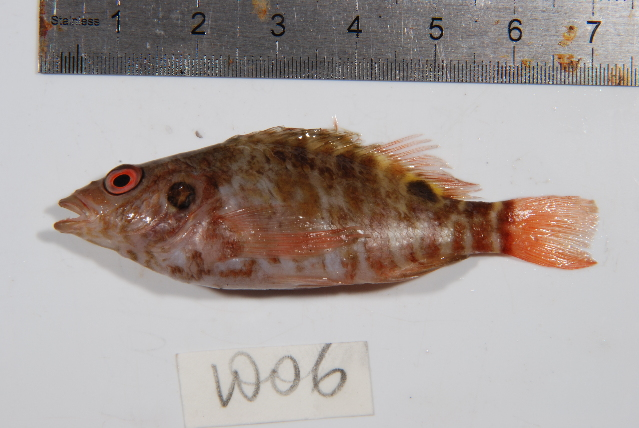
A. bimacula

The twospot hawkfish has a body which has a depth which is approximately one third of its standard length. The dorsal fin has 10 spines and 12 soft rays while the anal fin has 3spines and 6 soft rays. This species grows to a maximum length of 9 cm (3.5 in).

This species has undulating reddish-brown bars on the flanks. There is a large pale margined black spot on the opercle, and a similar spot at the rear over the base of the dorsal fin.

== Biology ==
The twospot hawkfish is a secretive, benthic species which is typically found hiding in crevices in reefs or between rocks or rubble. It can be common where there is exposure to surge or currents on seaward reefs. It feeds on small crustaceans.

== Utilisation ==
The twospot hawkfish is collected for the aquarium trade.
