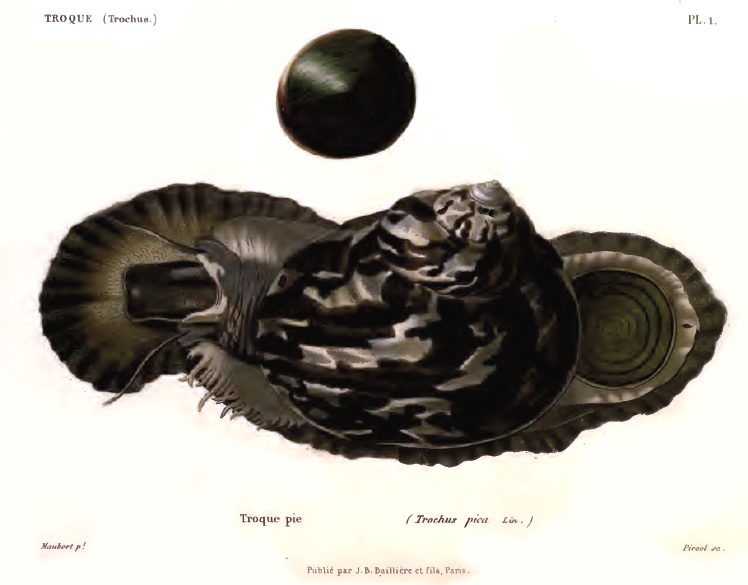
- A colored illustration of a live Cittarium pica, showing the inner surface of the operculum at the top
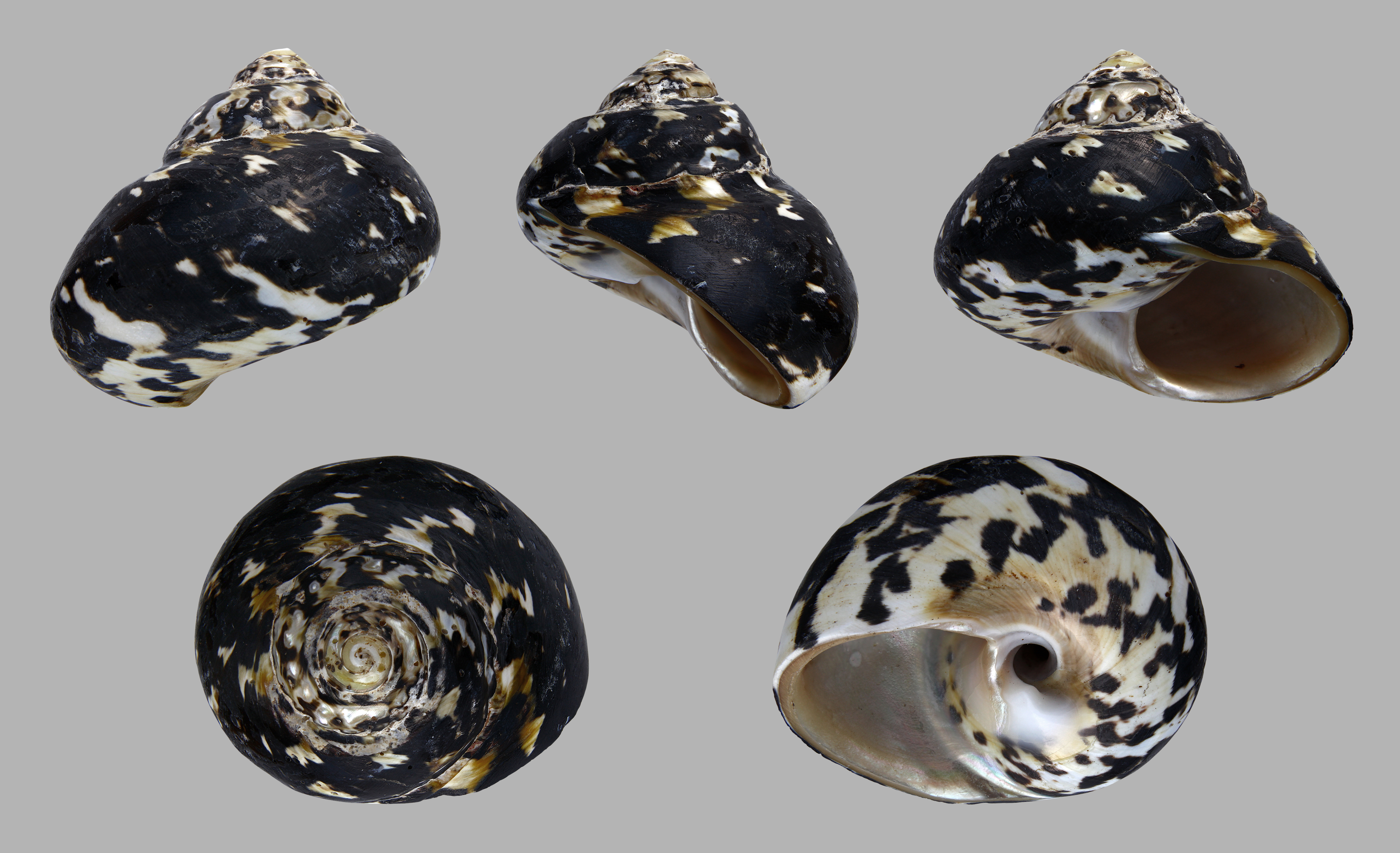
- Five views of a shell of Cittarium pica

Scientific classification
- Kingdom: Animalia
- Phylum: Mollusca
- Class: Gastropoda
- Subclass: Vetigastropoda
- Order: Trochida
- Superfamily: Trochoidea
- Family: Tegulidae
- Genus: Cittarium
- Species: C. pica

Binomial name
- Cittarium pica (Linnaeus, 1758)

Synonyms
- Cittarium picoides Gould, A.A., 1853; Livona pica (Linnaeus, 1758); Livona picoides (Gould, 1853); Meleagris pica (Linnaeus, 1758); Trochus picoides Gould, 1853; Turbo pica Linnaeus, 1758

= Cittarium pica =

Cittarium pica Temporal range: Pleistocene–Recent

Species of gastropod

Cittarium pica, common name the West Indian top shell or magpie shell, is a species of large edible sea snail, a marine gastropod mollusk in the family Tegulidae. This species has a large black and white shell.

This snail is known as "wilk" or "wilks" (or sometimes as "whelks") in the English-speaking Caribbean islands of the West Indies, where this is a popular food item. The word "wilk" or "wilks" can be used both as a singular form and a plural. This species is however not at all closely related to the species that are known as whelks in the U.S. and in Europe. In some Spanish-speaking parts of the Caribbean, when used as a food source Cittarium pica is known as bulgao, or simply as caracoles (snails, in Spanish). In Venezuela it is called quigua; in Cuba it is called cigua.

Cittarium pica is considered the third most economically important invertebrate species in the Caribbean, after the spiny lobster (Panulirus argus) and the queen conch (Eustrombus gigas). It has gone locally extinct in some habitats due to overfishing and overexploitation.

== Taxonomy ==
Cittarium pica is within the clade Vetigastropoda. The vetigastropods are considered to be among the most primitive living neo-gastropods, and are widely distributed in all oceans of the world. It is also part of the superfamily Trochoidea, presenting nacre as the inner shell layer, and its subordinated family Tegulidae. Woodring et al. (1924) recombined this species as Cittarium picum. Weisbord (1962) recombined it as Livona pica, and it was finally recombined as Cittarium pica by Philippi (1847), Rosenberg (2005) and Hendy et al. (2008).

This is the only living species in the genus Cittarium. For a long time, only one species in the genus Cittarium was known, however in 2002 a fossil species Cittarium maestratii Lozouet, 2002 was discovered in the Oligocene deposits of southwestern France and named.

== Shell description ==
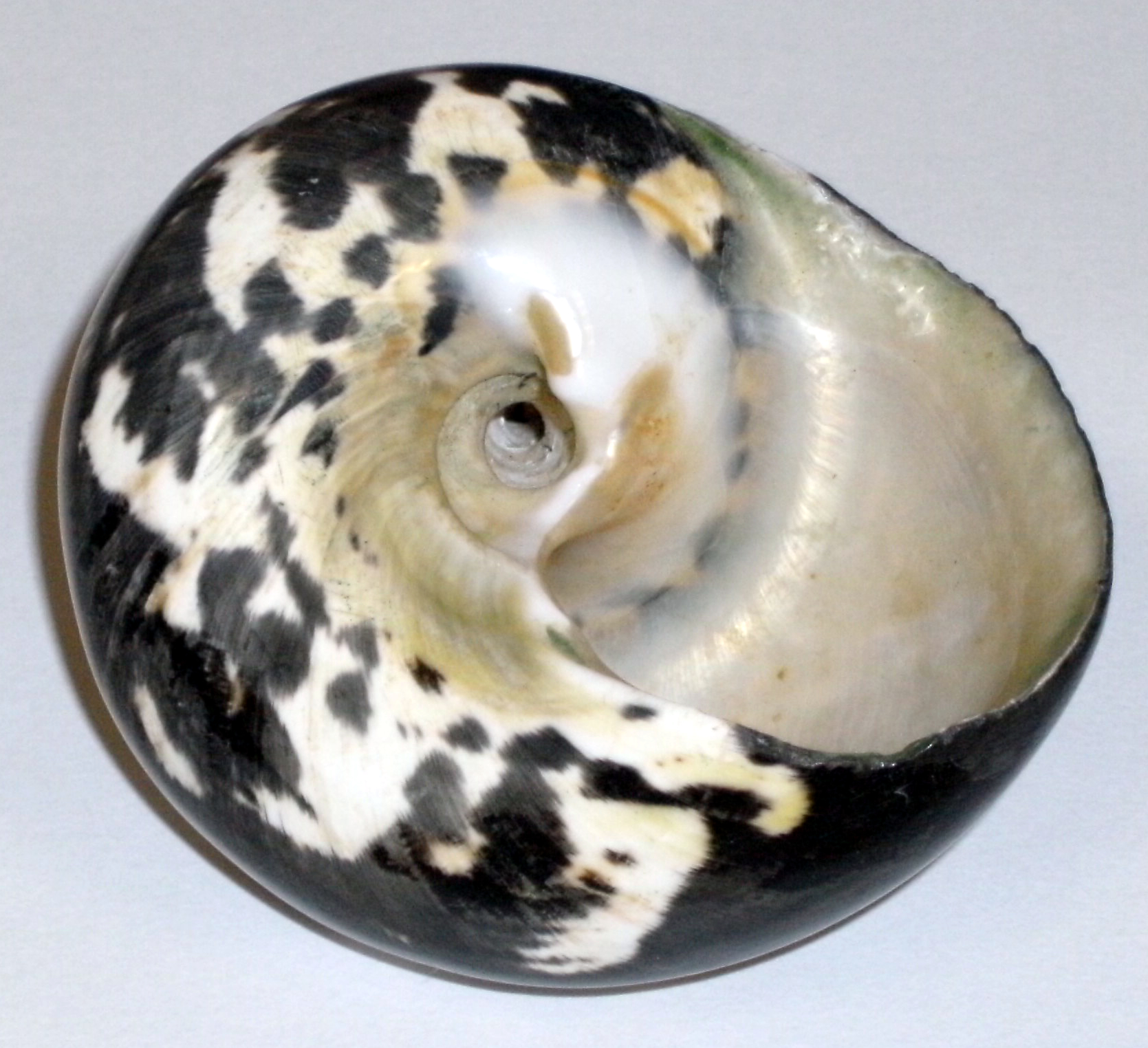
The wide and deep umbilicus of Cittarium pica is very distinctive. This shell has been polished.

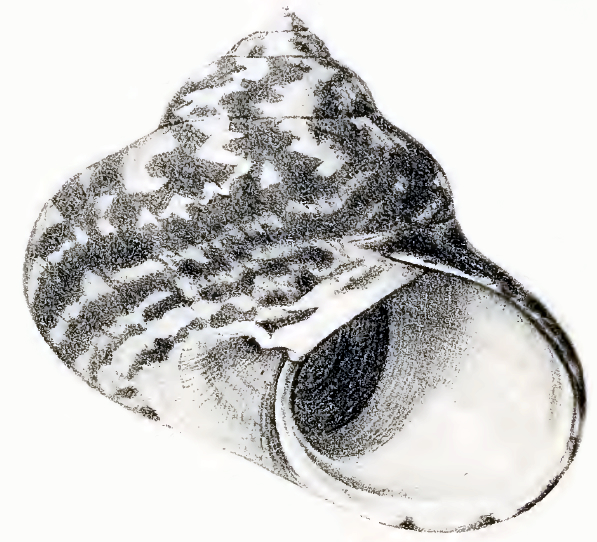
Drawing of a shell of Cittarium pica

The shell of this species can be up to 137 mm in maximum dimension. It is very thick and heavy, having an outline that is between trochiform and turbiniform in shape, with rounded shoulders and a somewhat low conical form.

The spire is conoidal. It contains about six convex whorls. The large body whorl is depressed-globose. The outer lip is simple. The lip is edged inside by black, or black and white. The columella is arcuate, produced above in a heavy porcellanous callous deposit, half-surrounding the umbilicus and deeply notched in the middle.

The shell of Cittarium pica presents a rather wide umbilicus, which is deep and devoid of sculpture, but spirally bicostate inside. The semicircular, oblique aperture is distinguishably nacreous inside as is the case in other Trochoidea, and is circular. The parietal callus is glossy and delicate, and has a node that projects towards the umbilicus. Juvenile individuals possess shells ornamented by spiral lines and strong cords, in contrast to the nearly smooth, homogeneous surface of mature specimens.

The lusterless color pattern is rather distinct, overall white with black zigzag flammules on each whorl. Those spots have a tendency to become axial lines in older, larger individuals. The upper surface is often entirely black. The aperture is commonly white, with an inner iridescence because of the nacre.

Young shells, or well-preserved adults, have the spire whorls sculptured by oblique folds, cut by a few spiral sulci. The periphery and the base in the half-grown shells are spirally lirate.

Unusual erosion

On some old, empty shells of large individuals, the black colored parts become slightly higher in relief, compared to the white areas surrounding it. This unusual morphology may be due to the action of blue-green algae, such as Plectonema terebrans, which continuously erode the surface of the white parts of the shell.

== Distribution ==
This species occurs rarely in the Florida Keys, and in the Caribbean coast of Mexico, Costa Rica, Panama, Colombia and Venezuela. It also occurs in the Bahamas, Cuba, the Cayman Islands, Jamaica, Haiti, the Dominican Republic, Puerto Rico, and the Lesser Antilles as far south as Barbados and Trinidad and Tobago. The species has been reintroduced to Bermuda.

== Ecology ==
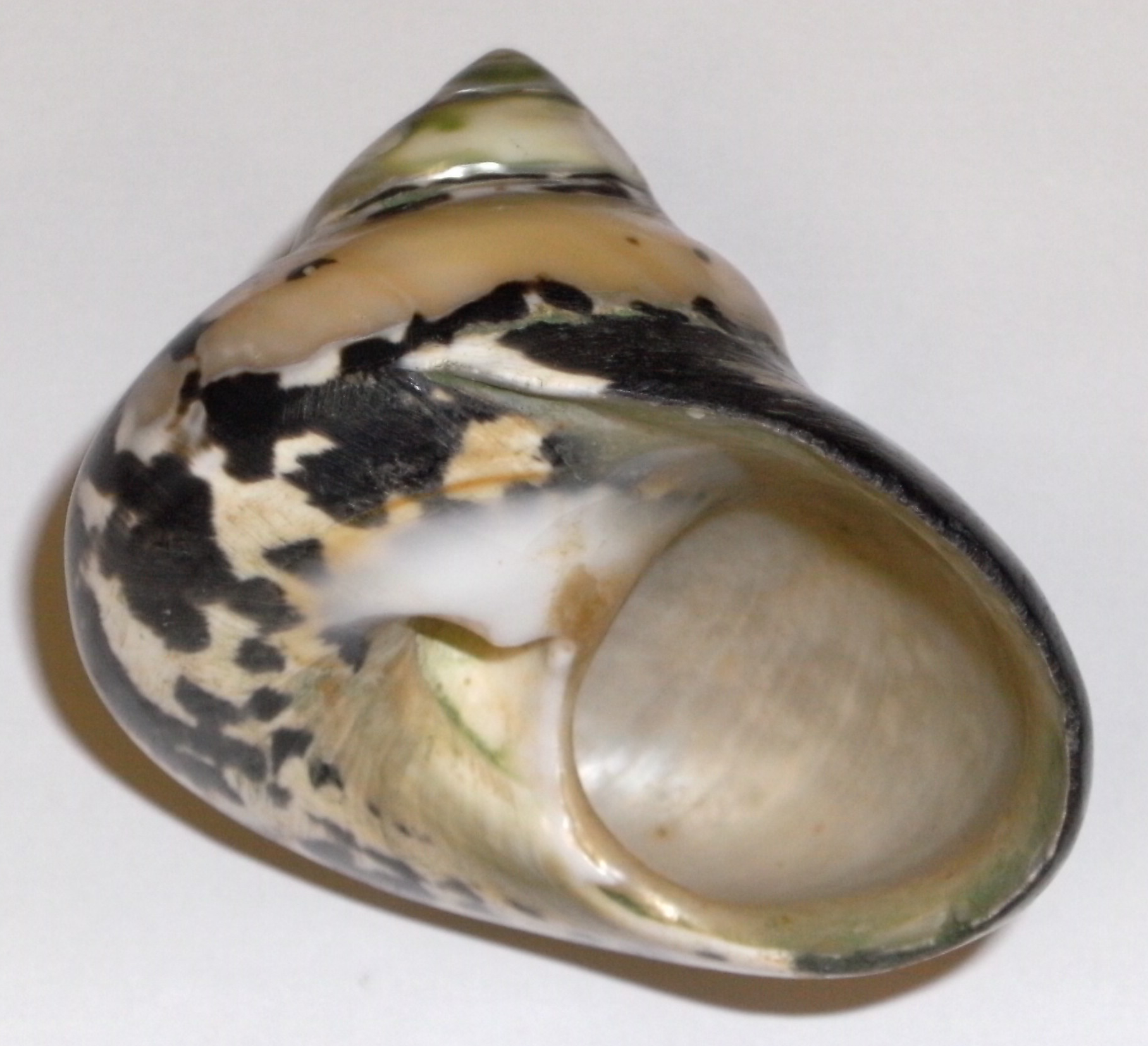
An empty shell of Cittarium pica which has been polished to make it look more attractive

=== Habitat ===
This large snail is found on or under rocks, in exposed and moderately sheltered shores, both in intertidal and shallow subtidal zones. Cittarium pica generally does not live at great depths, though this has occasionally been reported. Most individuals are found at the water's edge, and have little tendency to disperse. Minimum recorded depth is 0 m. Maximum recorded depth is 7 m.

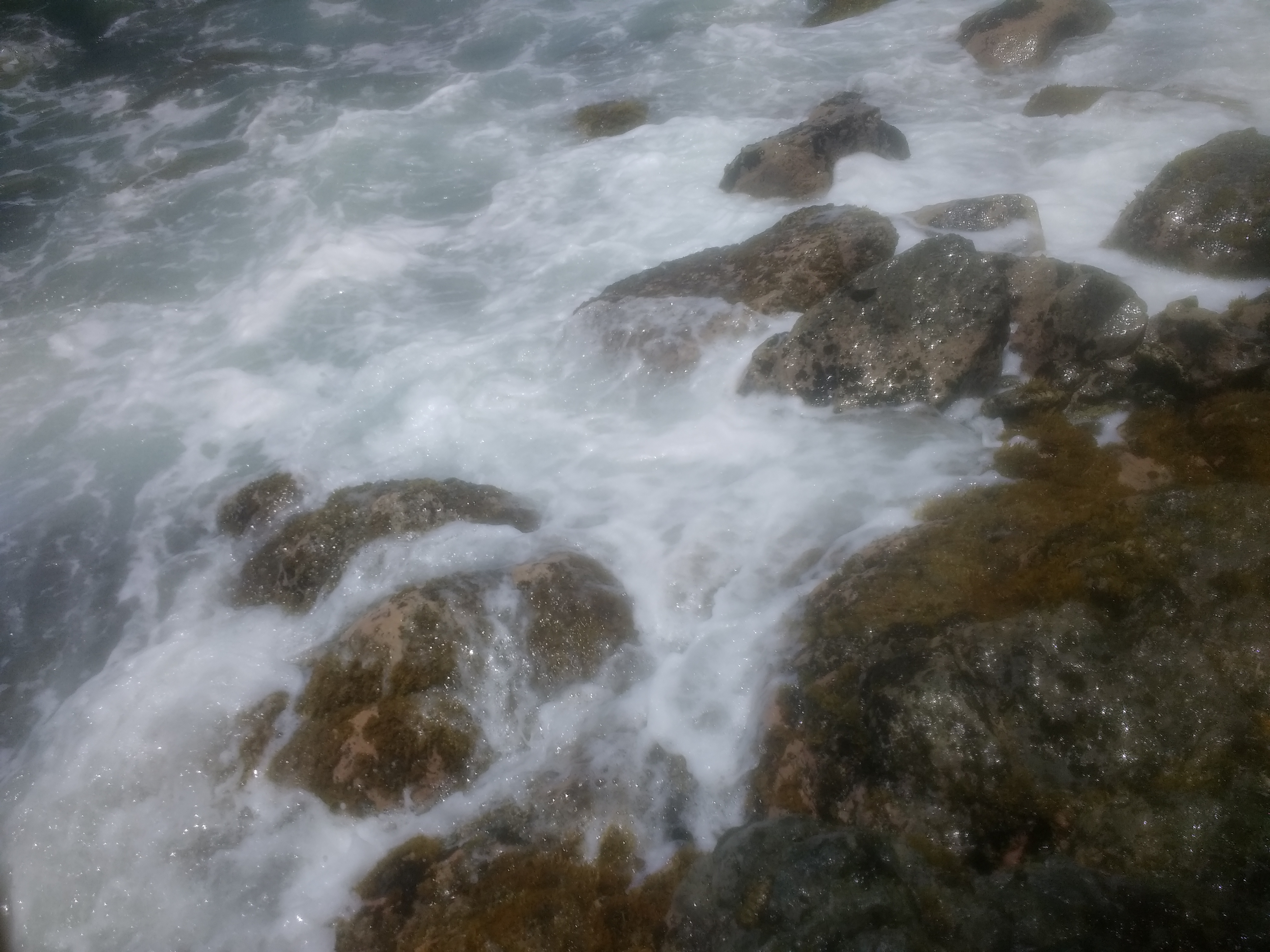
Rocky shore on St. Croix US Virgin Islands, habitat of Cittarium pica

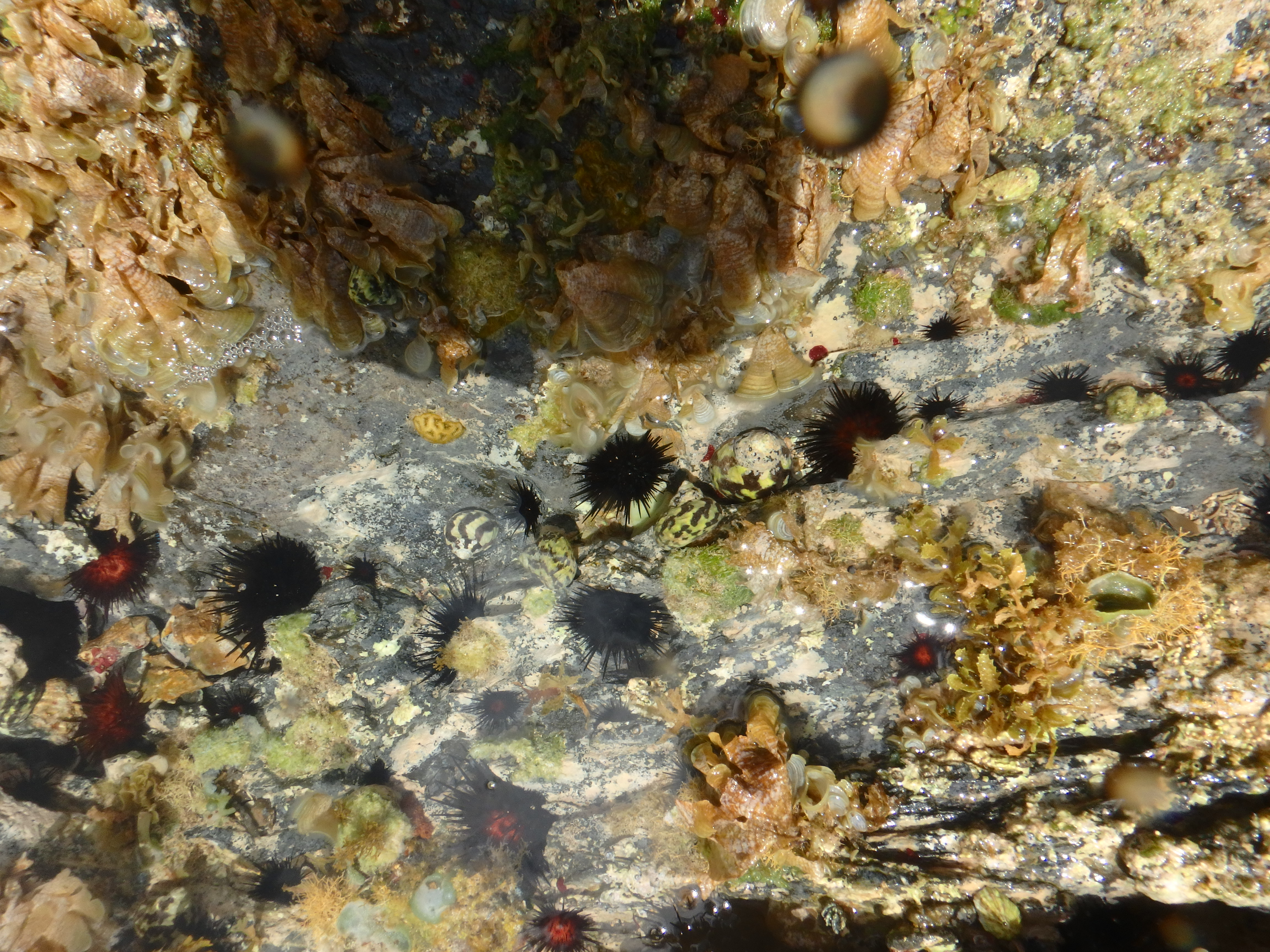
A small shallow seawater pool found on St. Croix's north shore

=== Life cycle ===
Cittarium pica is dioecious, which means each individual organism belonging to this species is distinctly male or female. The fertilisation in this species occurs externally. During the reproductive season, which normally occurs from June to November in the field, male individuals release their sperm into the water, as females simultaneously release their green colored unfertilised eggs. The encounter of those gametes produce yolky fertilised eggs, which will further develop into lecithotrophic (yolk feeding) larvae. They emerge from the egg capsules as shell-cap-bearing trochophores. These trochophore larvae do not spend much time in the plankton, because settlement occurs relatively soon, after 3.5 to 4.5 days. Individuals usually reach sexual maturity at shell lengths of 32–34 mm. The life span of this species is still unknown, but estimates for other top shells reach 30 years.

=== Feeding habits ===
The west Indian top shell is known to be an herbivore, feeding on a large variety of algae, and sometimes also on detritus. They actively scrape the algal growths off rocks, and this tends to cause erosion over time. Feeding commonly occurs during the nocturnal period, when the snails are most active.

=== Biological interactions ===
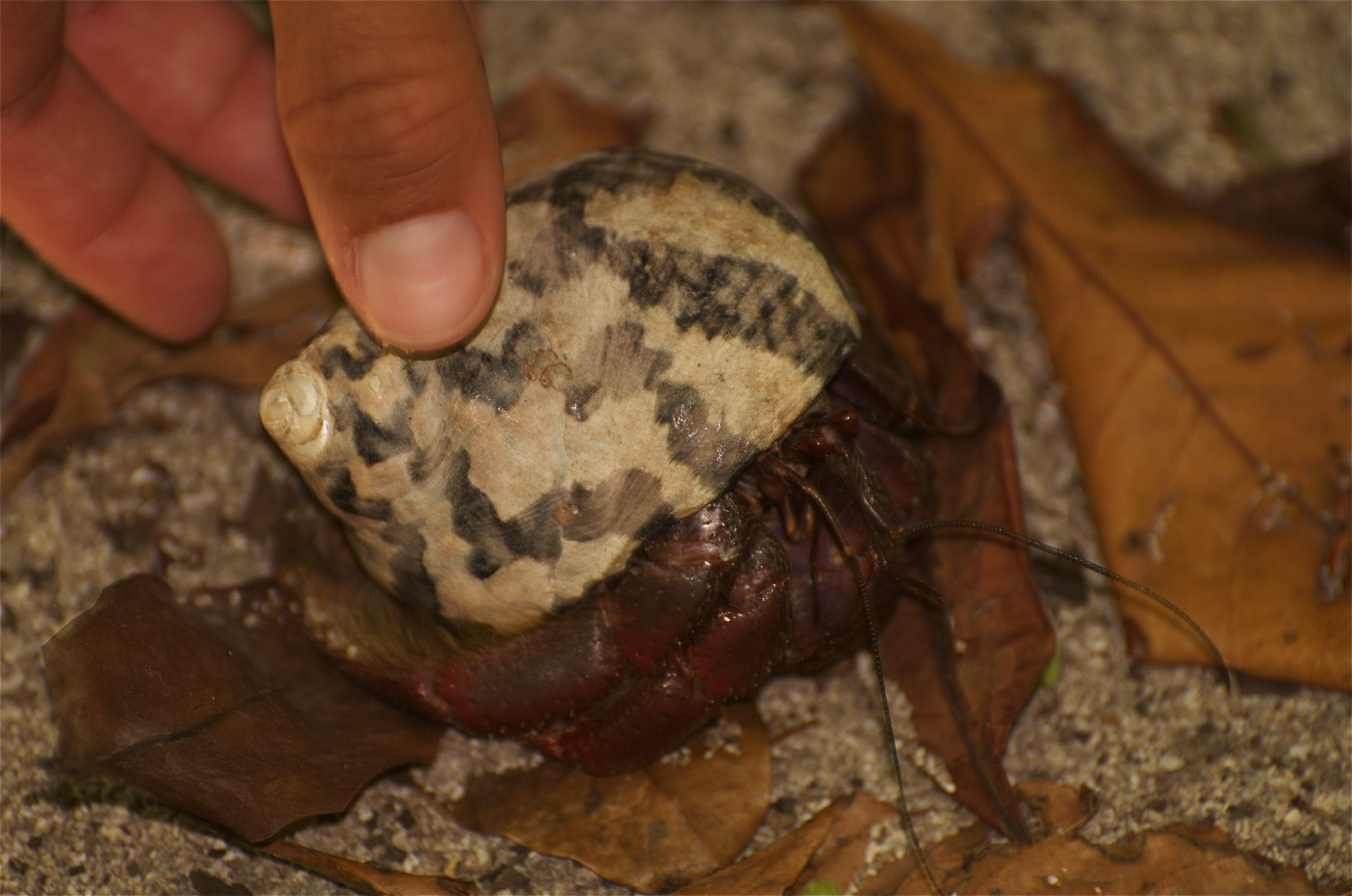
The land hermit crab, Coenobita clypeatus, often uses a shell of Cittarium pica

A small limpet, Lottia leucopleura, often lives on the underside of the shell of this large sea snail. The crab Pinnotheres barbatus is mentioned as a commensal. The sessile vermetid gastropod Dendropoma corrodens (also known as ringed wormsnail) and the tube dwelling polychaete Spirorbis may live attached to the shell of Cittarium pica, as is also the case for several species of algae.

In the wild, the shell of this species is used extensively by the large land hermit crab species Coenobita clypeatus.

== Human use ==
These large sea snails are boiled and eaten in a variety of different local recipes. Because of their popularity as a food item and the problem of overfishing, in the US Virgin Islands there are territorial regulations to protect these snails: no collecting is allowed during their reproductive season, and there is a minimum harvest size regulation.

For a similar reason, Cittarium pica became locally extinct in Bermuda. This caused a serious impact on the land hermit crab populations, because these arthropods need empty Cittarium pica shells (or some other similarly large shell) to use as shelter. Nowadays, Cittarium pica is a legally protected species in Bermuda, where its collection is forbidden.
