= Louis L. Mowbray =

Louis Leon Arthur Mowbray
- Born: 19 August 1877; St. George's, Bermuda
- Died: 5 June 1952 (aged 74)
- Occupation: Naturalist
- Known for: Co-describing the Bermuda petrel (1916); breeding Galapagos tortoises and penguins in captivity
- Spouse: Hilda Higinbotham
- Children: Louis Mowbray

Louis Leon Arthur Mowbray (19 August 1877, St. George's, Bermuda - 5 June 1952) was a Bermudian naturalist.

== Life ==
Mowbray was the only son of schoolteacher William Mowbray and his wife Mary Ann Brown. His father emigrated from Louisiana to Bermuda Island in 1870. In 1906, he observed a live Bermuda petrel of which he wrote the scientific description in 1916 together with John Treadwell Nichols. In 1907, he married Hilda Higinbotham. Their son Louis Mowbray rediscovered the Bermuda petrel in 1951 together with Robert Cushman Murphy and David B. Wingate.

Louis Leon Arthur Mowbray was hired by the Bermuda Natural History Society as director for Bermuda's first aquarium. He ran the aquarium until 1911. In 1911, he became director of the South Boston Aquarium which he ran for three years. In 1914, he became superintendent of the New York Aquarium. Between 1919 and 1923 he spent in Miami where he built up and ran a new aquarium. In 1923, he rejoined the staff of the New York Aquarium and in 1926 he returned to Bermuda.

In 1928 he became director of the Bermuda Aquarium, Museum and Zoo which he ran until 1944.

Mowbray successfully bred the first Galapagos tortoises and Galapagos penguins in captivity.

In 1943, a stroke left him partially paralysed. He quit as curator in 1944 and was succeeded by his son Louis.

On 5 June 1952, he died at the age of 74.
