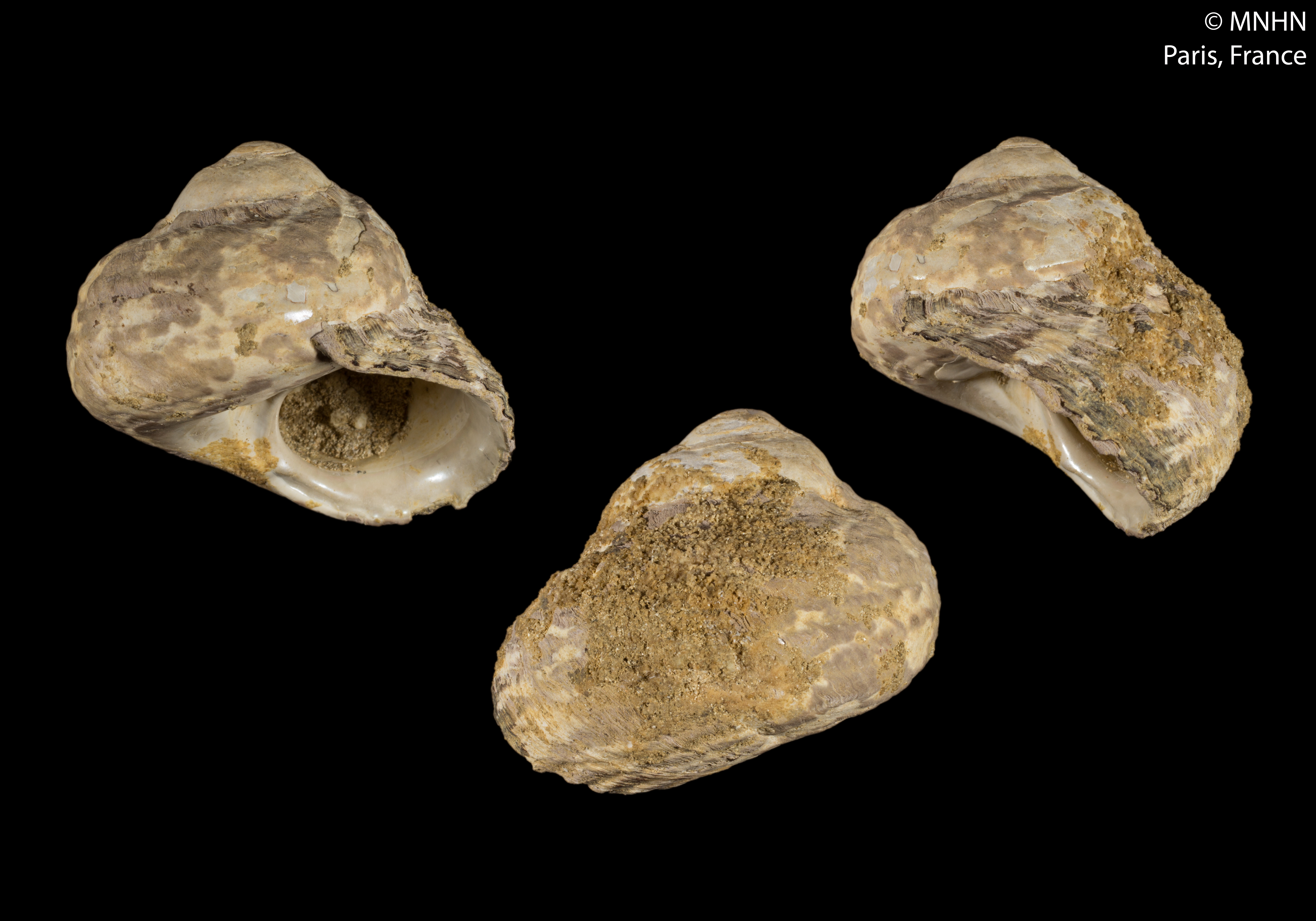
- Shell of Cittarium maestratii (holotype at MNHN, Paris)

Scientific classification
- Kingdom: Animalia
- Phylum: Mollusca
- Class: Gastropoda
- Subclass: Vetigastropoda
- Order: Trochida
- Superfamily: Trochoidea
- Family: Tegulidae
- Genus: Cittarium
- Species: †C. maestratii

Binomial name
- †Cittarium maestratii Lozouet, 2002

= Cittarium maestratii =

Cittarium maestratii Temporal range: Chattian

Extinct species of gastropod

Cittarium maestratii is an extinct species of a sea snail, a marine gastropod mollusk in the family Tegulidae.

It is known from Chattian, a stage of the Late Oligocene.

== Distribution ==
St-Paul-Les-Dax, Aquitaine, France.
