= David B. Wingate =

Bermuda-born ornithologist, naturalist and conservationist (1935–2026)

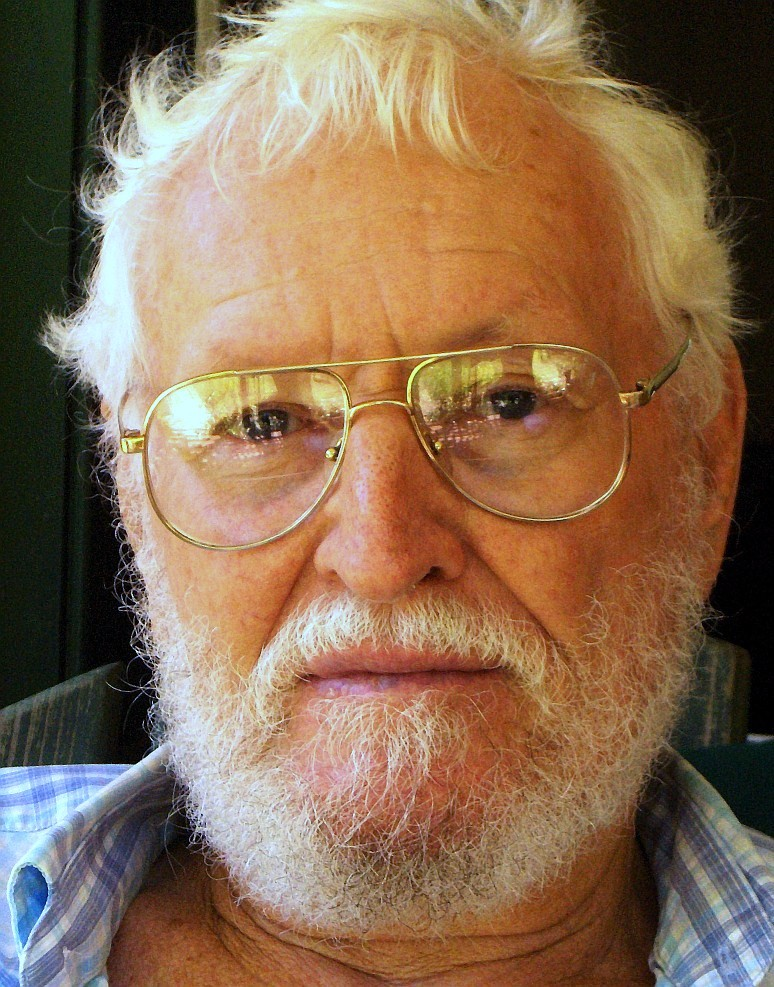
Dr. David B. Wingate

David Balcombe Wingate OBE, (11 October 1935 – 10 November 2026) was a British ornithologist, naturalist and conservationist.

== Life and career ==
David Balcombe Wingate was born in Bermuda, on 11 October 1935. In 1951 he helped Robert Cushman Murphy and Louis S. Mowbray re-discover a bird species thought extinct since the 1620s, the Bermuda petrel or cahow.

This spurred him on to study Zoology at Cornell University, returning to take on the challenge of saving the cahow in 1958. He went on to become the Conservation Officer for the Bermuda Government Parks Department from 1966 to his retirement in 2000.

He was credited with discovering breeding colonies of the black-capped petrel in Haiti in 1963.

His lifelong efforts to bring back the cahow from near-extinction led him to undertake the holistic restoration of an entire barren island's pre-colonial ecology, in a project known as the Nonsuch Island 'Living museum', reintroducing several other species in the process.

Wingate was honoured with a number of awards. These included the Queen's Honours (UK), the MBE and OBE; King's Honours (Netherlands), Ridder, Order of the Golden Ark; the United Nations' Global 500 Award and Dr.of Sci. Honoris causa, Clark University, Massachusetts. In 1991, he was awarded the Linnaean Society of New York's Eisenmann Medal. In 2007 he was nominated for the 2008 Indianapolis prize and in 2017 he was honoured with a Lifetime Achievement award from BirdsCaribbean. In 2012, a biography was published about his life's work.

He had three daughters. His eldest daughter, Janet, has written an award-winning educational autobiography about her father's Nonsuch project, which has been adopted by the Bermuda Education Ministry as a schoolbook. More recently, Rare Birds: The Extraordinary Tale of the Bermuda Petrel and the Man Who Brought It Back from Extinction, a biography of Wingate and the story of his fight to save the cahows, was published in October 2012.

Wingate died on 10 November 2026, aged 91.
