= Bermuda Aquarium, Museum and Zoo =

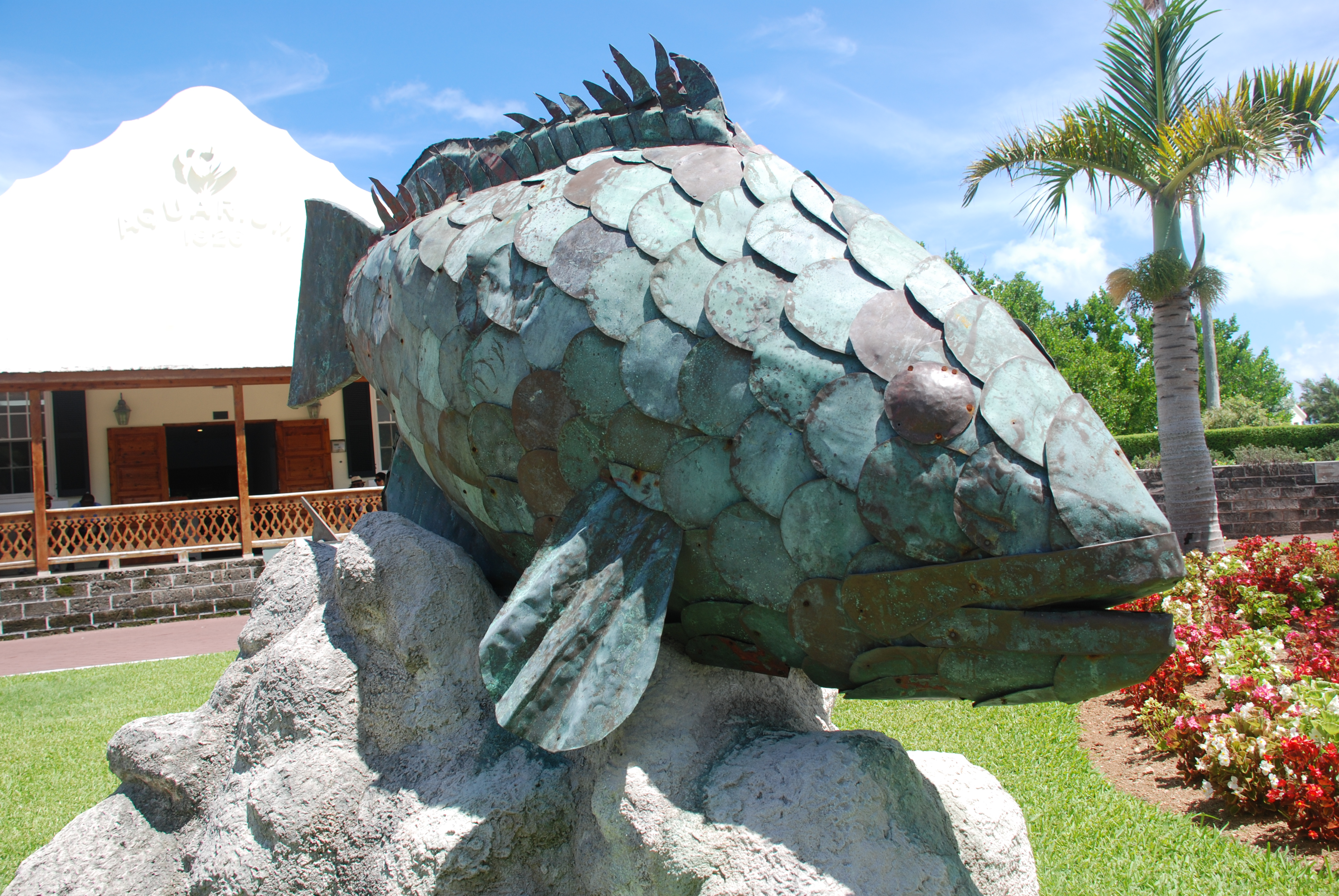
- Interactive map of Bermuda Aquarium, Museum and Zoo
- 32.323396°N 64.737132°W
- Date opened: 1926
- Location: Flatts Village, Bermuda
- No. of animals: 300
- Volume of largest tank: 140,000 U.S. gallons (530,000 L) (North Rock exhibit)
- Annual visitors: 100,000
- Memberships: AZA
- Website: www.bamz.org

The Bermuda Aquarium, Museum and Zoo (BAMZ) is a facility located in Flatts Village, Bermuda, about 700 mi (1,100 km) east of the United States and at the geographic center of Bermuda. It was established in 1926 by the Bermuda government to enhance a growing tourism industry and "to inspire appreciation and care of island environments." The facility focuses on showing oceanic island species and in conservation, education, and research related to these species, and contains an aquarium, a natural history museum, and a zoo.

Support for the institution comes mainly from the Bermuda Zoological Society (BZS) and the Atlantic Conservation Partnership (ACP), both of which are supported primarily by donations and memberships.

The zoo has been accredited by the Association of Zoos and Aquariums (AZA) since 1993, and participates in four Species Survival Plans (SSP) as of 2009.

== History ==
From its opening in 1926 until 1978, BAMZ was supported solely by the Bermuda government. In 1978, the Bermuda Zoological Society (BZS) was formed with the specific goal of supporting BAMZ. As of 2009, the BZS has a membership including 15% of the island's residents, as well as corporate sponsors. The Bermuda government provides support for the operational needs of the zoo, while the BZS supports ongoing development and the educational and research programs, and organizes special events and exhibits.

In 1991 and 1992, a major capital campaign raised $3 million for the construction of the North Rock Exhibit, the Australasia Exhibit, and the Caribbean Exhibit. The Bermuda government matched this funding to create new seawater reservoirs, infrastructure, and a new Education/Administration building.

The Atlantic Conservation Partnership (ACP), a U.S. 501(c)(3) not-for-profit organization, was formed in 1994. ACP is a member and donor supported organization with the goal of furthering knowledge and conservation of island environments, and is now one of the two major support organizations for BAMZ.

In 1997 and 1998 the BZS raised enough money to endow a full-time Education Officer.

Bermudian naturalist Louis L. Mowbray was director of that aquarium from 1928 to 1944. He was succeeded by his son Louis in 1944.

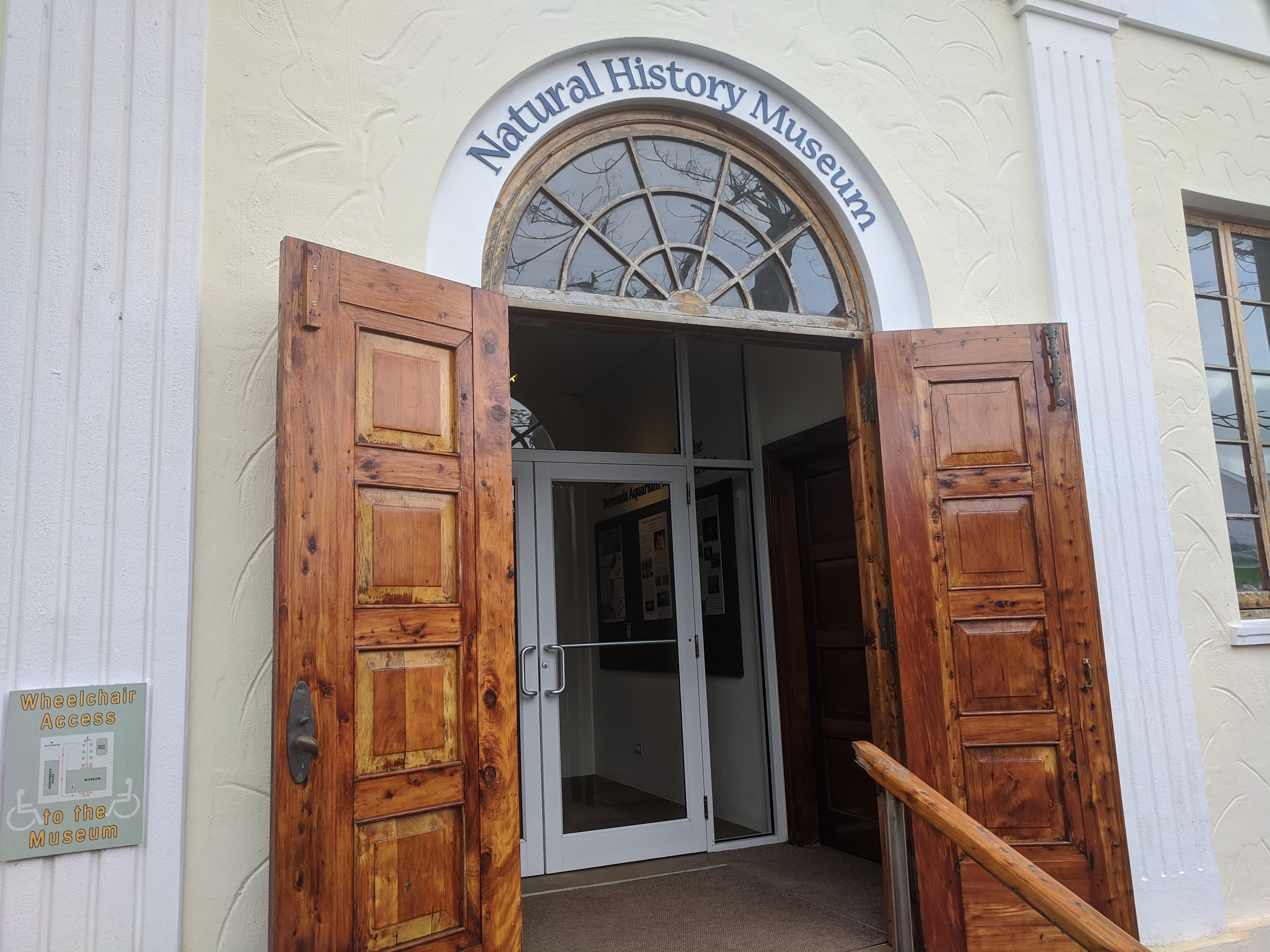
Bermuda Natural History Museum

== Exhibits and other facilities ==
The Aquarium is just inside the main entrance building, and contains over 200 species of fish and invertebrates in many naturalistic displays. The largest display is the 140,000 gallon North Rock Exhibit, which is a living replica of North Rock. The real North Rock is part of the Rim Reef system, the northernmost chain of coral reefs in the world.

Replicating a local reef system and housing one of the largest living coral collections in the world, the zoo section includes mammals, birds, and invertebrates from island ecosystems worldwide. The interactive displays bring visitors close to the animals. The museum offers educational exhibits on Bermuda’s geology and marine biology, making it a comprehensive learning experience.

The Natural History Museum traces the geological formation and ecological development of the island, highlighting the island's role in the migration of many species of birds and marine animals.

Harbor seals and green sea turtles are housed in outdoor exhibits to the right and left of the main entrance.

The South American Aviary is one of the oldest exhibits in the facility. Visitors can walk through the aviary to see many exotic bird species native to the tropics.

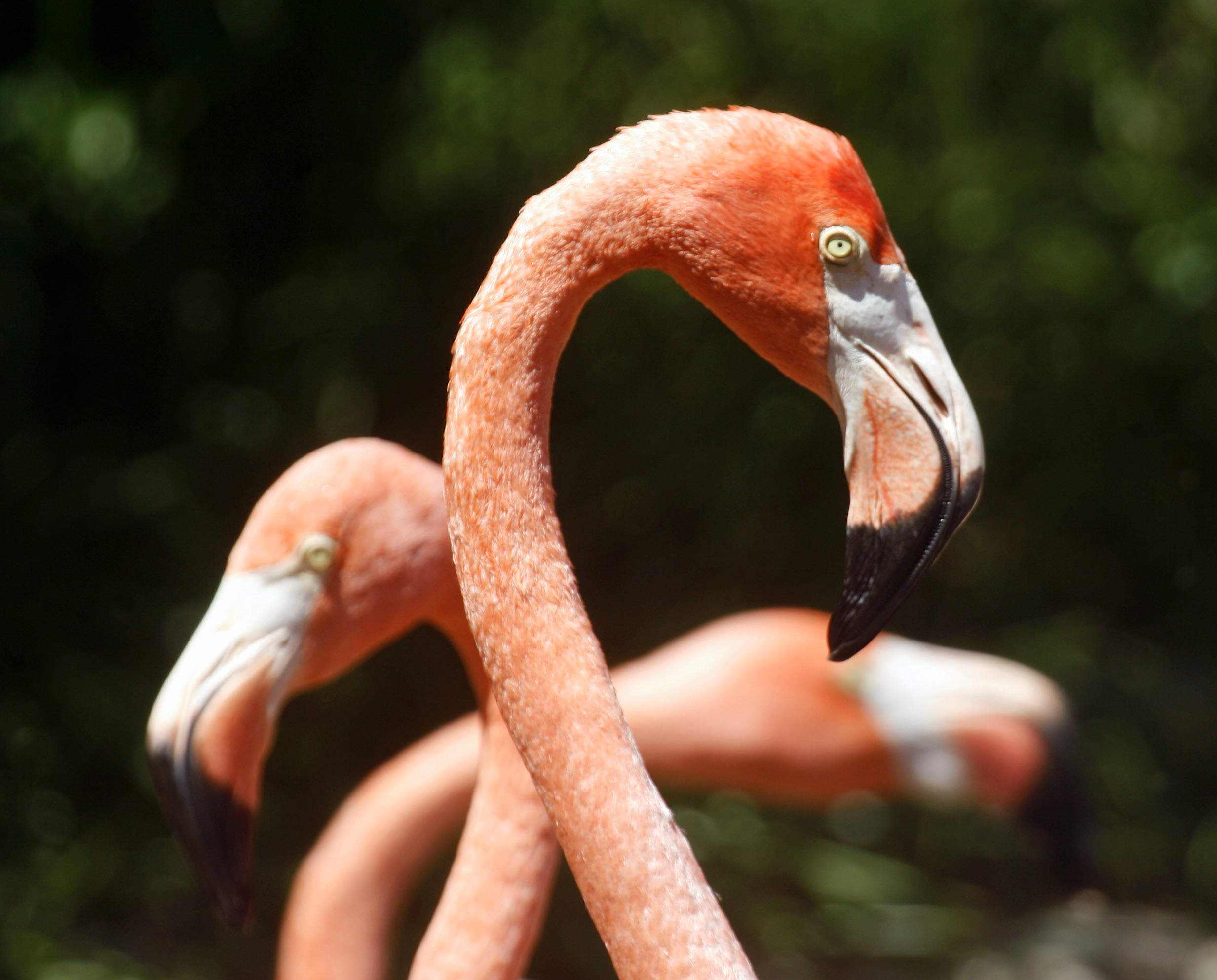
Flamingos at the Bermuda Aquarium, Museum & Zoo

The Caribbean Pink Flamingos exhibit shows flamingos in a natural outdoor lake setting.

The Islands of the Caribbean exhibit showcases animals from the Caribbean islands, and is a large flight cage in which the animals are allowed to roam free. Visitors are confined to a path, but will get to see the animals close up and in their natural habitat.

The Islands of Australasia exhibit is a large indoor exhibit that showcases animals from Australia and Asia.

The Friends of Madagascar exhibit displays animals from Madagascar, most of which can be found only in Madagascar because they developed in isolation on one of the largest islands in the world.

The Local Tails exhibit showcases animals that are native to Bermuda, or have been introduced into the island. It includes a 95-gallon tabletop tank where visitors can touch the animals.

== Conservation ==
The facility participates in four Species Survival Plans (SSP) as of 2009: golden lion tamarin, Matschie's tree kangaroo, Oriental small-clawed otter, ring-tailed lemur. In addition, it is in the population management program for a number of other species: Galápagos tortoise, Haitian slider, harbor seal, Parma wallaby, Prevost's squirrel, red-necked wallaby, roseate spoonbill, scarlet ibis.

== The future ==
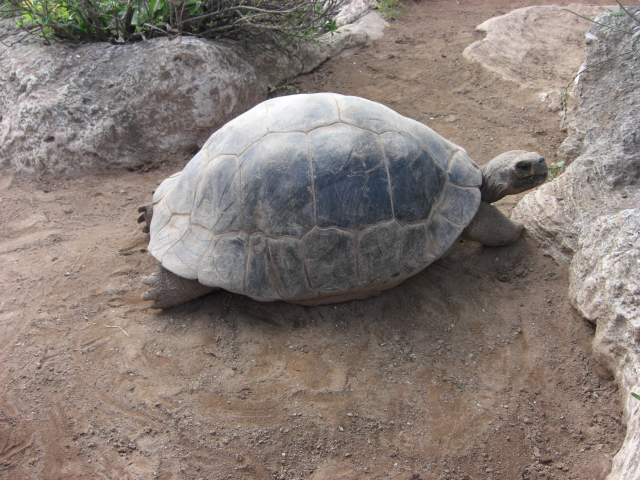
Galápagos tortoise at the Zoo

The institution's second multi-year capital campaign was launched in 2005, with its largest project being a $2.7 million state-of-the-art animal care pavilion. As of 2009, $6.7 million had been donated by individuals, corporations, and organizations (towards a goal of $8.0 million), and the Bermuda government has pledged an additional $2.136 million. The animal care pavilion will be at the center of the zoo next to a new exhibit about the Island of Madagascar.

In addition to the new animal care pavilion, the capital campaign will provide money to increase the existing Education Endowment, create a Conservation Endowment, renovate the front entrance, and improve visitor flow.

Outside the capital fund drive, the Bermuda government has pledged an additional $700,000 for general exhibit updates.
