= Spittal Pond Nature Reserve =

Wildlife sanctuary in Bermuda

Spittal Pond Nature Reserve, Bermuda
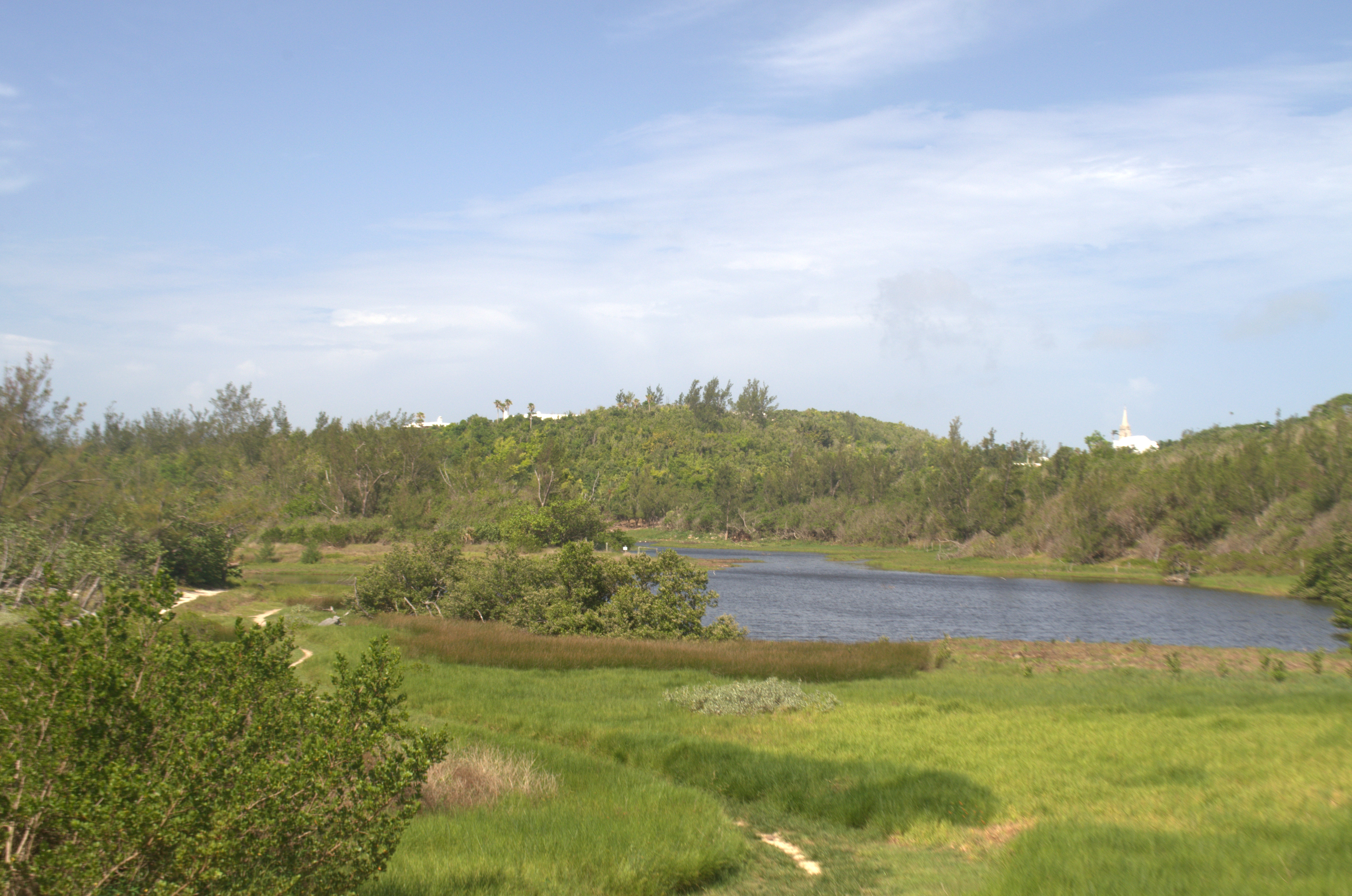
- Spittal Pond in Spittal Pond Nature Reserve

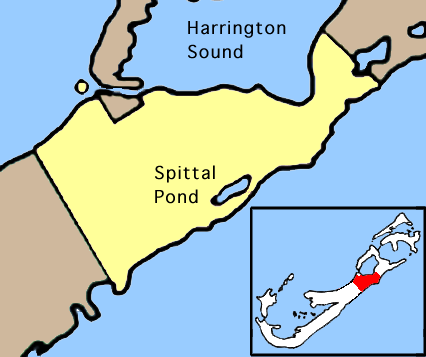
- Location: Spittal Pond
- Nearest city: Hamilton
- Coordinates: 32°18′43″N 64°43′33″W
- Area: 60 acres (24 ha)
- Established: 1999
- Visitors: NA (in NA)
- Governing body: Bermuda Government and the Bermuda National Trust

Ramsar Wetland
- Designated: 11 May 1999
- Reference no.: (6UK005)
- UK Overseas Territories Conservation Forum: UK41006

Spittal Pond Nature Reserve is the largest wildlife sanctuary in Bermuda, located close to the Atlantic coast of Smith's Parish. Surrounding the third largest pond in Bermuda, Spittal Pond, it covers an area of 60 acres (24 ha). It is one of 13 parks or reserves managed by the Bermuda Department of Conservation Services which protects and conserves environmentally critical areas and habitats. The pond reserve, a wetland site, is one of the seven Ramsar Sites in Bermuda, which was approved on 10 May 1999 for the criteria (i, iii and iv) of its unique characteristics such as its lagoon which is permanently brackish, ecology featuring wet grassland and mangrove forests, seasonal shorebirds, other ver run waterbirds and European eels. It is also home to many types of species mostly including birds. Spittal Pond sometimes appears pink due to the presence of certain algae and microorganisms that thrive in the saline conditions. These organisms produce pigments that give the water a pink hue, especially during warmer months.

== Geography ==
Spittal Pond Nature Reserve is situated in the Smith's Parish. The habitat comprises rocky shore habitat which includes limestone pavement formation called "the Checkerboard". Ostensibly fresh water, with no connection to the nearby Atlantic, the pond is in fact brackish as the ocean can inundate the lake during severe storms. Hurricanes and gales with strong winds are a common feature. Hurricane tides and waves impact the pond on its south coast line (extending over a length of 1.4 kilometres (0.87 mi) consisting of the reef line is only 100–200 metres (330–660 ft) off shore. A very thin line of small hillocks separate the pond from the ocean and there are also three low lands through which waves flood the lake during hurricanes. The 2003 hurricane is reported to have caused a 12 metres (39 ft) wave height inundating the pond with silt, boulders and trees causing serious disturbance in its ecological conditions. In such circumstances, parts of the lake can become discoloured and malodorous due to the work of sulphur-producing bacteria which thrive in brackish conditions. The reserve is mudflats and salt marsh in 80% of its area, with 10% comprising freshwater, 6% tidal flats, 3% salt marshes and 1% rocky shores. The watershed is formed by hills surrounding which are densely forested.

Climate in the area is subtropical with mild temperatures and humid conditions. The habitat of the reserve is ideal for migratory and resident birds and also water birds. Apart from the main Spittal Pond there are two other smaller ponds adjoining this Ramsar site, which were excavated in 1966 for fresh water. The fluctuation in the water is reported to be about 75 centimetres (30 in) depending on the incidence of rain and flooding from the sea during the hurricanes. During low water levels mudflats get exposed in the lake. The dominant geological formation is limestone with fossils of palmetto stumps and fronds embedded in it.

Tropical trees, plants and flowers enrich the reserve during summer months. The winter season provides one of the best vistas for visitors walking along the many small trails in the park.

== History ==
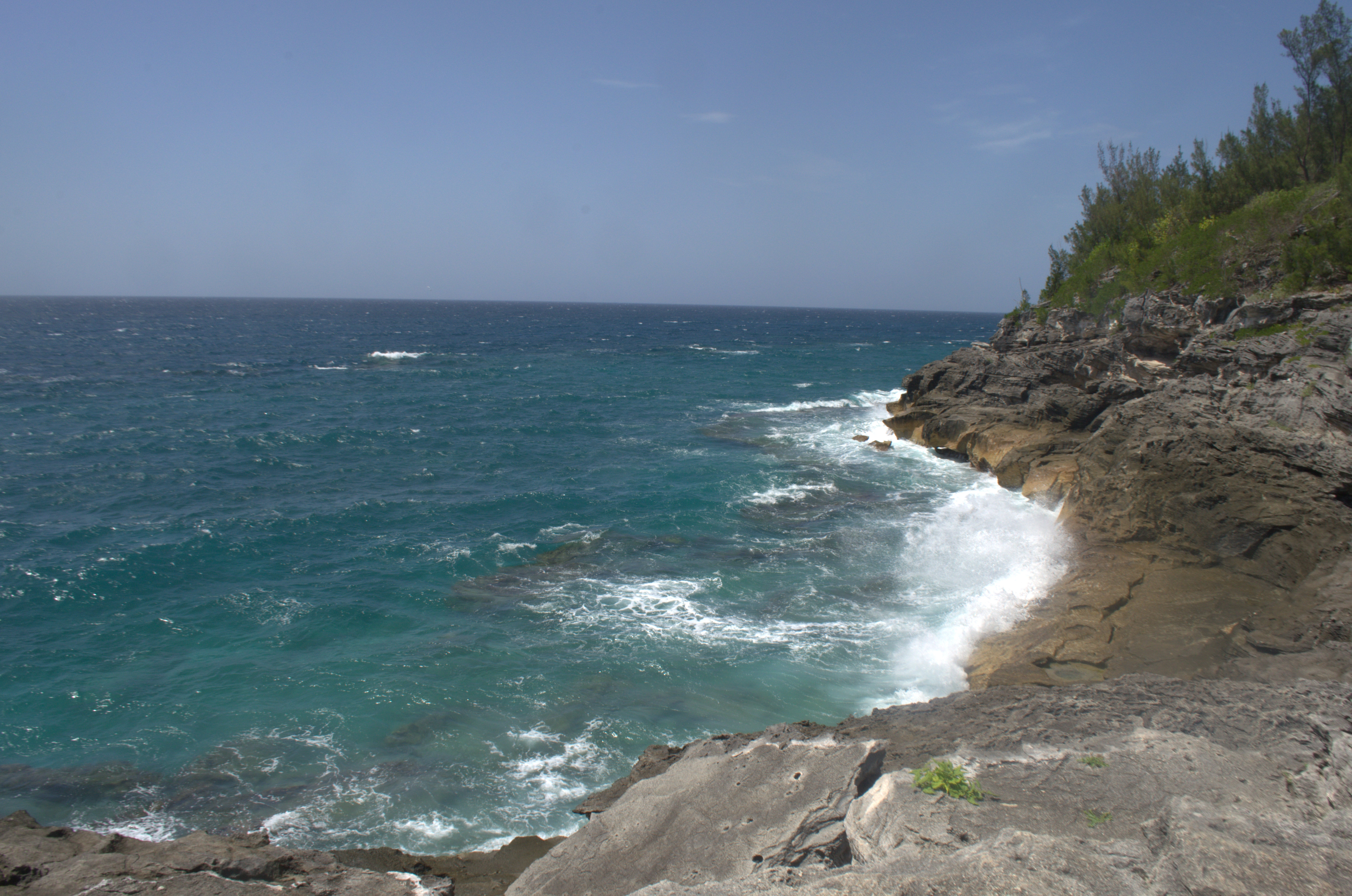
Spittal Pond National Park cliffs

The origin of the name is uncertain, although it can probably be traced to one of several places in Scotland that have Spittal as part of their names. In the past it was also known as Brackish Pond (due to its brackish water), Peniston's Pond (named after the family who owned these lands) and as Spittal Pond in 1890 (as referred to in Stark's Illustrated Bermuda Guide 1890). As the location of the pond and the land surrounding it were used as a hospital and grazing ground for cattle, the name Spittal has been used.

Initially, in the early part of the 20th century, this reserve was made up of 10 blocks of private land, oriented in a north to south direction. It was not subject to development as it was a salty marsh. In 1946, Dr. Henry Wilkinson, medical doctor, historian, and the founder of the Bermuda Historical Monuments Trust, who owned part of this land (about 4.5 acres), converted his holdings into a reserve, adjoining the Spittal Pond Bird Sanctuary. Over the years, the Bermudian government bought more land in the area and established the Spittal Pond Reserve, which is owned by the government and the Trust. Spittal Pond is now reported to be the largest nature reserve and wildlife sanctuary in Bermuda.

There is mention of a Portuguese shipwreck on this shore dated to 1545 AD, though not confirmed, as when George Somers came to this island in 1609 AD there were no Portuguese settlers on the island. A geological feature of historical importance is the "Spanish Rock", (also known as "Portuguese Rock") a rocky cliff overlooking the ocean with inscriptions of the year 1543 AD and indistinct other writings. Inscriptions have been interpreted as along with other markings "RP" (abbreviated version of Rex Portugaliae, King of Portugal) and a cross denoting the Portuguese Order of Christ. This rock piece has been taken out and replaced by a bronze plaque. A replica made in plaster of Paris is displayed in the Bermuda Historical Society Museum at Hamilton.

In view of its varied habitats and rich wildlife, particularly wintering waterfowl, the Spittal Pond and vicinity was declared a Wetland of International Importance, a Ramsar Site, in 1999.

In 1987, Hurricane Emily caused extensive damage to the casuarina forest in the reserve. On 5 September 2003 severe damage was caused to the reserve by Hurricane Fabian. It was the strongest hurricane to hit Bermuda since Hurricane Arlene in 1963. It was both the most damaging and the first hurricane to cause a death on the island since 1926. In September 2010 Hurricane Igor also caused more damage to the reserve.

== Wildlife ==
=== Flora ===
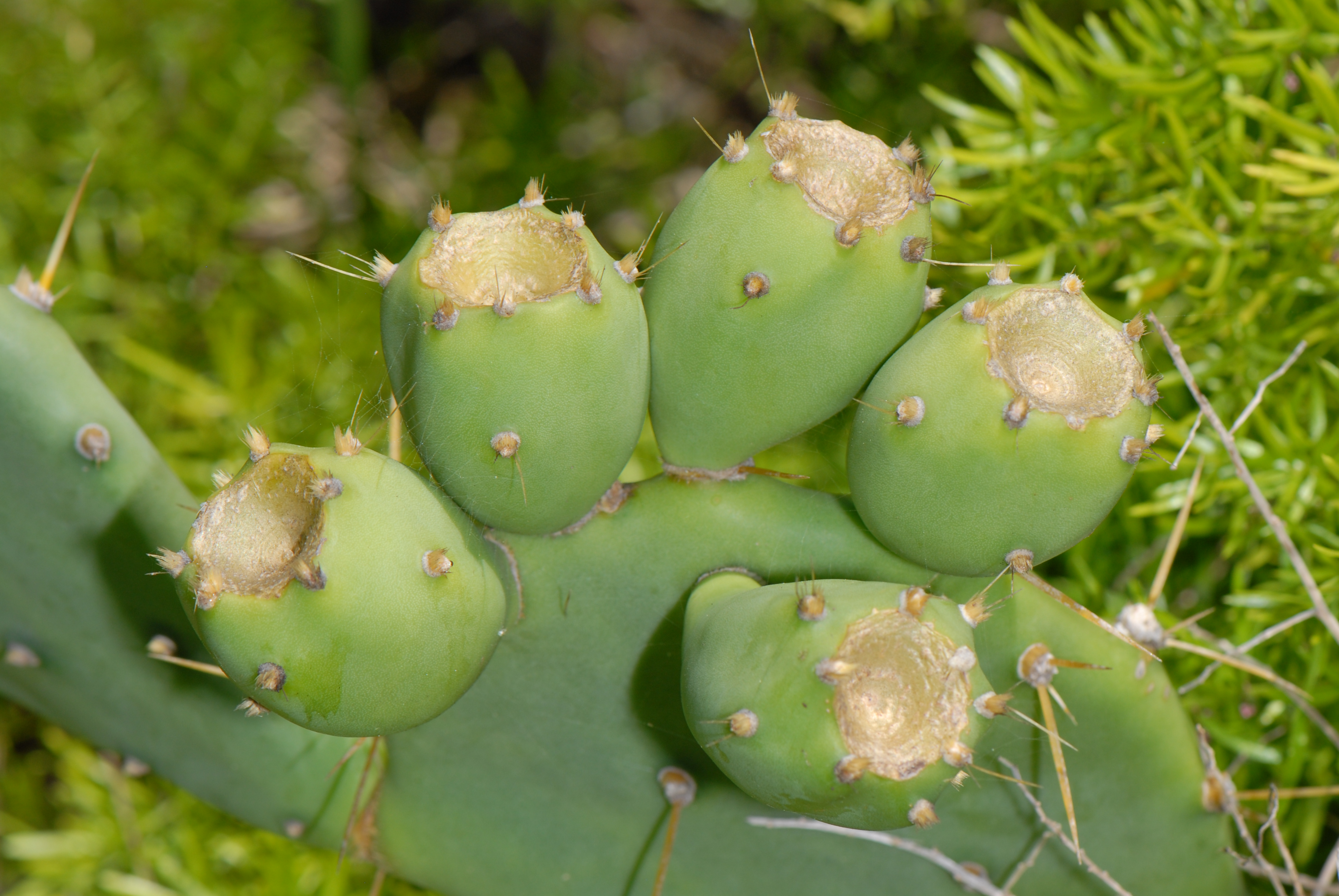
Opuntia stricta, Spittal Pond Nature Reserve, Bermuda

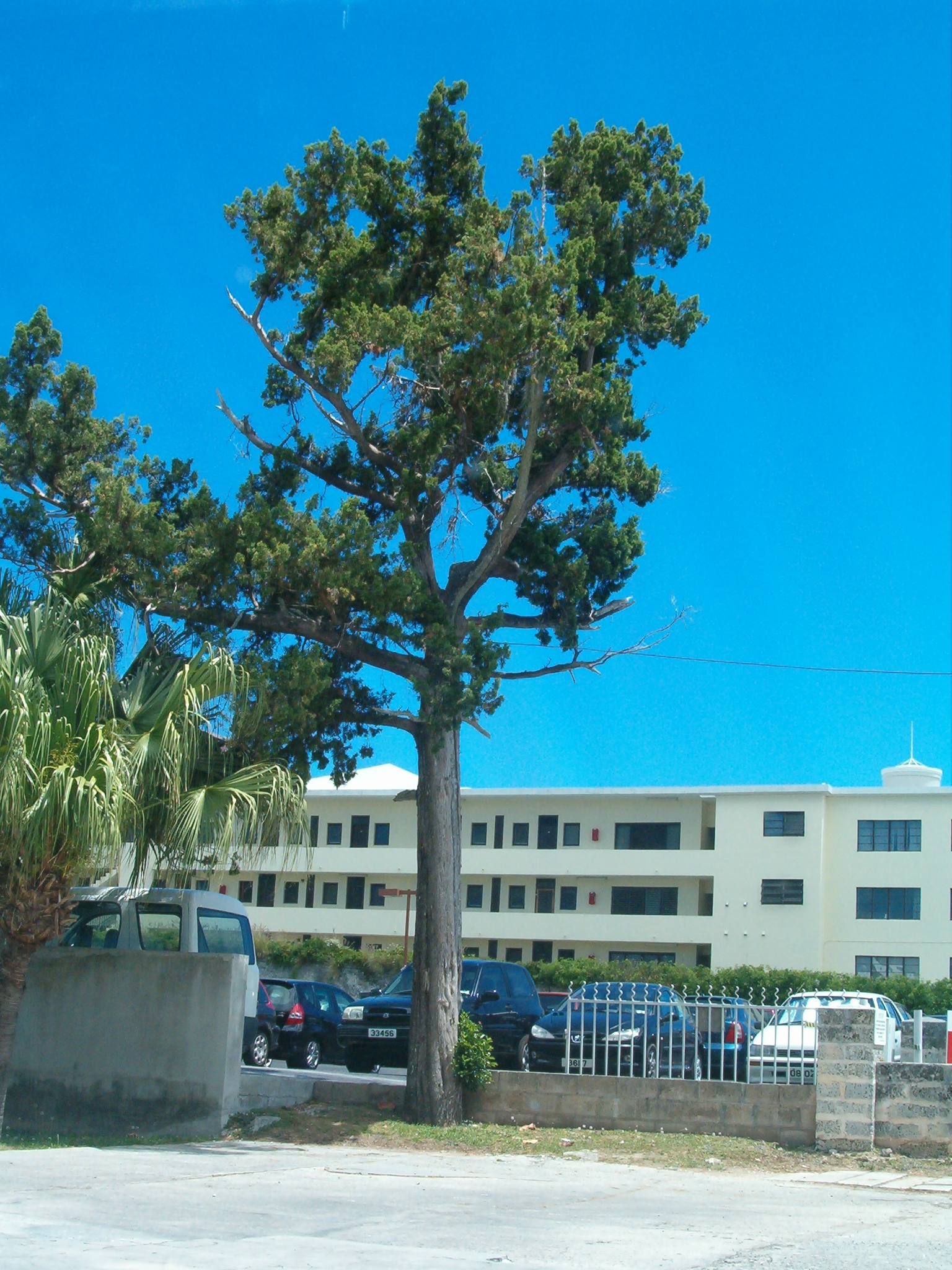
Bermuda cedar tree in Bermuda near Hamilton

Many of the endemic plants that once lived here, especially the Bermuda cedar (Juniperus bermudiana), have been displaced by introduced species such as the Mexican pepper (Schinus terebinthifolius), Australian whistling-pine (Casuarina equisetifolia), fiddlewood (Citharexylum spinosum), Chinese fan palm (Livistona chinensis), and asparagus fern (Asparagus densiflorus). There are mangrove swamps, salt marsh (created by flooding of the pond by the sea during storms), and also large areas of woodland. Palmetto (Sabal bermudana), bay grapes (Coccoloba uvifera), and allspice (Pimenta dioica) are also reported from the area. Shrubs found here are mostly lantana, Spanish bayonet (Yucca aloifolia) and fluorescent green flopper (Kalanchoe pinnata). Plans to replace the casuarina plantation with native, endemic and selected non-invasive ornamentals have been suggested.

=== Fauna ===
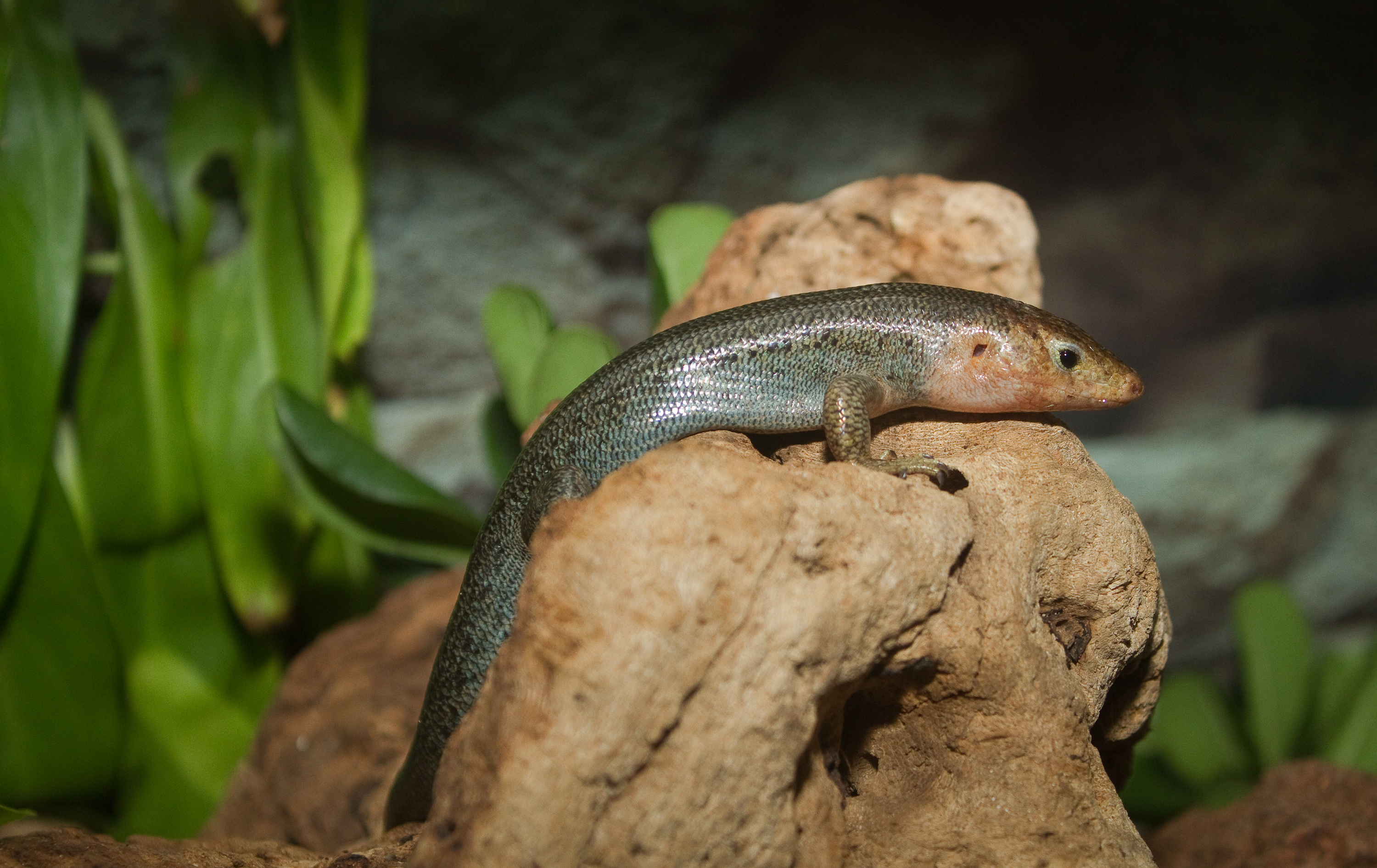
The Bermuda rock skink (Plestiodon longirostris, formerly known as Eumeces longirostris).

Other wildlife found in Spittal Pond Nature Reserve include the Bermuda rock skink (Plestiodon longirostris), a critically endangered species, silver-haired bat (Lasionycteris noctivagans), Sally Lightfoot crab and buckeye (butterfly) (Junonia coenia). Migrating humpback whales coming out from Portuguese Rock can also be seen in the spring season. Eel (Anguilla anguilla) is commonly found here.

==== Birds ====
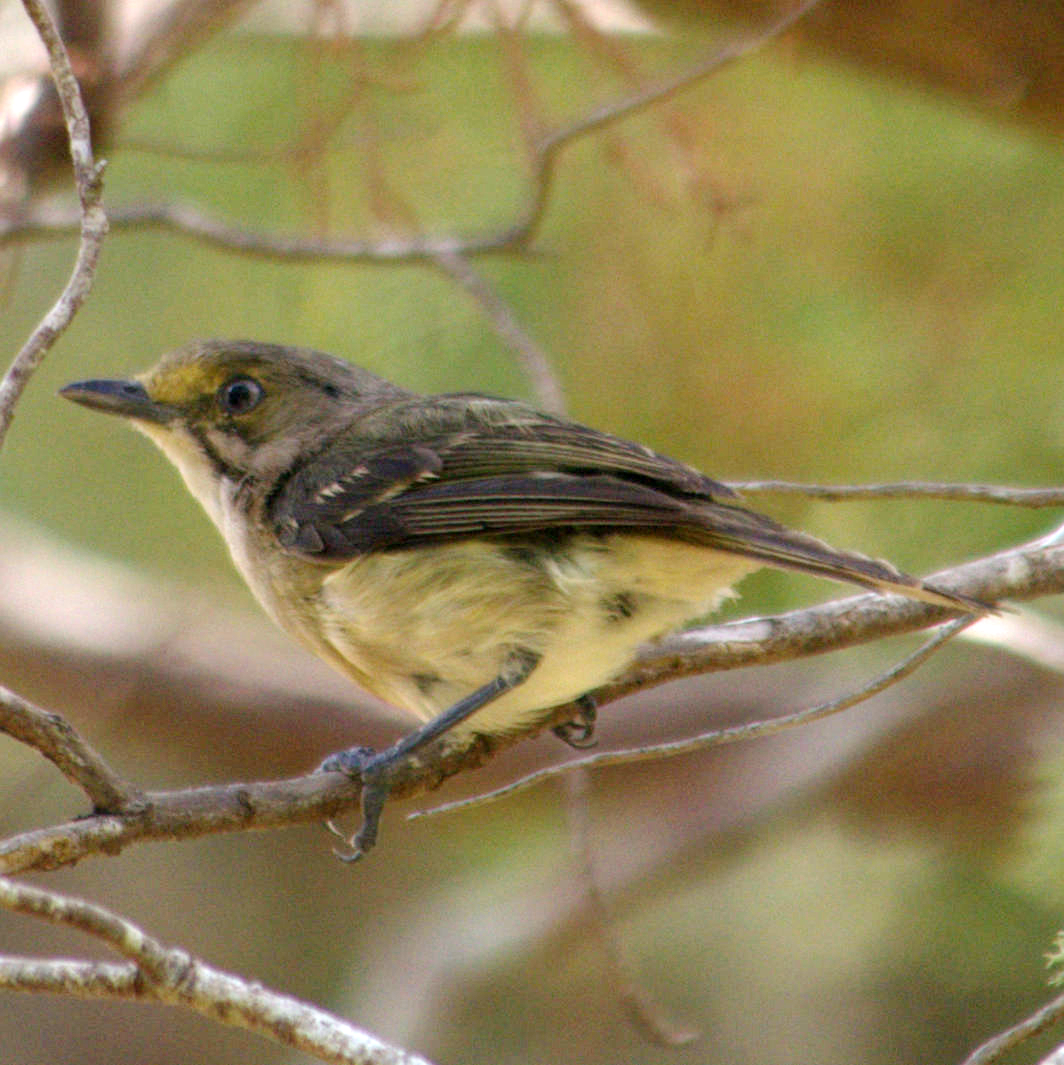
The Bermuda White-eyed vireo is a subspecies of White-eyed Vireo, endemic to Bermuda, which is more drab and has shorter wings.

The lake is a major transition area for migratory birds crossing the Atlantic Ocean, and as such is a good birdwatching area. Twenty bird species regularly winter here, while 200 species are reported as migratory birds. There are 25 species of waterfowl, such as geese and flamingoes, which are common sights. Some of the common species of birds reported are Bermuda white-eyed vireo, cattle egret, great egret, snowy egret, American black duck, ring-necked duck, American wigeon, Eurasian teal and blue-winged teal. There are also waders, coots, moorhens, and great blue, green and tricoloured herons. During the spring season longtails, or white-tailed tropicbirds, are a common sight. Shorebirds include various shanks, dowitchers and sandpipers. Eastern mosquitofish occur in large numbers, helping with mosquito control and providing food for the herons. White-tailed tropicbirds are reported to nest on the coastal cliffs.
