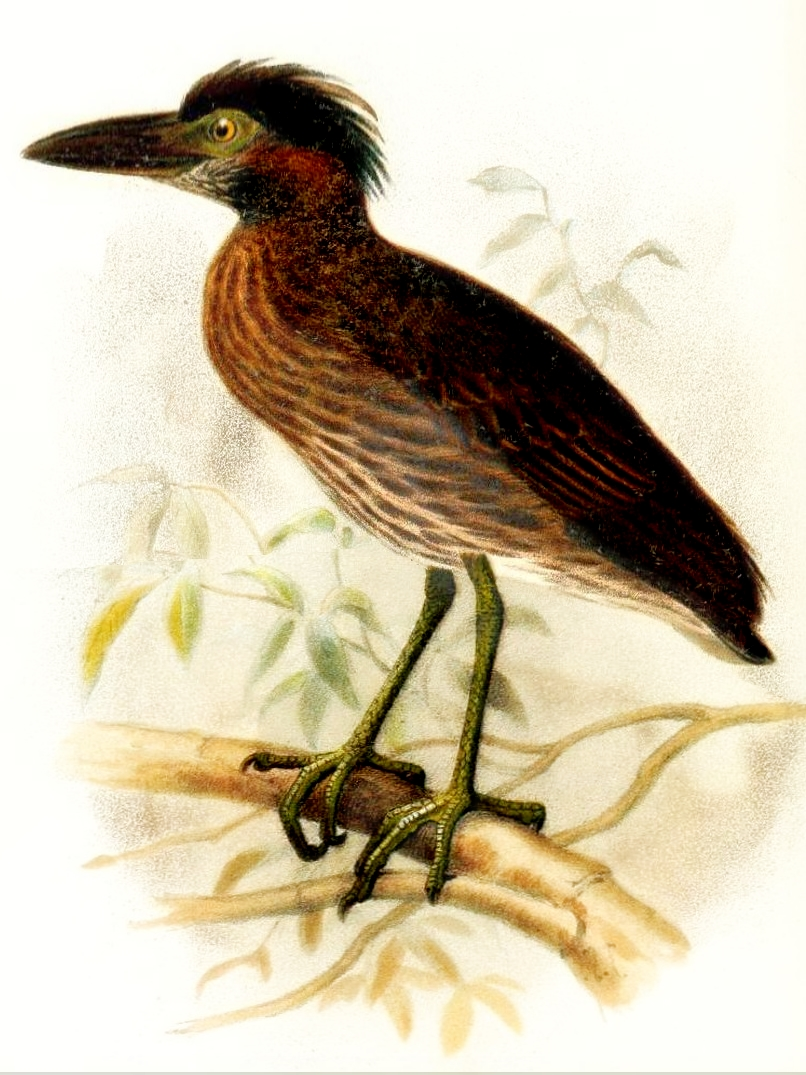

Conservation status
- Extinct (1610) (IUCN 3.1)

Scientific classification
- Kingdom: Animalia
- Phylum: Chordata
- Class: Aves
- Order: Pelecaniformes
- Family: Ardeidae
- Genus: Nyctanassa
- Species: †N. carcinocatactes

Binomial name
- †Nyctanassa carcinocatactes Olson & Wingate, 2006

= Bermuda night heron =

Extinct species of bird

The Bermuda night heron (Nyctanassa carcinocatactes) is an extinct heron species from Bermuda.

== Taxonomy ==
This species was first described by Storrs L. Olson & David B. Wingate (2006) from subfossil material found in the Pleistocene and Holocene deposits in caves and ponds of Bermuda.

== Description ==
Its anatomy was rather similar to its living relative, the yellow-crowned night heron (Nyctanassa violacea), but it had a heavier bill, a more massive skull and more robust hind limbs. The specialization of the bill and the hind limbs showed that it was apparently adapted to feeding on land crabs.

== Extinction ==
There are early historian reports referring to the species. It possibly became extinct due to the settlement of the Bermuda islands in the 17th century. On Bermuda, the aforementioned yellow-crowned night heron was introduced in the 1970s to act as its proxy in the ecosystem, mostly to act as biological control for land crabs, which have dug holes that interfere with the island's golf courses. Due to being generalist feeders instead of specialised feeders like N. carcinocatactes, N. violacea has been recorded to have caused record declines in land crab populations, as well as feeding on the critically endangered Bermuda rock lizard.
