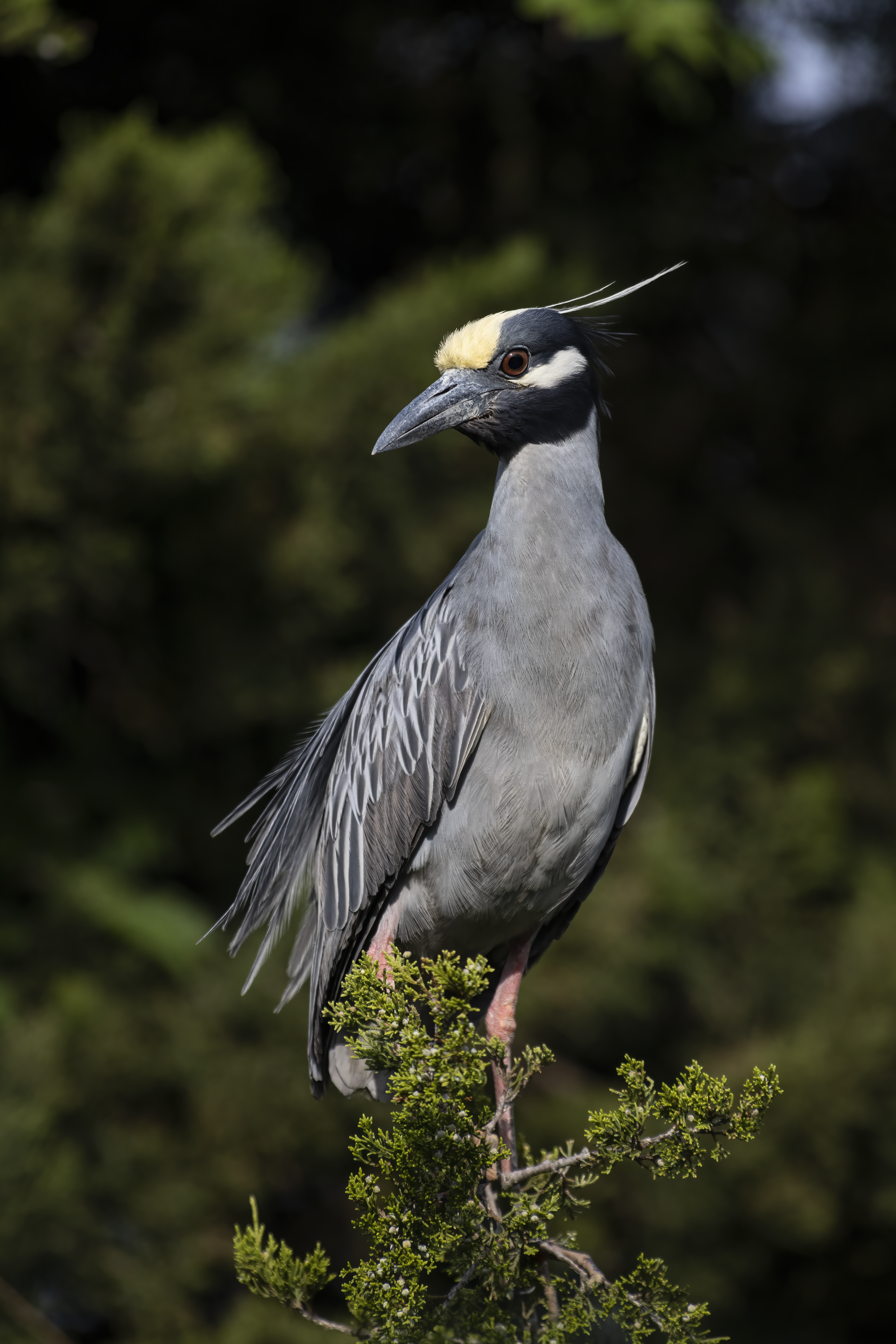
- Perched at a rookery in Cape May County

Conservation status
- Least Concern (IUCN 3.1)

Scientific classification
- Kingdom: Animalia
- Phylum: Chordata
- Class: Aves
- Order: Pelecaniformes
- Family: Ardeidae
- Genus: Nyctanassa
- Species: N. violacea

Binomial name
- Nyctanassa violacea (Linnaeus, 1758)
- Range of N. violacea Breeding range Year-round range Wintering range

Synonyms
- Ardea violacea Linnaeus, 1758; Nycticorax violaceus (Linnaeus, 1758)

= Yellow-crowned night heron =

Yellow-crowned night heron Temporal range: Middle Pleistocene–Recent

Species of bird

The yellow-crowned night heron (Nyctanassa violacea) is one of two species of night heron in the genus Nyctanassa. Unlike the black-crowned night heron, which has a worldwide distribution, the yellow-crowned is restricted to the Americas. It is known as the bihoreau violacé in French and the pedrete corona clara or yaboa común in some Spanish-speaking countries.

== Taxonomy ==
The yellow-crowned night heron was formally described by the Swedish naturalist Carl Linnaeus in 1758 in the tenth edition of his Systema Naturae. He placed it with herons, cranes and egrets in the genus Ardea and coined the binomial name Ardea violacea. Linnaeus based his account on the "crested bittern" that had been described in 1729–1732 by the English naturalist Mark Catesby in the first volume of his The Natural History of Carolina, Florida and the Bahama Islands. Linnaeus specified the type locality as North America, but this has been restricted to the Carolinas following Catesby. The yellow-crowned night heron is now placed together with the extinct Bermuda night heron in the genus Nyctanassa that was introduced in 1887 by the Norwegian born zoologist Leonhard Stejneger. Its congener, the Bermuda night heron (N. carcinocatactes), was endemic to Bermuda, but probably became extinct following human colonization.

Being a heron, the yellow-crowned night heron is related to egrets and bitterns (the family Ardeidae), and, more distantly, to pelicans and ibises (the order Pelecaniformes). The night herons (Nyctanassa and Nycticorax) belong to the Ardeinae subfamily, and are considered to have most recently diverged from the herons of Butorides, Ardeola, and Ardea (e.g., green heron, squacco heron, and great blue heron respectively).

Various classifications recognize either five or six subspecies, but little is known as to how much they are integrated together and how much their geographic range varies. Their body size decreases from north to south, and the shape of their bills varies geographically, depending on the size of the crustaceans they eat in different regions.

Fossils of the yellow-crowned night heron dating to the Middle Pleistocene have been recovered from the Okeechobee Formation in St. Lucie County, Florida, while additional Late Pleistocene remains are known from Abaco in the Bahamas.

=== Subspecies ===
Five or six subspecies are recognised:

- N. v. violacea (Linnaeus, 1758) – central, east USA to east Mexico and east Costa Rica
- N. v. bancrofti (Huey, 1927) – west Mexico to west Nicaragua, Socorro Island and West Indies
- N. v. gravirostris (Van Rossem, 1943) – Socorro Island, Tres Marías; not recognized by IOC
- N. v. caliginis (Wetmore, 1946) – Panama and west Colombia to Peru
- N. v. cayennensis (Gmelin, JF, 1789) – Panama and northeast Colombia to northeast Brazil
- N. v. pauper (Sclater, PL & Salvin, 1870) – Galápagos Islands

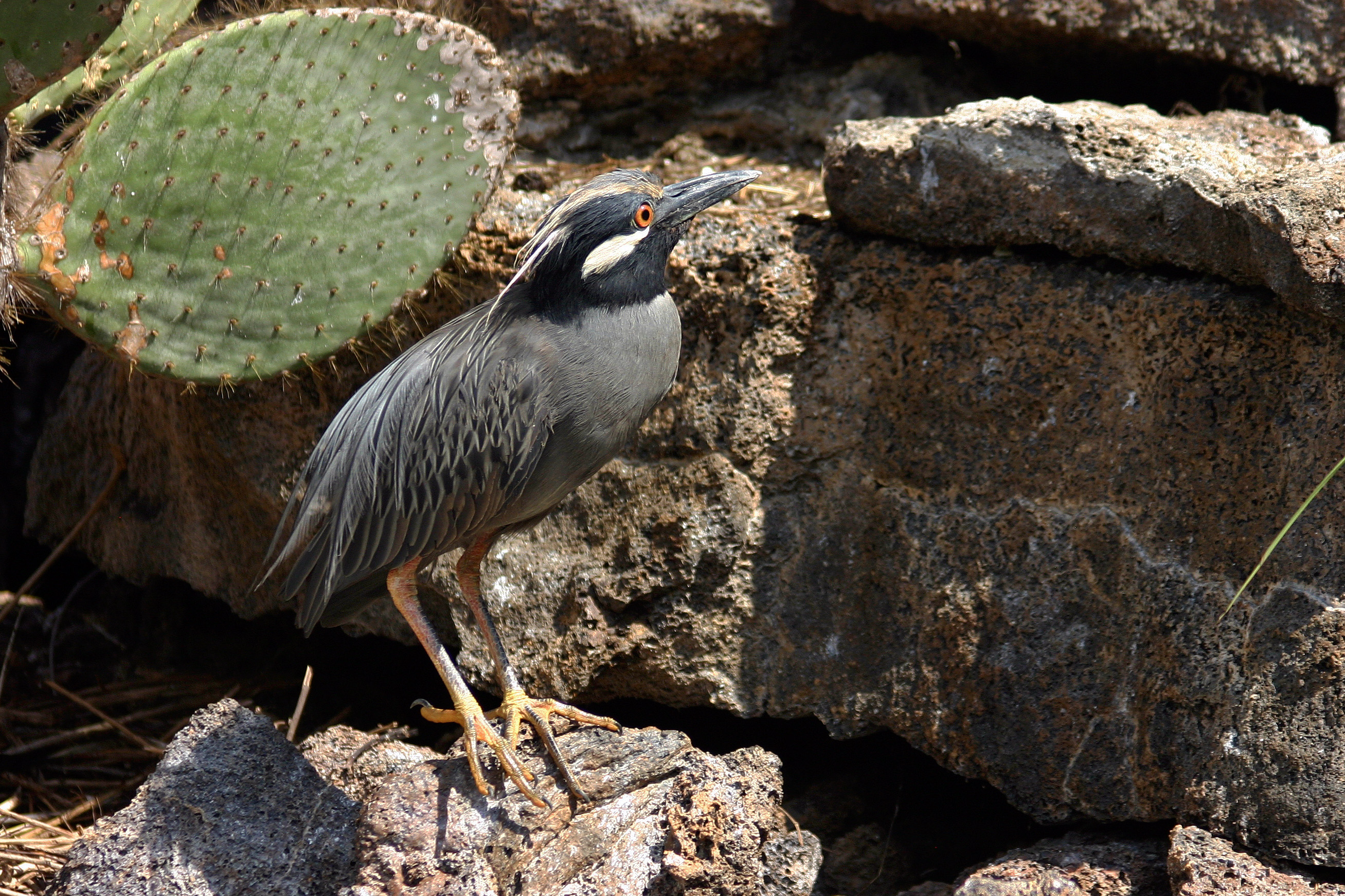
Adult N. v. pauper, North Seymour Island, Galapagos Islands

== Etymology ==
The genus name Nyctanassa combines the Ancient Greek: νύξ : núx, genitive νυκτός : nuktós meaning "night" with άνασσα : ánassa meaning "queen" or "lady".

The species name is from Latin: violaceous meaning "violet-coloured".

== Distribution and migration ==
The yellow-crowned night heron is found exclusively in the Americas, and its distribution depends closely on food (mainly crustaceans) availability.

=== Winter and year-round range ===
It winters where the climate allows for year-round crab activity: tropical and subtropical regions, southern Florida, the Gulf Coast (Louisiana to Alabama), and the eastern Texas coast. It is also found in Mexico, Central America, the Galápagos Islands, the Caribbean and northern South America (south to Peru and Brazil in coastal regions) where it is generally resident.

=== Breeding range ===
From 1925 to 1960, the yellow-crowned night heron spread northward for reasons still not clear. In addition to its winter and year-round range, it can be found in the south-east inland of the United States during breeding season, and additional isolated breeding colonies have been recorded even farther inland, all the way to the northern border of the United States.

=== Migration ===
Different subspecies and populations have different migratory behaviour. Subspecies and populations that are insular or live in warmer areas are confirmed to be sedentary. The tropical subspecies and populations migrate, but to an extent that is still unclear for lack of data. The migratory behaviour of the yellow-crowned night heron has changed with its expansion north: one subspecies (Nyctanassa violacea violacea) migrates to the northern limits of its range, moving north and west after breeding. Birds observed outside of the normal range are usually first-years or strays.

Migration occurs in mid-March in lower latitude, and from mid-March to April in higher latitude.

== Description ==
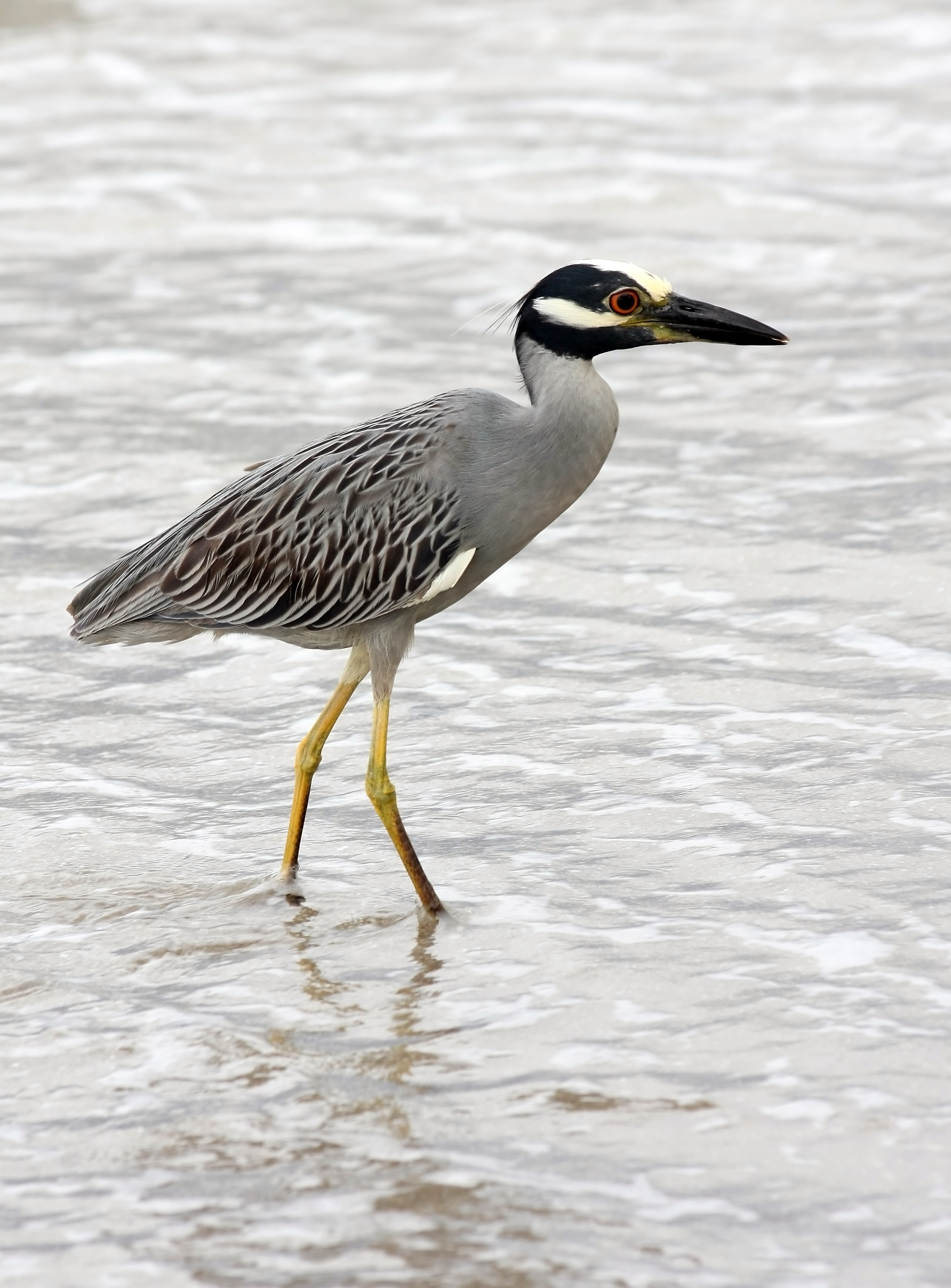
In Florida

=== General shape ===
The yellow-crowned night heron is a rather stocky wading bird, ranging from 55 to 70 cm (1 ft 10 in – 2 ft 4 in) and from 650 to 850 g (1.43–1.87 lb), the females being a little smaller than the males. The yellow-crowned night heron has a wingspan ranging from 101 to 112 cm (3 ft 4 in – 3 ft 8 in). The neck, slim when extended, exposes its large head (compared to its body), with a large and heavy bill.

=== Colors ===
The body and back are a smooth grey-blue, with a black scaled pattern on the wings. The long legs are yellow and turn coral, pink or red during courtship.

The most characteristic part of the yellow-crowned night heron is the head: black and glossy, with white cheeks and a pale yellow crown going from the bill, between the eyes and to the back of the head, giving the bird its common name. Such colours make the face appear striped in a horizontal black-white-black-white pattern. Long, thin, white feathers grow to the back of the crown during mating season. The bill, also black, is thick and deeply set under the eyes which are dark orange or red.

=== Flight ===
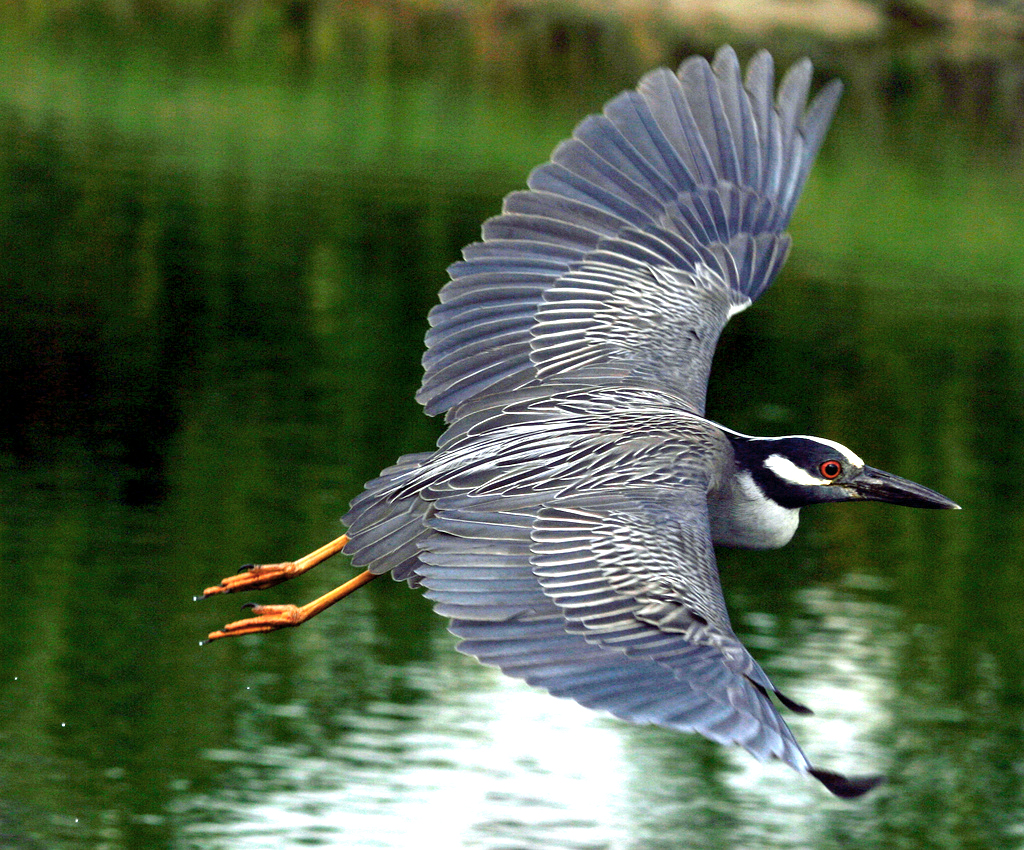
In flight

Like all herons, the yellow-crowned night heron flies with long, slow purposeful wing beats. It can be found gliding over water with its legs easily visible, extended straight below the tail, unlike the black-crowned night heron, whose legs can barely be seen in flight.

=== Juveniles and immatures ===
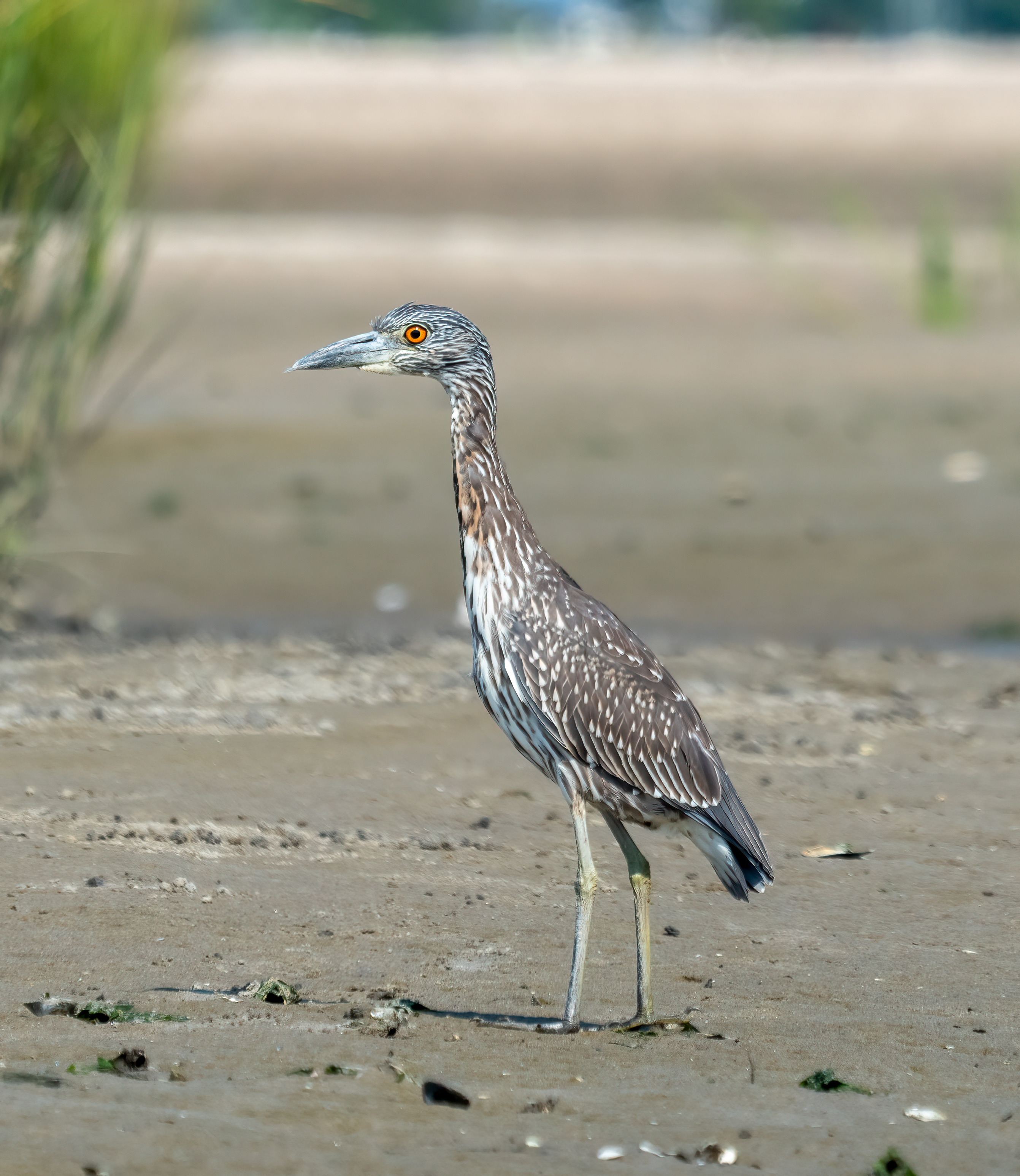
Juvenile, in New York City

It takes about three years for yellow-crowned night herons to acquire the full physical appearance of adults. Before that, the young birds show signs of immaturity, such as a brownish body, an overall greyish head, drab colors and spots and streaks on their plumage.

Although the adults are easy to tell apart, juvenile yellow-crowned night heron can look very similar to juvenile black-crowned night heron. Yellow-crowned juveniles tend to stand straighter and have heavier bills and longer legs, and their spots and streaks are finer than those of the black-crowned.

== Habitat ==
The yellow-crowned night heron looks for shallow water to live in: marshes, wooded swamps, and lakeshores for inland populations, and thickets, mangroves and cliff-bound coasts for coastal populations. It can also be found in areas that do not always have enough water, but that get flooded on a regular basis. Its habitat is closely linked to that of the crustaceans that make for most of its diet, and it tolerates fresh water, brackish water and saltwater.

Another important habitat factor is nesting sites. The yellow-crowned night heron needs bushes or trees to build nests, although it will use rock ledges where vegetation is unavailable (for example, on cliffs).

Unlike the black-crowned night heron, the yellow-crowned does not mind living near humans and can be found in wooded neighborhoods, nesting on rooftops and driveways. Such cohabitation may not go smoothly and can create conflicts with humans.

== Behavior ==
=== Vocalizations ===
The most common call of the yellow-crowned night heron is a loud, sharp and quick squawk that the bird gives shortly after taking off or uses as an alarm call or an aggression call. The young beg for food with a soft chu-chu-chu call that becomes louder as the chicks grow older and more demanding. A different range of vocalizations plays an important part in courtship and pair formation. Males and females use a yup-yup call during the greeting ceremony, and a huh! call when they form a pair among other nesting birds. The male concludes his courtship display with a whoop which may or may not lead to the pair actually forming.

=== Feeding ===
The yellow-crowned night heron eats mainly crustaceans (crabs and crayfish) as well as insects, some fish (eels and pipefish) or worms (leeches and other aquatic worms). Crabs preyed upon include fiddler crabs, marsh crabs, blue crabs (Callinectes sapidus, Callinectes similis and Cardisoma guanhumi) and green crabs. It can also feed on amphibians, molluscs (mussels and snails), lizards, snakes, small rodents and small birds. The geographic location of the heron is closely related to the prey it may find, and the size and shape of its bill allows it to hunt for prey of specific size.

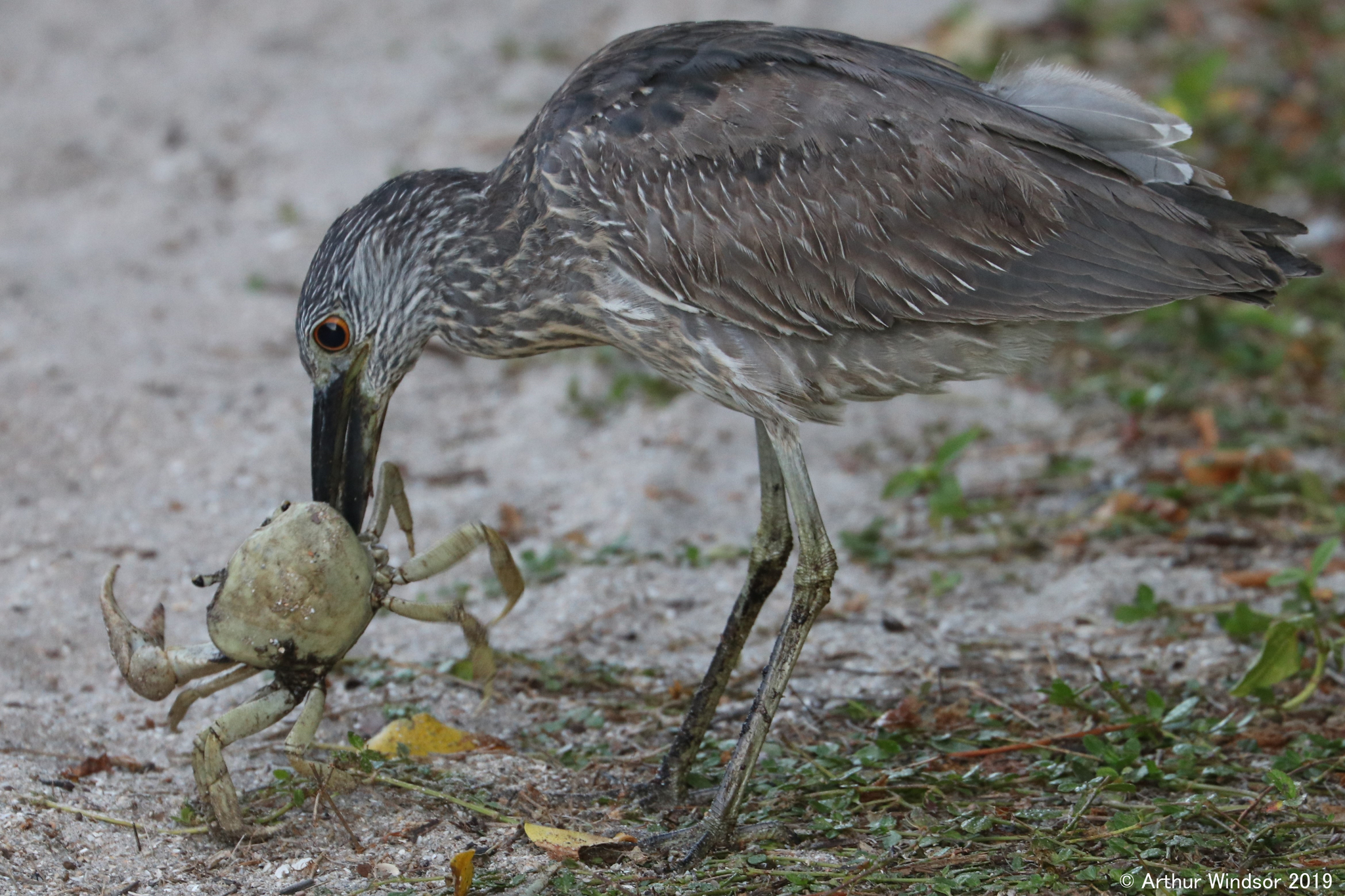
Juvenile eating a blue land crab

The yellow-crowned night heron may forage any time of the day and night, although it prefers the night to feed the young. It becomes very aggressive if another individual approaches when foraging, but will tolerate a safe distance of about ten meters. It selects prey visually, either stalking it or standing and waiting for it to come within reach. When hunting crayfish, the heron stands at the entrance of the burrow, always facing the sun so its shadow is not cast over the entrance of the burrow, which would alert the crawfish. It can also choose an alternate pattern of walking slowly towards prey with its body bent and its head retracted, then standing and waiting before walking slowly again, sneaking up effectively on unsuspecting crabs. Sometimes it can be seen running in shallow water after prey, but it will not follow one in deep water.

Once close enough, it lunges with its bill. Small prey are swallowed whole while larger prey (for example, a large crab), it will try to dismember in order to eat the body first and the legs last, or to jab it straight through the body. It will also carry crabs, molluscs or fish away from the water to prevent them from escaping.

Any indigestible material, such as crab shells, is ejected in a pellet, and it is quite common to find shells and pellets scattered around foraging and nesting areas.

=== Breeding ===
==== Courtship and nest-building ====
Like many other aspects of its life, the yellow-crowned night heron's breeding season depends closely on the emergence of crabs in the spring; the crab cycle itself depends on temperatures. As such, the breeding season of the yellow-crowned night heron varies geographically, typically between March and May. In some tropical locations, it can breed all year.

It is still unclear exactly how, and for how long, the yellow-crowned night heron forms a mating pair. Some herons arrive at breeding grounds already in pairs, meaning they either found a mate during their migration to the breeding grounds, or they have been with this mate for some time. Others form their pair or renew it upon reaching the breeding grounds.

The breeding grounds are chosen near water and host loose, rather small colonies of reproducing herons, unlike those of most wading birds that welcome large colonies. Colonies often start small with only a pair nesting, then grow over the years and can last over 20 years.

About 9–10 days after arriving at the breeding grounds, the pair builds a nest. The male usually chooses an emplacement and starts to build the nest for the female. Eventually, both birds decide where to build their nest, sometimes starting several nests before settling down. At first, the male brings material (twigs, branches and such) for the female to build the nest, then both perform both roles. Sometimes they will steal material from a nearby nest being built. They can be seen repairing their nest well into the breeding season. Trees and bushes are the preferred location for nests, the herons will usually build in high branches away from the trunk. A pair can use the same nest for years, enlarging it every season; the first nest is usually just large enough to hold the eggs. Nest-building is not the result of successful courtship, but rather an active part of the courtship.

==== Hatching and development of the young ====
Nesting yellow-crowned night herons with nestlings

The yellow-crowned night heron typically has one brood per year. It will try to replace a brood completely lost if it is not too late into the breeding season, but not a partially lost brood. The female lays two to six eggs, depending on the conditions, especially the temperature. The eggs are oval and smooth, with a pale green-blue color. Both parents start guarding the nest as soon as the first egg is laid, and they both incubate the clutch in turn.

24–29 days later, the young hatch, vulnerable and entirely dependent on their parents. They look nothing like the adults with their white-grey short, soft feathers, their wide blue eye-ring and their yellow bill.

During the first two weeks, both adults brood the young. After this period, they will only shelter the chicks from sun, rain or strong wind. Both parents feed the young, taking turns gathering food and guarding the nest. They regurgitate food in the center of the nest rather than feeding each chick individually. The young do not recognize their own parents and will adopt their begging-for-food behavior whenever any adult is around them; the adults, on the other hand, recognize their own chicks and are aggressive towards other offspring, driving them away and refusing to feed them.

When the nest grows too tight for the chicks, they start venturing to its edges; they leave the nest 36–42 days after hatching. They cannot fly yet, so they walk around the nests and return daily to the colony to be fed, and they keep doing so for another three weeks. They start taking short flights by the sixth week, and are capable of sustained flight between their seventh and eleventh week. Once again, crab availability intervenes at this point: the more crabs are available to the young, the less often they come back to the roost and the less they rely on adults to be fed.

The immature birds will roost with the adults until the end of the breeding season, after which they disperse to unknown destinations. They will not be seen on the breeding grounds until they have acquired their adult plumage (two or three years later), and little is known about their ecology during this time. This mystery is actually a research priority about the yellow-crowned night heron.

== Human interaction ==
Like many other species of birds, the yellow-crowned night heron is an intermediate host and amplifier of the eastern equine encephalomyelitis (EEE) virus (sleeping sickness). This common virus in the Southeast of the United States is lethal to horses and can be to humans as well. It is transmitted by mosquitoes: an infected mosquito will transmit the virus to a yellow-crowned night heron, which will be unaffected by it but will host it (the heron is known as a "reservoir host" for the virus) until another mosquito picks it up from the heron and transmits it to a horse or a human. Because of the long distances over which yellow-crowned night herons travel during migration, they can carry the virus over larger geographical areas, becoming amplifiers of EEE. However, EEE remains a rare disease of which the symptoms can be treated, and only a few cases are identified most years.

== Threats and conservation ==
=== Threats ===
The yellow-crowned night heron has no real competition for food. The adults have virtually no predators, but the nests are vulnerable to other animals. Both the eggs and the young are an appealing meal to American crows and some mammals such as raccoons. Crows are also known to harass adult yellow-crowned night heron out of their nest, or displace the eggs in order to use the nest themselves. The importance of the impact of such predation varies geographically, Virginia being the state where it matters the most.

Human activities also constitute threats to the yellow-crowned night heron. In areas where the herons cohabit with people, they are often disturbed or shooed away from their nests if they get too close to human habitations. Loss of habitat is another major threat to the yellow-crowned night heron, with the wetlands they favor regressing continually. Additionally, in some part of the Americas such as Louisiana and the Bahamas, the meat of the yellow-crowned night heron is considered a delicacy, leading to illegal hunting of the fledgling.

=== Conservation status and measures ===
The yellow-crowned night heron is generally not considered a threatened species, as the population size is very large, its range is wide and it has a stable trend. Its status with the IUCN is of Least Concern, meaning no conservation action is required across the species' range. However, this status changes in some specific geographic locations, such as Indiana, Illinois, Pennsylvania, and Delaware, where the yellow-crowned night heron is considered state-endangered, Kentucky where it is classified as Threatened, and Virginia, where it is classified as "Very High Conservation Need". As such, some conservation measures are taken locally, but the conservation of the yellow-crowned night heron is usually simply included in broader projects, especially those that aim for wetland conservation.

The yellow-crowned night heron was introduced in the Bermudas in the end of the 1970s as a means of biological control against land crabs, which were considered a pest as were digging holes in the golf courses and the population went out of control after the closely related Bermuda night heron went extinct in the 1600s. As yellow-crowned night herons are opportunistic feeders, not specialist feeders like the Bermuda night heron which have since decimated native land crab populations and have been observed predating endemic and critically endangered Bermuda rock lizards.

== In culture ==
In September 2019, the yellow-crowned night heron was named the official bird of the City of Houston, Texas.

In September 2025, the yellow-crowned night heron was named the official bird of the City of Bayonne, New Jersey.

== Gallery ==
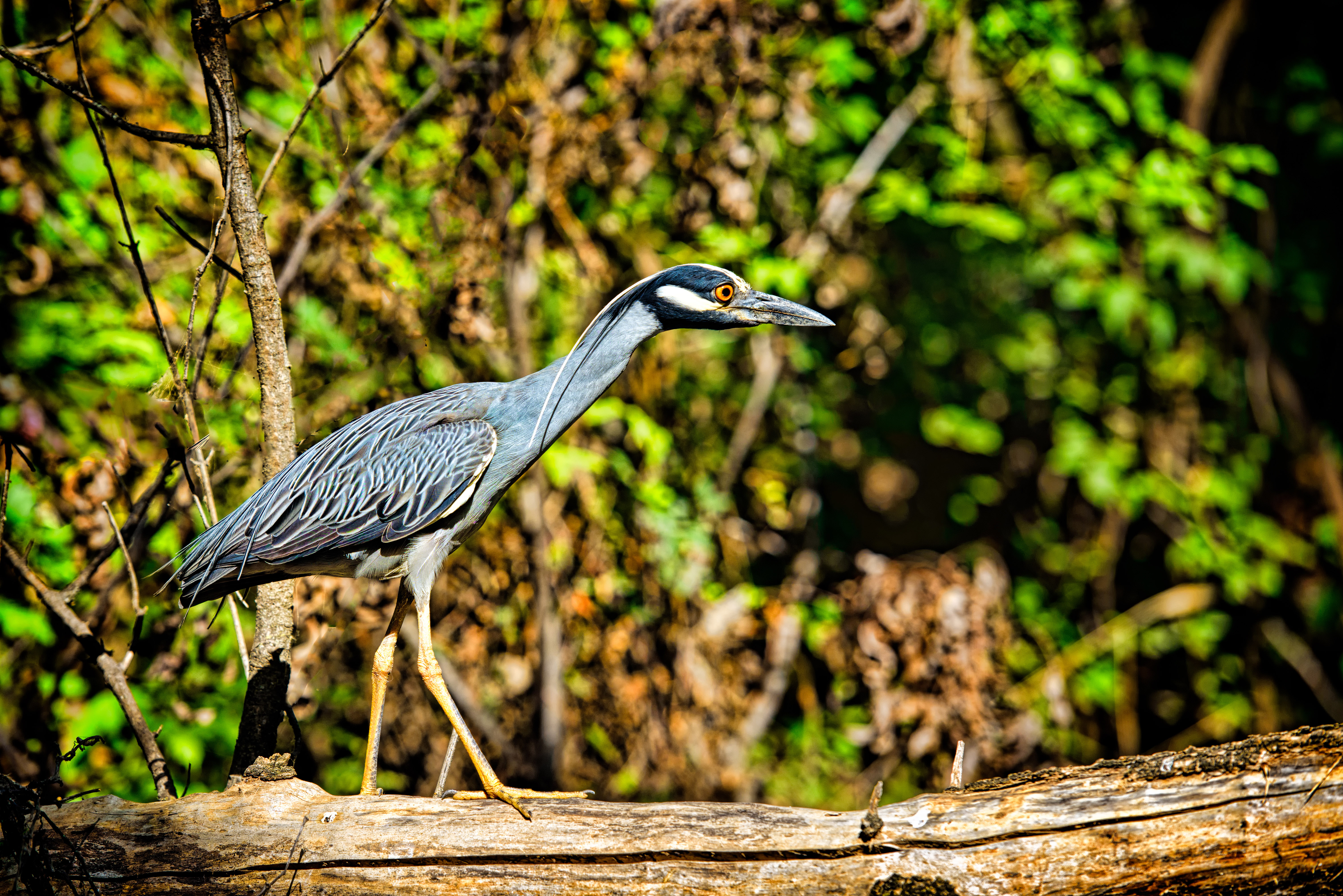
In Austin, Texas

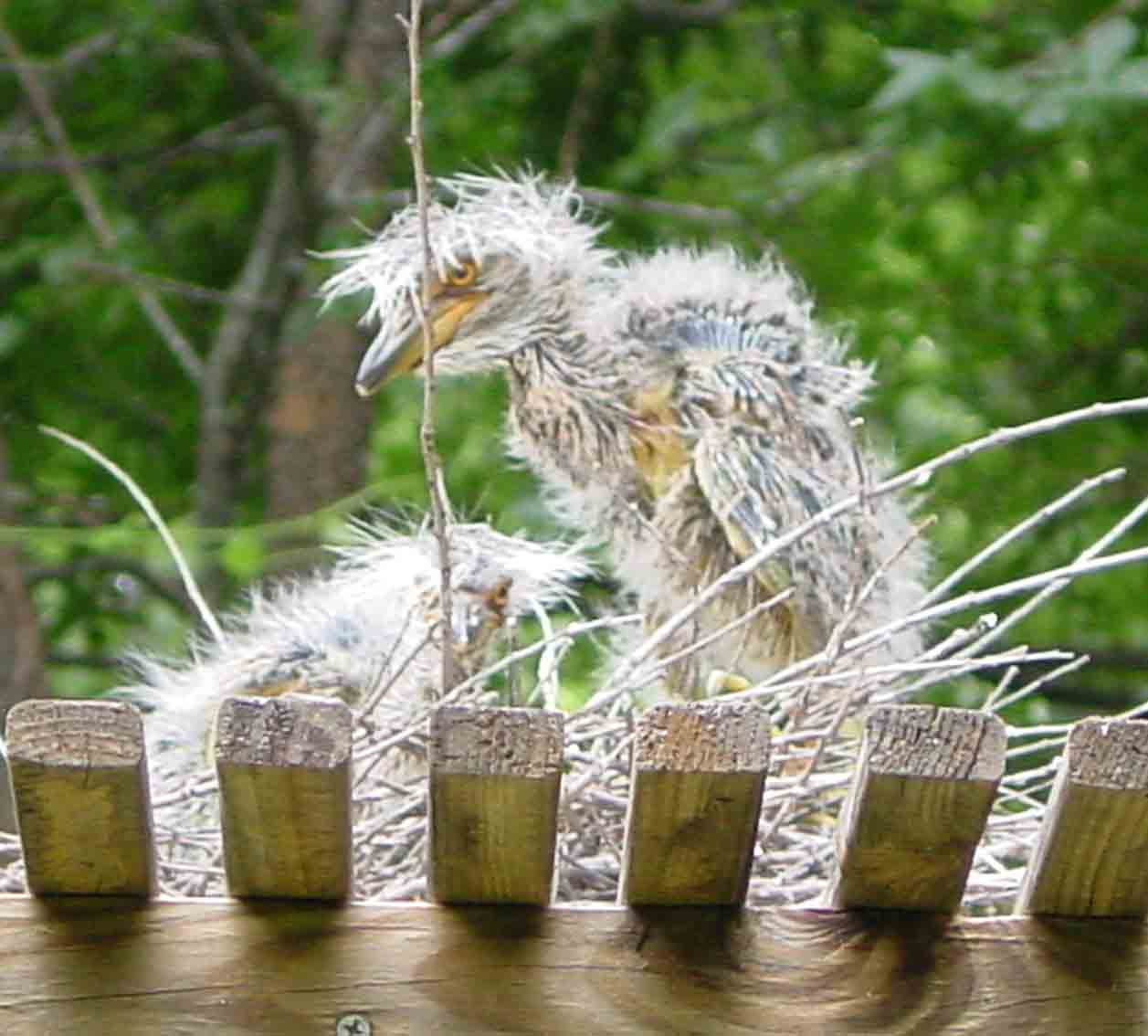
Chicks in Texas

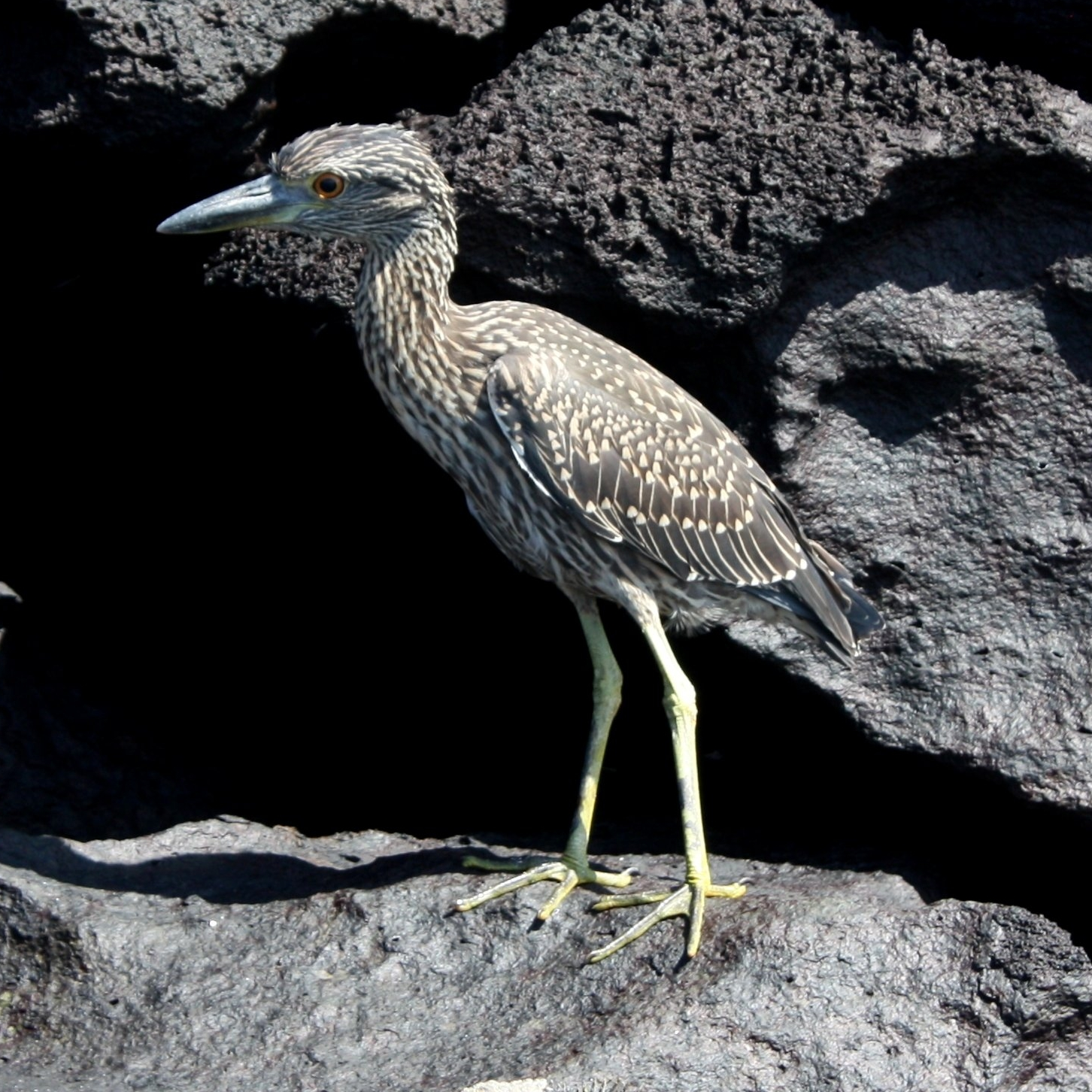
Juvenile in the Galápagos Islands

Juvenile in flight in Brooklyn NY USA

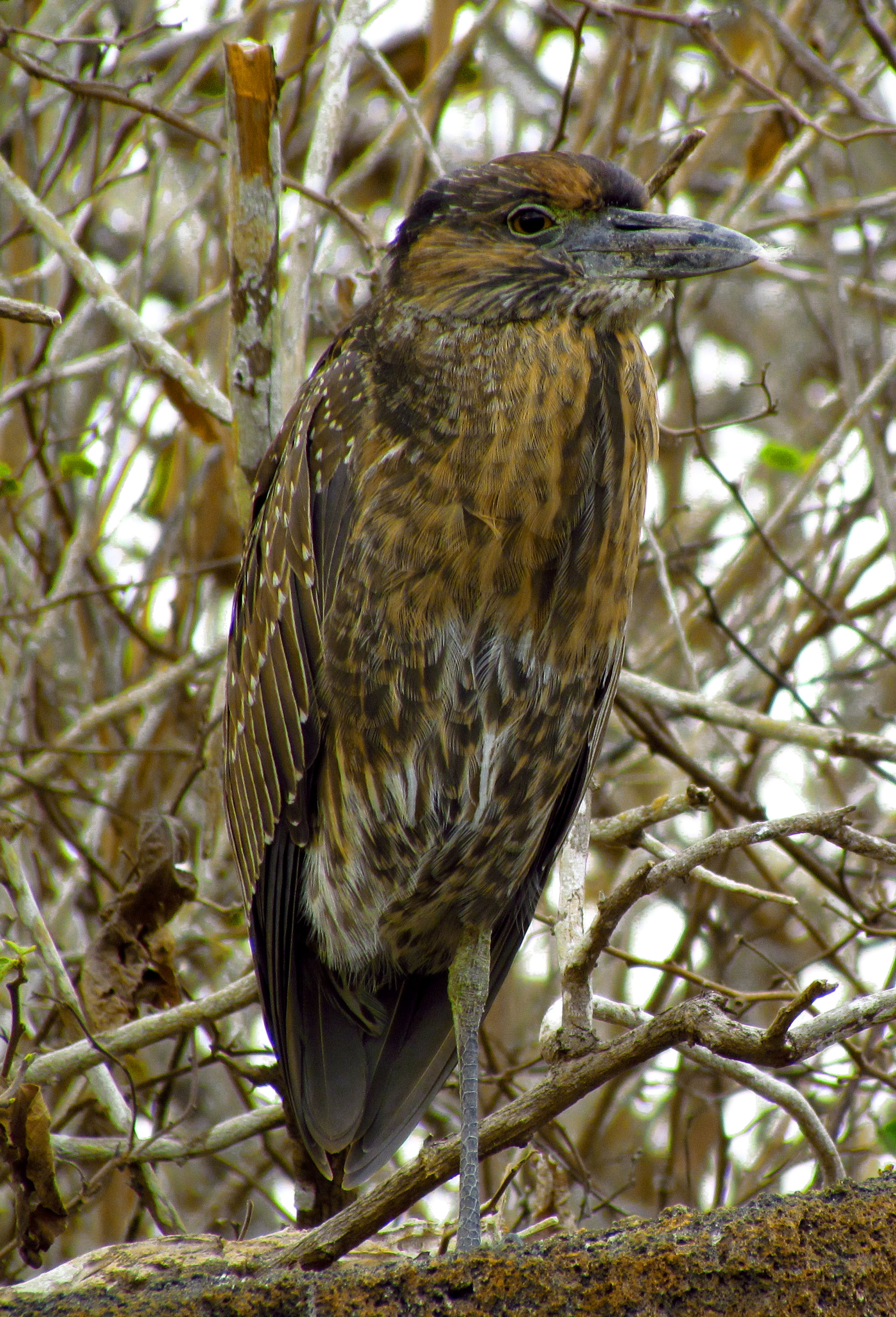
Juvenile, Galápagos Islands

Standing in suburban backyard

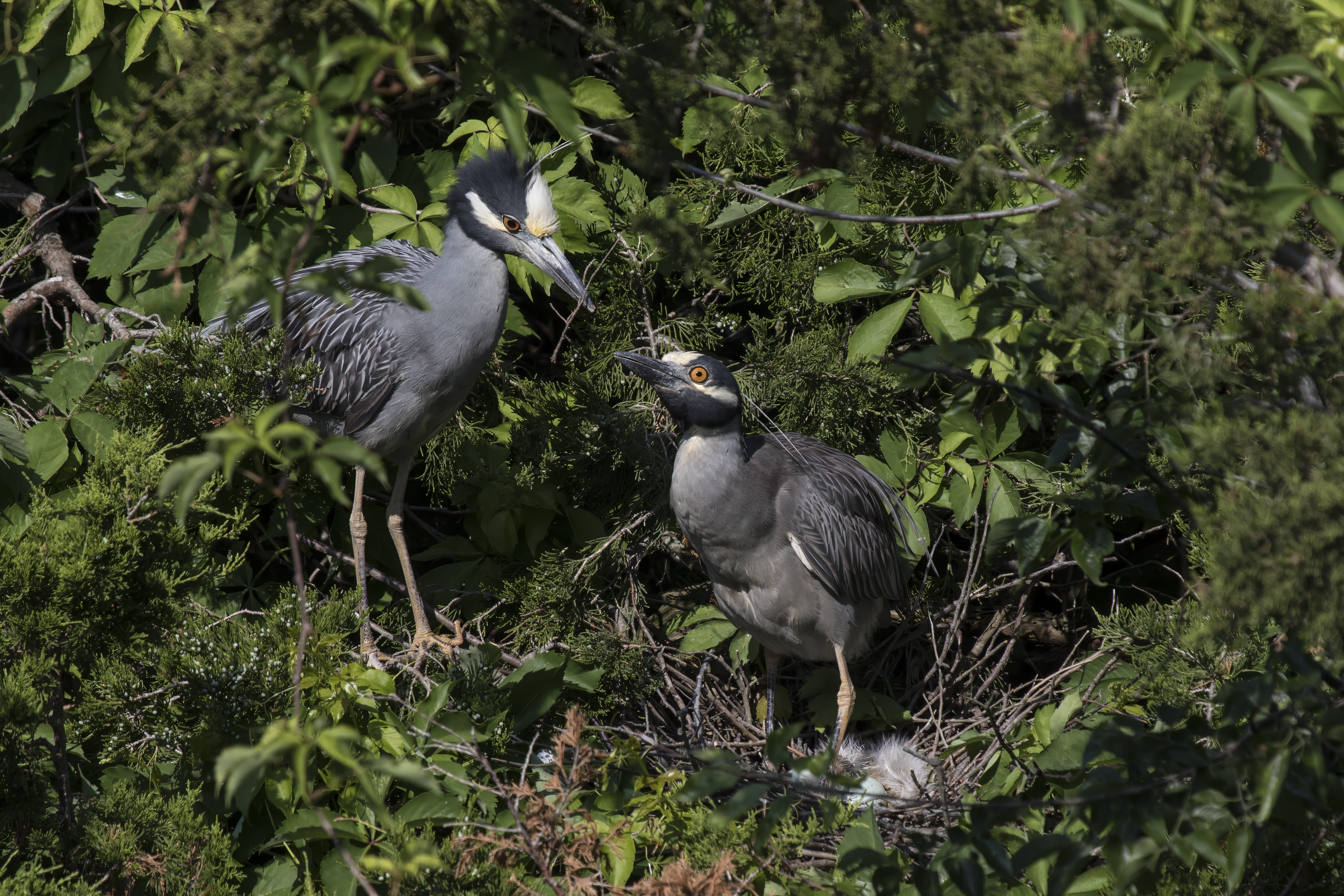
Two adults at a nest with young

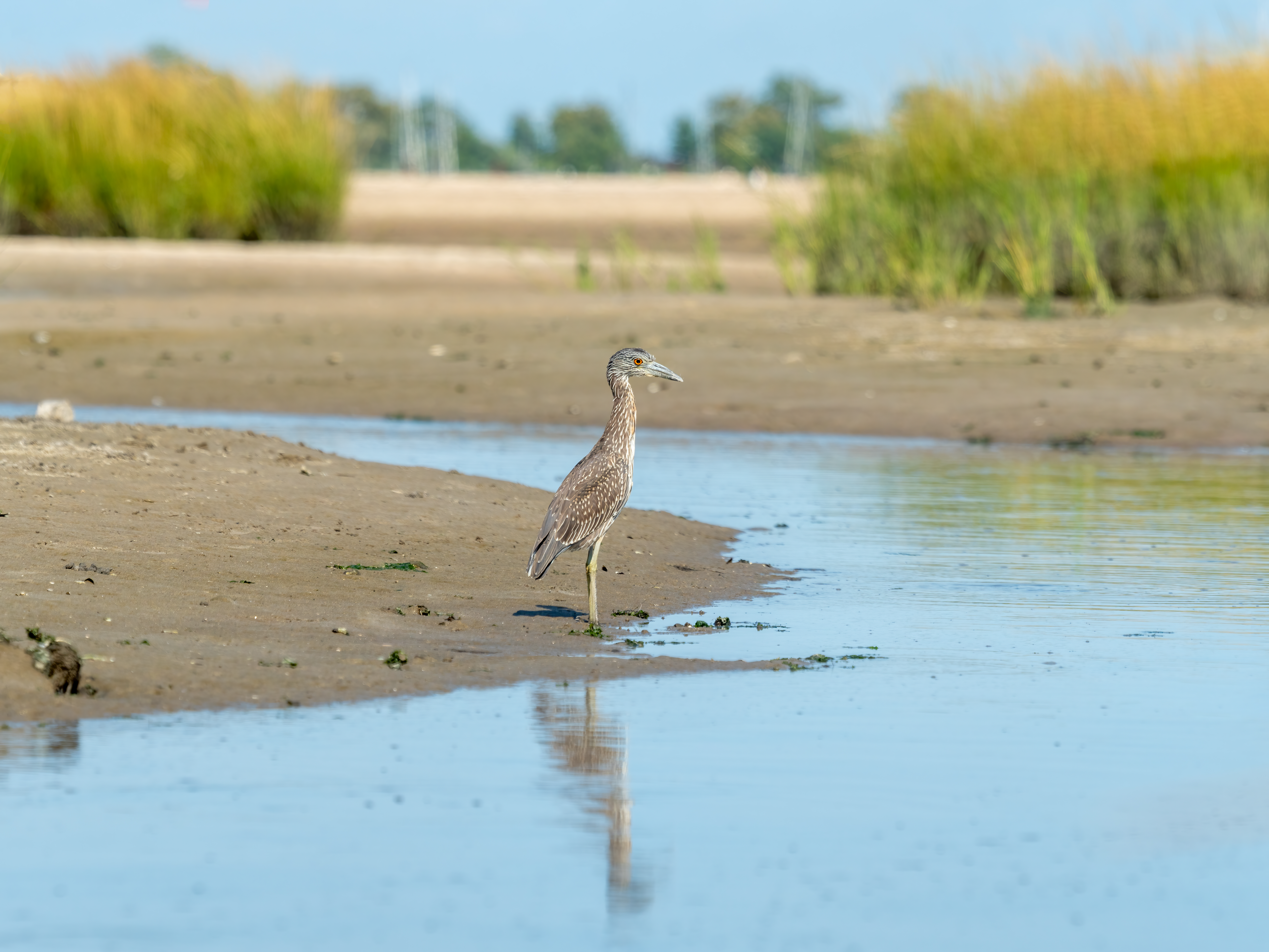
Juvenile in the Plumb Beach saltmarsh

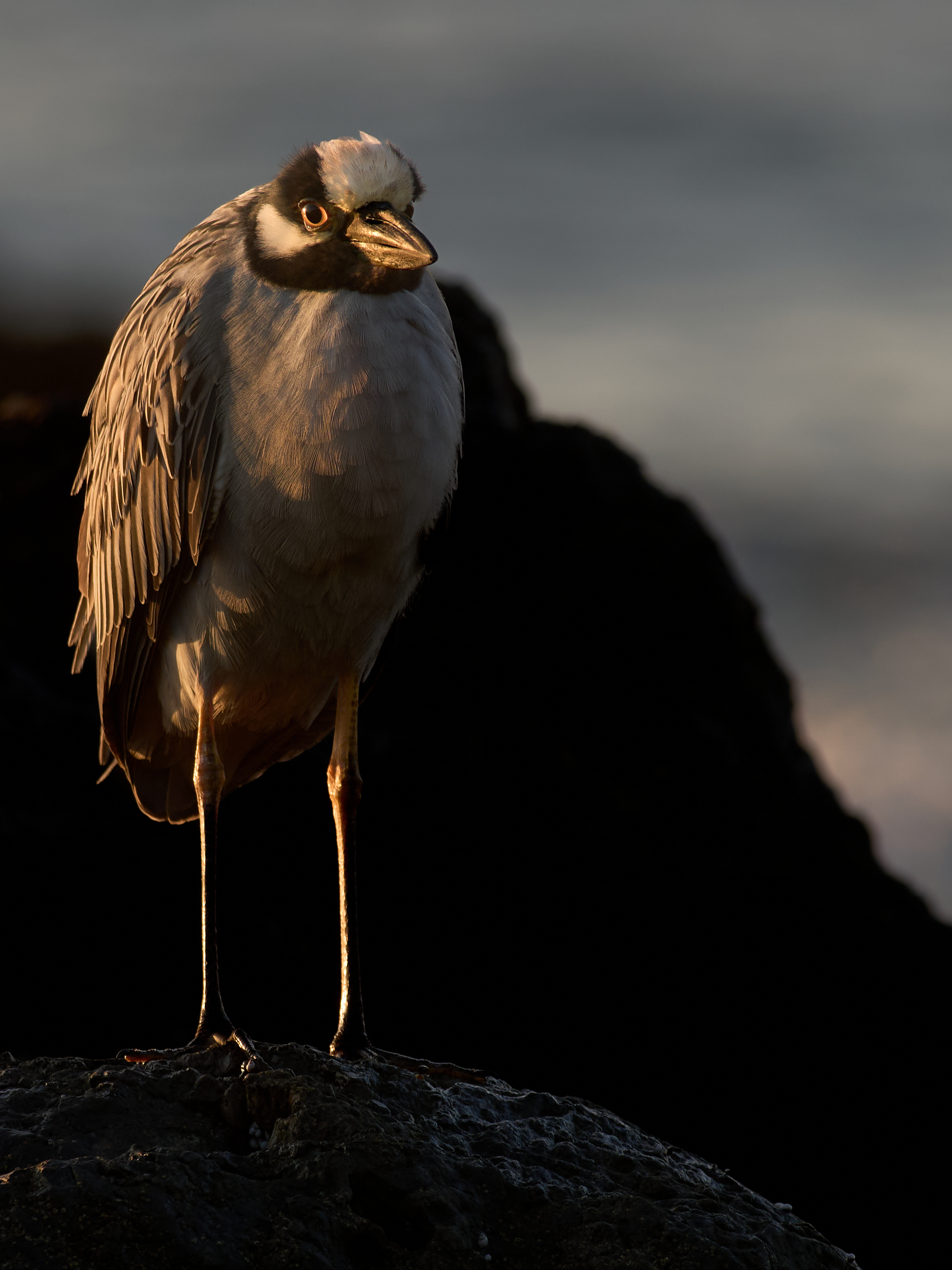
Montezuma, Costa Rica at dawn

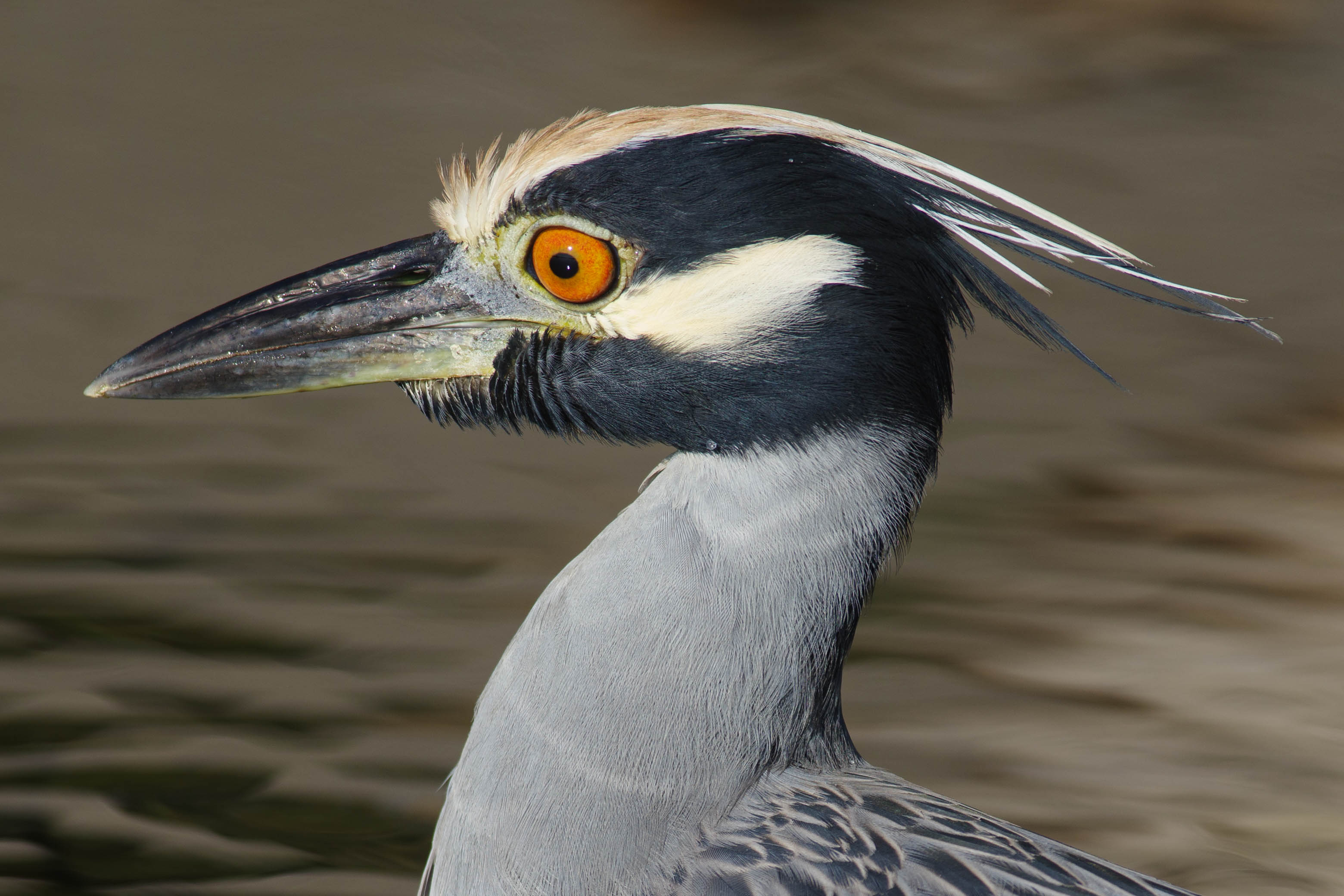
Montezuma, Costa Ricapotrait

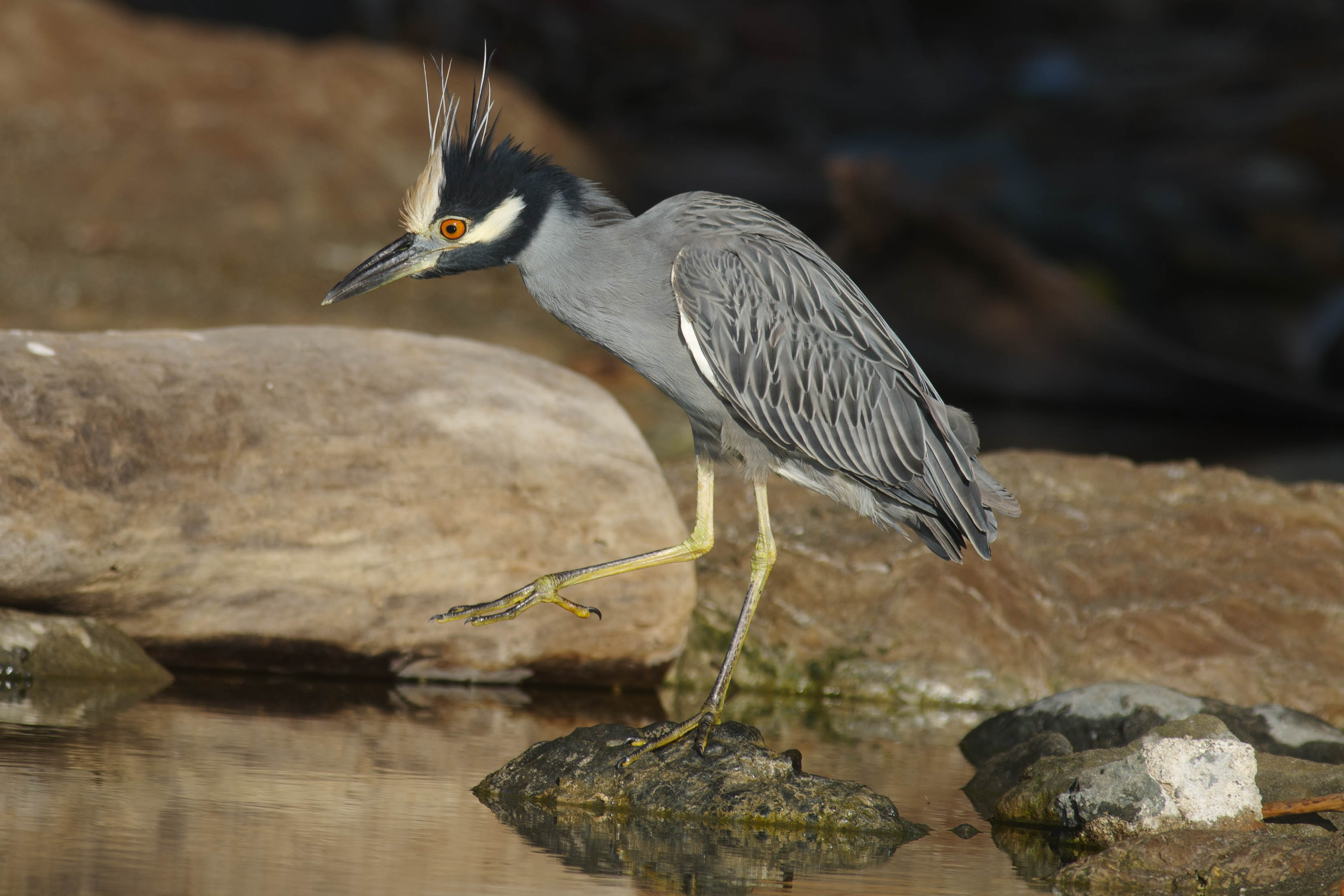
Montezuma, Costa Rica
