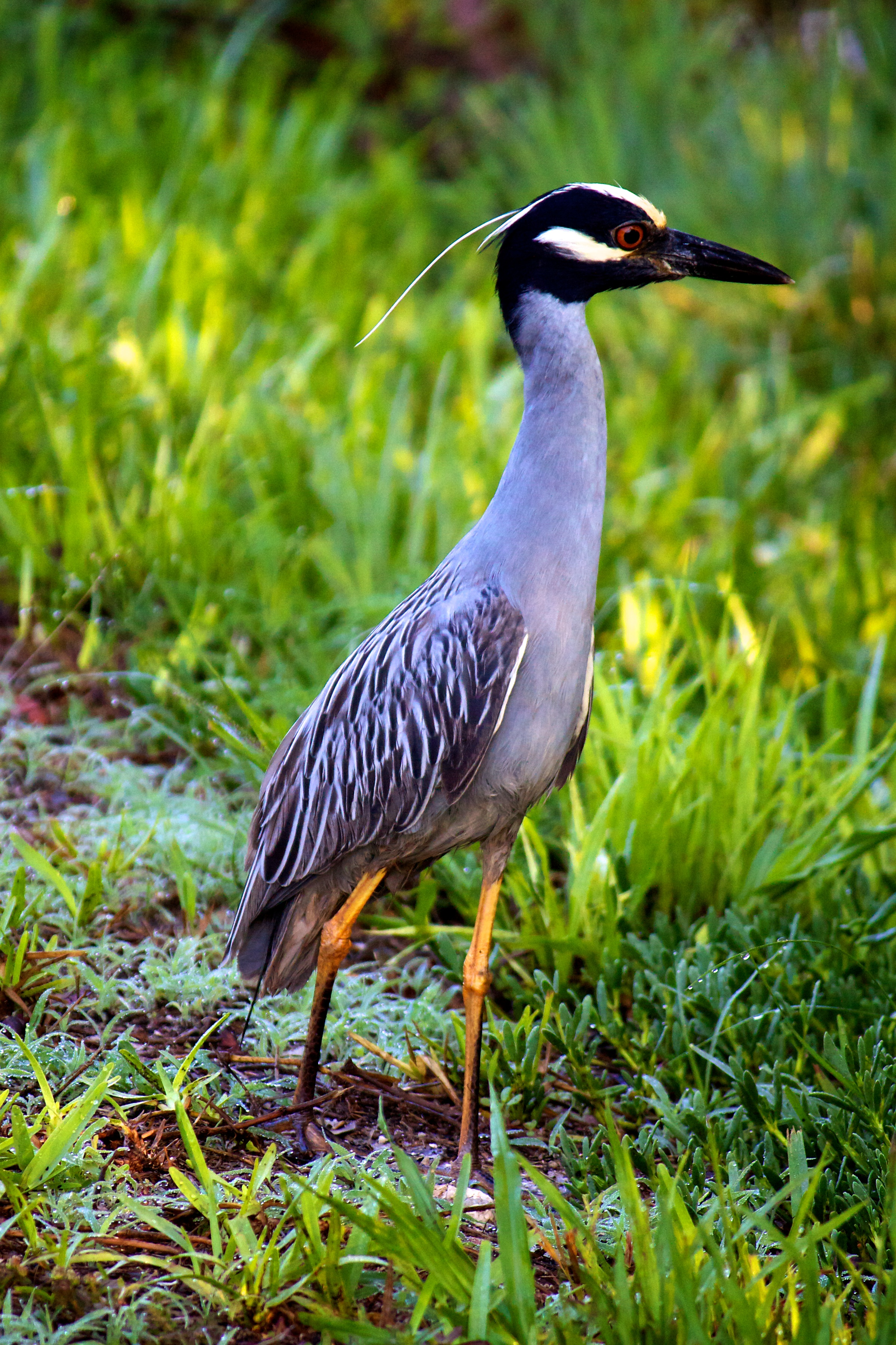
- Yellow-crowned night heron (N. violacea)

Scientific classification
- Kingdom: Animalia
- Phylum: Chordata
- Class: Aves
- Order: Pelecaniformes
- Family: Ardeidae
- Subfamily: Ardeinae
- Genus: Nyctanassa; Stejneger, 1887

Type species
- Ardea violacea Linnaeus, 1758

Species
- N. violacea †N. carcinocatactes

= Nyctanassa =

Genus of birds

Nyctanassa is a genus of night herons from the Americas, especially (but not exclusively) warmer coastal regions. They were formerly included in the genus Nycticorax, but today all major authorities recognize them as distinct.

== Taxonomy ==
The genus Nyctanassa was introduced in 1887 by the Norwegian born zoologist Leonhard Stejneger to accommodate a single species, the yellow-crowned night heron, which is therefore the type species.

== Etymology ==
The genus name Nyctanassa combines the Ancient Greek: νύξ : núx, genitive νυκτός : nuktós meaning "night" with άνασσα : ánassa meaning "queen" or "lady".

== Species ==
The genus contains the following two species, of which only one is still extant:

Image	Scientific name	Common name	Distribution
	Nyctanassa violacea	Yellow-crowned night heron	United States (South Florida, Gulf Coast, and eastern Texas), Mexico, Central America, Galápagos, the Caribbean and northern South America (south to Peru and Brazil)
	Nyctanassa carcinocatactes	Bermuda night heron	Bermuda; extinct
